= List of People's Artists of the USSR =

This is a list of People's Artists of the USSR, an honorary title granted to artists of the Soviet Union between 1936 and 1991. The list covers both the award for performance arts (Russian: Народный артист СССР, romanized: Narodny artist SSSR) and a separate award for visual arts (Народный художник, Narodny khudozhnik).

The list is sorted in chronological order.

== Performing arts (Narodny artist) ==
During this time, 1006 people were given this honor.

=== 1936 ===
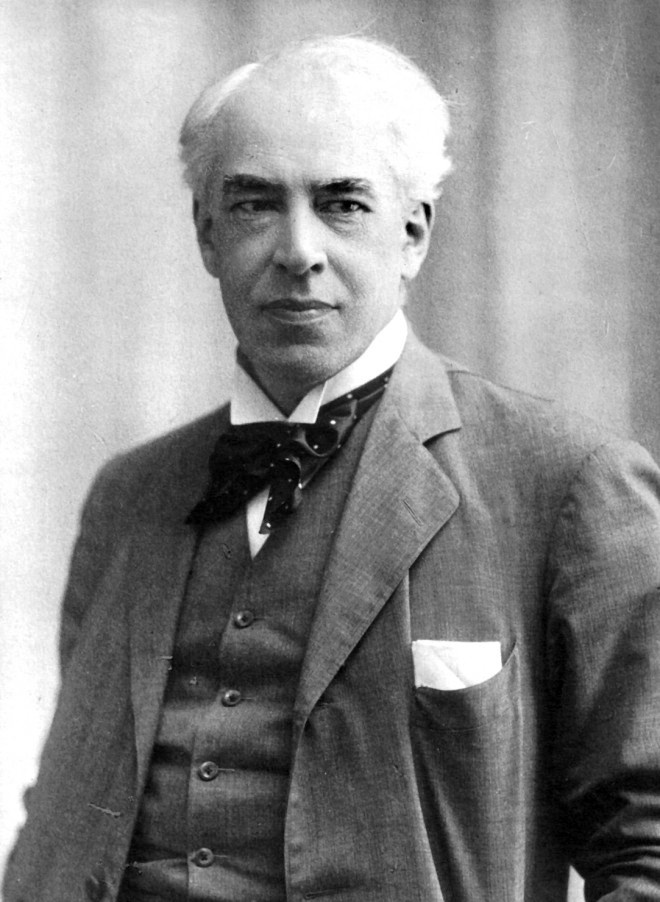
Konstantin Stanislavski, the first People's Artist of the USSR

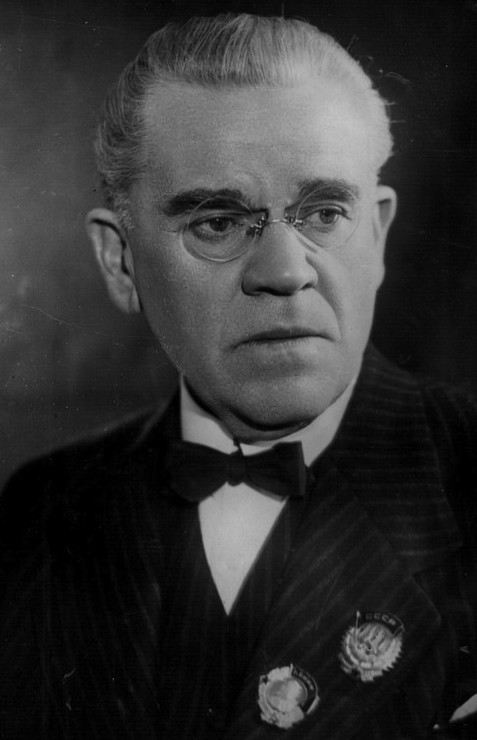
Ivan Moskvin

- Konstantin Stanislavski (1863–1938), theatre practitioner
- Vladimir Nemirovich-Danchenko (1858–1943), theatre director, writer and playwright
- Vasily Kachalov (1875–1948), actor of screen and stage
- Ivan Moskvin (1874–1946), actor of screen and stage
- Ekaterina Korchagina-Alexandrovskaya (1874–1951), theater actress
- Maria Blumenthal-Tamarina (1859–1938), movie and theatre actress
- Antonina Nezhdanova (1873–1950), opera singer (lyric coloratura soprano)
- Boris Shchukin (1894–1939), movie and theatre actor
- Maria Litvinenko-Volgemut (1892–1966), opera singer (lyric dramatic soprano)
- Panas Saksagansky (1859–1940), actor, theater director, playwright
- Akaki Vasadze (1899–1978), actor, theater and teacher
- Akaki Khorava (1895–1972), movie and theatre actor
- Kulyash Baiseitova (1912–1957) (bypassing the title of People's Artist of the RSFSR), opera singer (lyric coloratura soprano)
- Leonid Leonidov (1873–1941), actor and stage director

=== 1937 ===
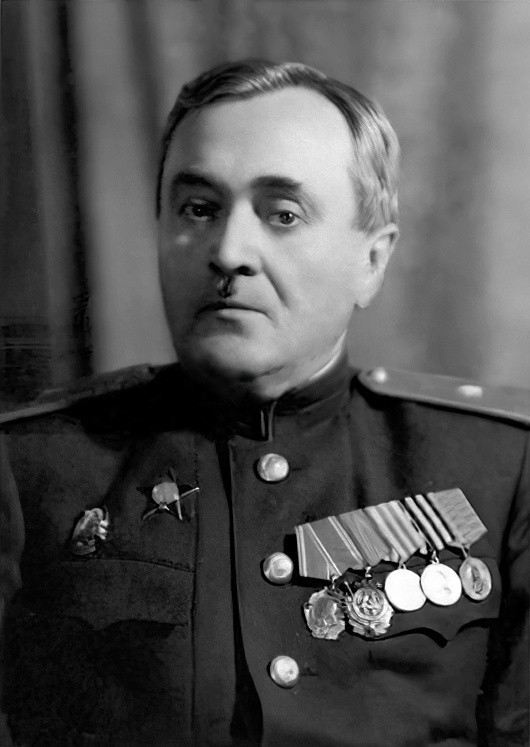
Alexander Vasilyevich Alexandrov

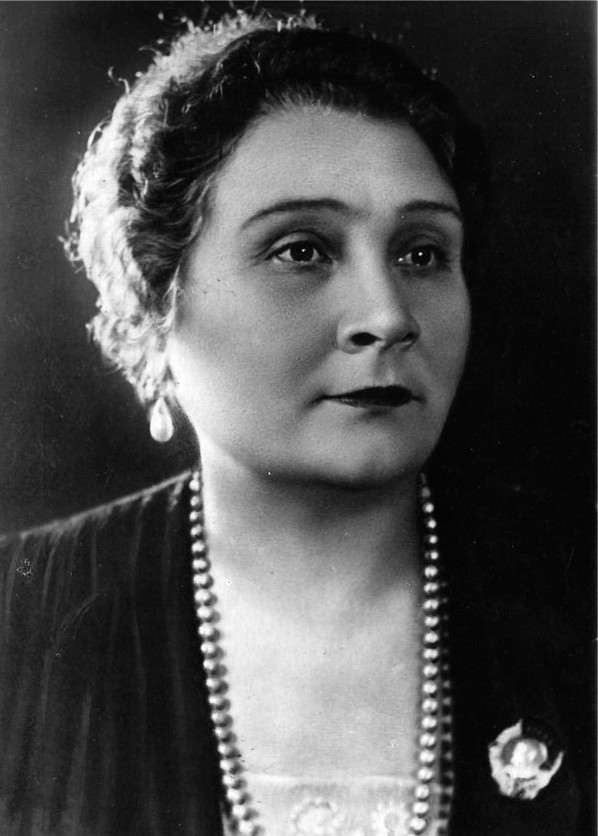
Nadezhda Obukhova

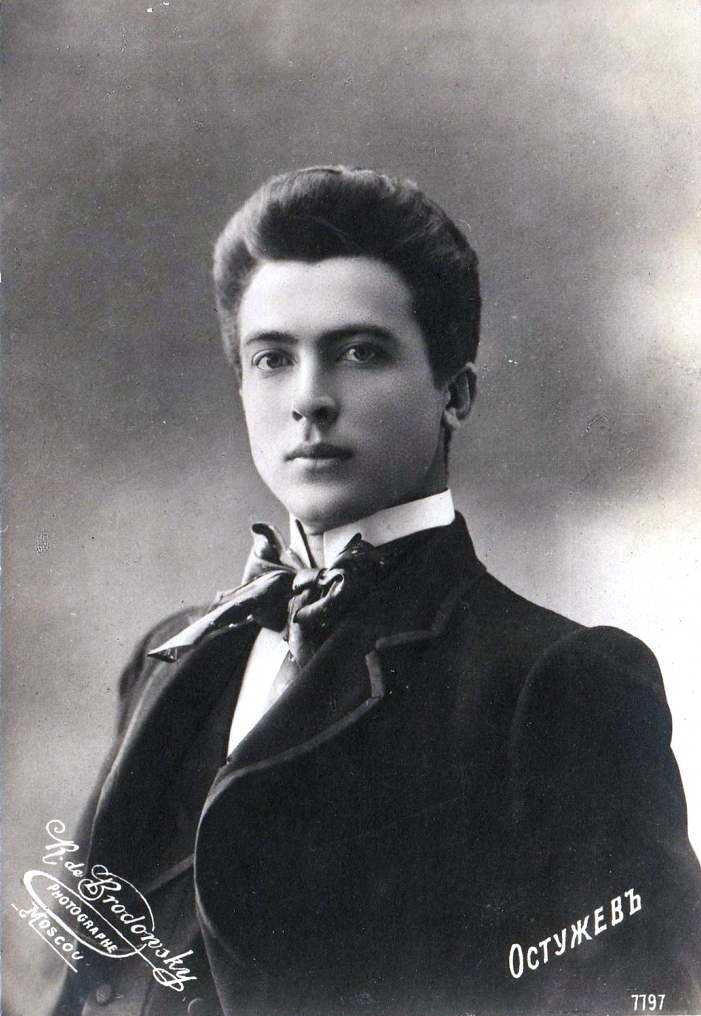
Alexander Ostuzhev

- Alexander Vasilyevich Alexandrov (1883–1946) (bypassing the title of People's Artist of the RSFSR), composer and conductor, founder of the Alexandrov Ensemble
- Alla Tarasova (1898–1973) (bypassing the title of People's Artist of the RSFSR), movie and theatre actress
- Nikolai Khmelyov (1901–1945), stage actor
- Mikhail Tarkhanov (1877–1948), movie and theatre actor
- Halima Nosirova (1913—2003), singer (soprano)
- Valeria Barsova (1892–1967), opera singer (lyric coloratura soprano)
- Ksenia Derzhinskaya (1889–1951), opera singer (dramatic soprano)
- Nadezhda Obukhova (1886–1961), singer (mezzo soprano)
- Alexander Pirogov (1899–1964) (bypassing the title of People's Artist of the RSFSR), opera singer (bass)
- Mark Reizen (1895–1992) (bypassing the title of People's Artist of the RSFSR), opera singer (bass)
- Samuil Samosud (1884–1964), conductor
- Elena Stepanova (1891–1978), opera singer (lyric coloratura soprano)
- Lev Steinberg (1870–1945), conductor and composer
- Boris Dobronravov (1896–1949) (bypassing the title of People's Artist of the RSFSR), stage and film actor
- Mikhail Klimov (1880–1942), stage and film actor
- Olga Knipper (1868–1959), theater actress
- Alexander Ostuzhev (1874–1953), theater actor
- Vera Pashennaya (1887–1962), theater and film actress
- Varvara Ryzhova (1871–1963), actress of theater and cinema
- Prov Sadovsky, jr. (1874–1947), theater actor and director
- Aleksandra Yablochkina (1866–1964), theater actress

=== 1938 ===
- Ivan Yershov (1867–1943), opera singer (dramatic tenor)
- Bulbul (1897–1961), singer (lyric dramatic tenor)
- Uzeyir Hajibeyov (1885–1948), composer, conductor, publicist, playwright
- Reinhold Glière (1875–1956), composer and conductor
- Shovkat Mammadova (1897–1981), singer (lyric coloratura soprano)

=== 1939 ===
- Yuri Yuriev (1872–1948), stage actor
- Pavel Zakharovich Andreev (1874–1950), opera singer (bass baritone), soloist of the Kirov Theatre
- Vera Michurina-Samoilova (1866–1948), actress of the Alexandrinsky Theatre
- Solomon Mikhoels (1890–1948), actor and the artistic director of the Moscow State Jewish Theater
- Abdylas Maldybaev (1906–1978) (bypassing the title of People's Artist of the Kirghiz SSR), composer, operatic tenor singer, soloist of the Kyrgyz Opera and Ballet Theater
- Haykanoush Danielyan (1893–1958) (bypassing the title of People's Artist of the Armenian SSR), singer (lyric coloratura soprano), soloist of the Yerevan Opera Theatre

=== 1940 ===
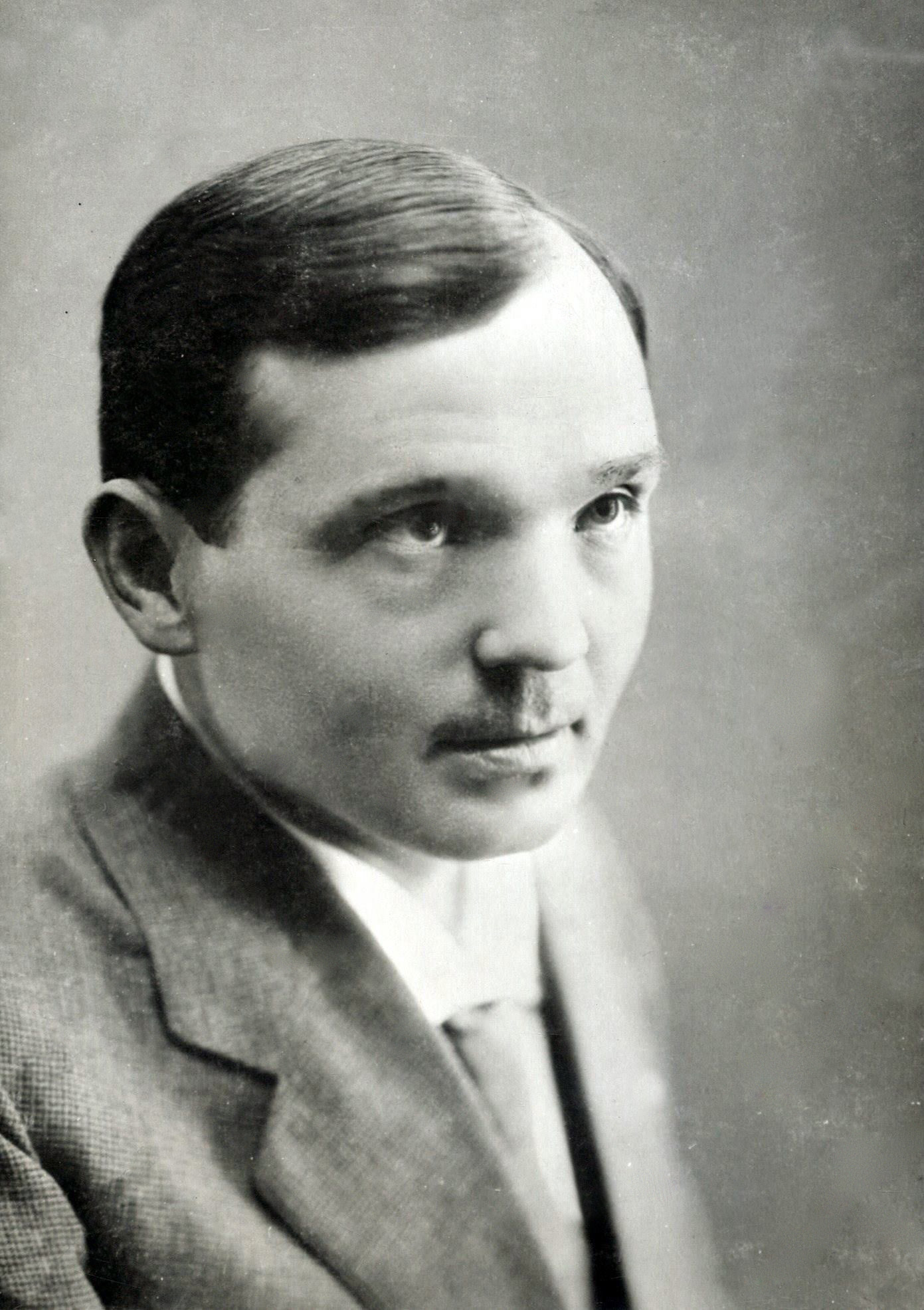
Hnat Yura

- Hnat Yura (1888–1966), director, actor of theatre and film, founder of the Ivan Franko National Academic Drama Theater
- Ariy Pazovsky (1887–1953), conductor, chief conductor of the Kirov Theater
- Larisa Alexandrovskaya (1904–1980), opera singer (soprano), soloist of the National Opera and Ballet of Belarus
- Ivan Kozlovsky (1900–1993) (bypassing the title of People's Artist of the RSFSR), opera singer (lyric tenor), soloist of the Bolshoi Theatre
- Maxim Mikhailov (1893–1971) (bypassing the title of People's Artist of the RSFSR), opera singer (bass), soloist of the Bolshoi Theatre
- Gombozhap Tsydynzhapov (1905–1980), actor, stage director, playwright, art director of the Buryat Drama Theater

=== 1941 ===
- Muhammedjan Kasymov (1907–1971) (bypassing the title of People's Artist of the Tajik SSR), film and theater actor

=== 1943 ===
- Evdokia Turchaninova (1870–1963), actress of the Maly Theatre

=== 1944 ===
- Amvrosy Buchma (1891–1957), theater and movie actor, chies director of the Ivan Franko National Academic Drama Theater
- Vasily Vasilko (1893–1972), theater actor, director, art director of the Odessa Academic Ukrainian Music and Drama Theater
- Zoia Gaidai (1902–1965), opera soprano, soloist of the National Opera of Ukraine
- Andrey Alekseevich Ivanov (1900–1970), opera singer, soloist of the National Opera of Ukraine
- Alexander Kramov (1885–1951), theater actor and director, artistic director of the Kharkov Academic Russian Drama Theater
- Maryan Krushelnitsky (1897–1963), theater actor and director, movie actor, artistic director of the Kharkiv Ukrainian Drama Theatre
- Ivan Maryanenko (1878–1962), theater actor
- Ivan Patorzhinsky (1896–1960), opera singer (bass)
- Levko Revutsky (1889–1977), composer
- Boris Romanitsky (1891–1988), actor, theater director
- Nikolai Smolich (1888–1968), theater director
- Natalia Uzhviy (1898–1986), theater and movie actress
- Konstantin Khokhlov (1885–1956), actor and theater director
- Yuri Shumsky (1887–1954), actor and theater director
- Vladimir Grigoryevich Zakharov (1901–1956), composer
- Nikolai Yakovlev (1869–1950), theater director

=== 1945 ===
- Abrar Khidoyatov (1900–1958), actor of the Uzbek National Academic Drama Theater

=== 1946 ===
- Ruben Simonov (1899–1968), actor and director
- Boris Asafyev (1884–1949), composer and musicologist
- Aleksandr Goldenweiser (1875–1961), pianist, teacher and composer
- Konstantin Igumnov (1873–1948), pianist
- Nikolai Myaskovsky (1881–1950), composer

=== 1947 ===
- Nikolay Cherkasov (1903–1966), theater and movie actor
- Vladimir Gardin (1877–1965), film director, screenwriter and actor (for 70th birthday)

=== 1948 ===
- Grigori Aleksandrov (1903–1983), film director
- Ivan Bersenev (1889–1951), theater actor and director, movie actor
- Sergei Vasilyev (1900–1959), film director
- Gleb Glebov (1899–1967), theater and movie actor
- Nikolai Golovanov (1891–1953), conductor, pianist and composer
- Borisas Dauguvietis (1885–1949), theater actor, director and playwright
- Yuri Zavadsky (1894–1977), theater actor and director
- Mikhail Kedrov (1894–1972), theater actor and director, movie actor
- Ants Lauter (1894–1973), theater actor and director, movie actor
- Nikolay Okhlopkov (1900–1967), theater and movie actor and director
- Aleksey Dmitrievich Popov (1892–1961), theater director and pedagogyst
- Vsevolod Pudovkin (1893–1953), film director
- Ivan Pyryev (1901–1968), film director
- Natan Rakhlin (1906–1979), conductor and pedagogyst
- Eduards Smiļģis (1886–1966), theater actor and director
- Mikheil Chiaureli (1894–1974), movie director
- Fridrikh Ermler (1898–1967), movie director
- Olga Androvskaya (1898–1975), theater and film actress
- Alexey Gribov (1902–1977), theater and film actor
- Klavdiya Yelanskaya (1898–1972), theater actress
- Vladimir Yershov (1896–1964), theater and movie actor
- Boris Livanov (1904–1972), theater and movie actor
- Viktor Stanitsyn (1897–1976), theater actor and director, movie actor
- Vasili Toporkov (1889–1970), theater and movie actor, theatre pedagogyst
- Faina Shevchenko (1893–1971), theater actress
- Sergei Gerasimov (1906–1985), film director and actor, screenwriter, pedagogyst
- Pavel Molchanov (1902–1977), theatre actor
- Barys Platonaw (1903–1967), theater and movie actor

=== 1949 ===
- Vasili Vanin (1898–1951), theater actor and director, movie actor
- Vera Maretskaya (1906–1978), theater and movie actress
- Nikolay Mordvinov (1901–1966), theater and movie actor
- Mirzaagha Aliyev (1883–1954), theater and movie actor
- Marziyya Davudova (1901–1962), theater and movie actress
- Sidgi Ruhulla (1886–1959), theater and movie actor
- Yelena Gogoleva (1900–1993), theater and movie actress
- Aleksei Dikiy (1889–1955), theater actor and director, movie actor
- Mikhail Zharov (1900–1981), theater and movie actor
- Aleksandr Zrazhevsky (1886–1950), theater and movie actor
- Konstantin Zubov (1888–1956), actor and director, pedagogyst
- Igor Ilyinsky (1901–1987), theater and movie actor, director
- Mikhail Tsaryov (1903–1987), theater and movie actor and director, pedagogyst
- Aman Kul'mamedov (1908–1977), theater and movie actor

=== 1950 ===
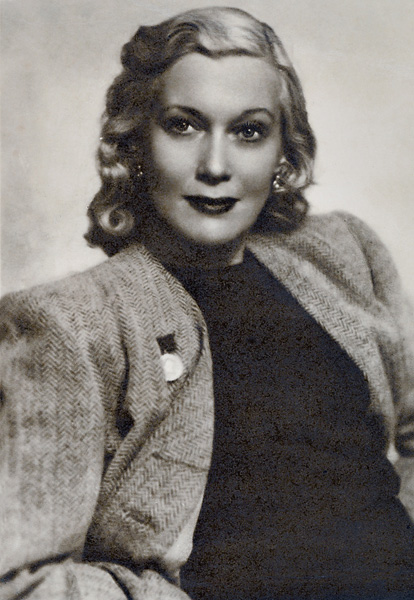
Lyubov Orlova

- Mikheil Gelovani (1893–1956), theater and movie actor
- Marina Ladynina (1908–2003), theater and movie actress
- Tamara Makarova (1907–1997), movie actress
- Lyubov Orlova (1902–1975), theater and movie actress
- Vladimir Petrov (1896–1966), film director
- Mikhail Romm (1901–1971), film director
- Nikolay Simonov (1901–1973), film and stage actor
- Boris Chirkov (1901–1982), film and stage actor
- Sergei Lemeshev (1902–1977), opera singer (lyric tenor)
- Kipras Petrauskas (1885–1968), opera singer (lyric dramatic tenor), pedagogyst
- Mykhaĭlo Hryshko (1901–1973), opera singer (dramatic baritone)
- Petr Amiranashvili (1907–1976), opera singer (baritone)
- David Andguladze (1895–1973), opera singer (dramatic tenor)
- Veriko Anjaparidze (1900–1987), theater and movie actress
- Aleksandr Inashvili (1887–1958), opera singer (baritone)
- Vakhtang Chabukiani (1910–1992), ballet dancer

=== 1951 ===
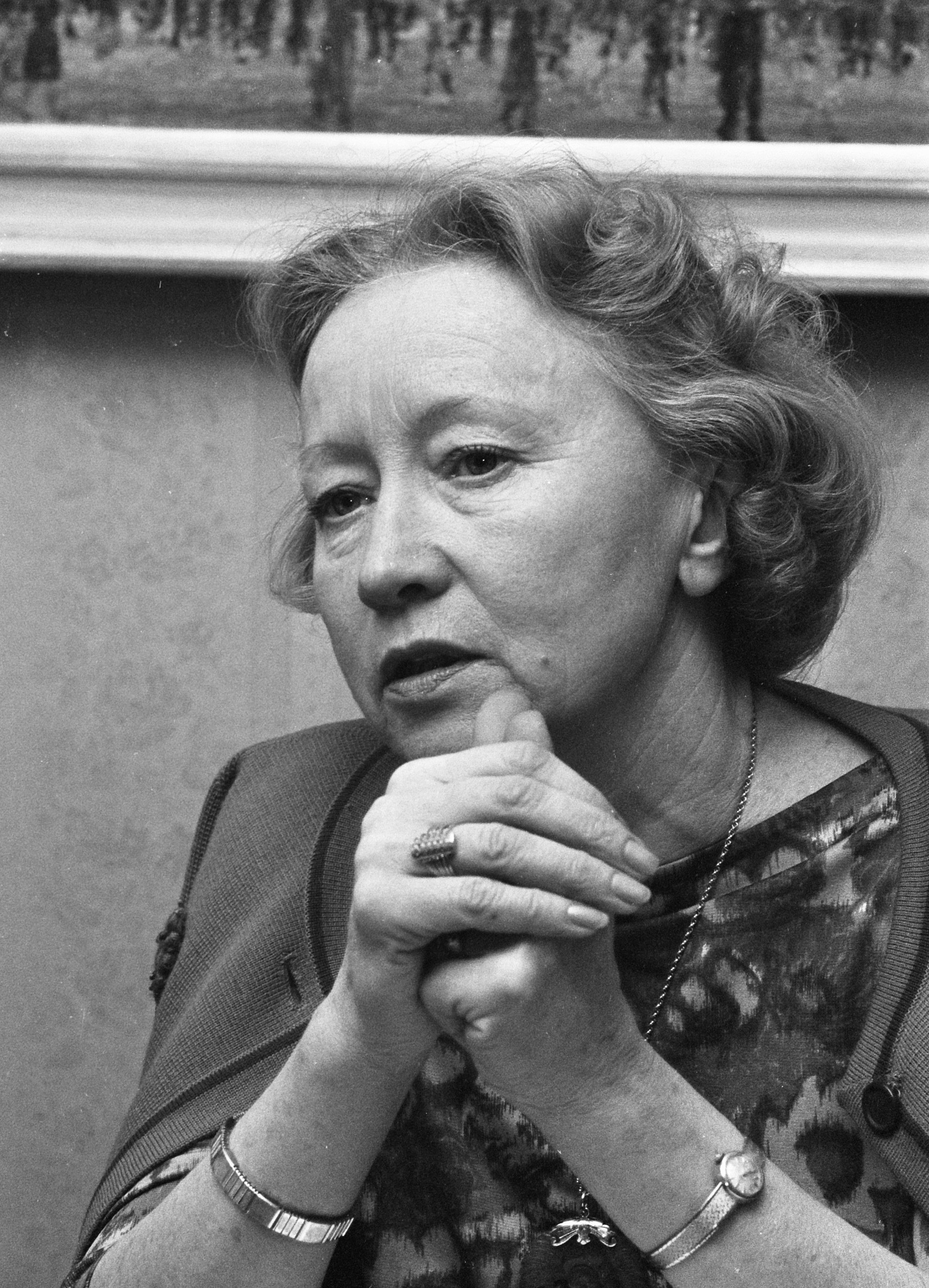
Galina Ulanova

- Aleksandr Borisov (1905–1982), theater and movie actor
- Alexey Petrovich Ivanov (1904–1982), opera singer (baritone)
- Olga Lepeshinskaya (1916–2008), ballet dancer
- Alexander Melik-Pashayev (1905–1964), conductor
- Georgii Nelepp (1904–1957), opera singer (dramatic tenor)
- Galina Ulanova (1910–1998), ballet dancer
- Yuri Fayer (1890–1971), conductor
- Nikandr Khanayev (1890–1974), opera singer (dramatic tenor)
- Boris Gmyrya (1903–1969) (bypassing the title of People's Artist of the Ukrainian SSR), opera singer (bass)
- Mikhail Fedorovich Romanov (1896–1963), theater actor and director, movie actor
- Aleksandr Serdyuk (1900–1988), theater and movie actor
- Mukhtar Ashrafi (1912–1975), composer and conductor
- Sara Ishanturaeva (1911–1998), theater actress

=== 1952 ===
- Sergei Bondarchuk (1920–1994) (bypassing the title of People's Artist of the RSFSR), movie director and actor
- Yelizaveta Chavdar (1925–1989) (bypassing all titles), opera singer (coloratura soprano)

=== 1953 ===
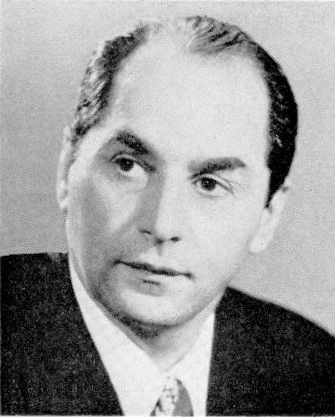
Igor Moiseyev

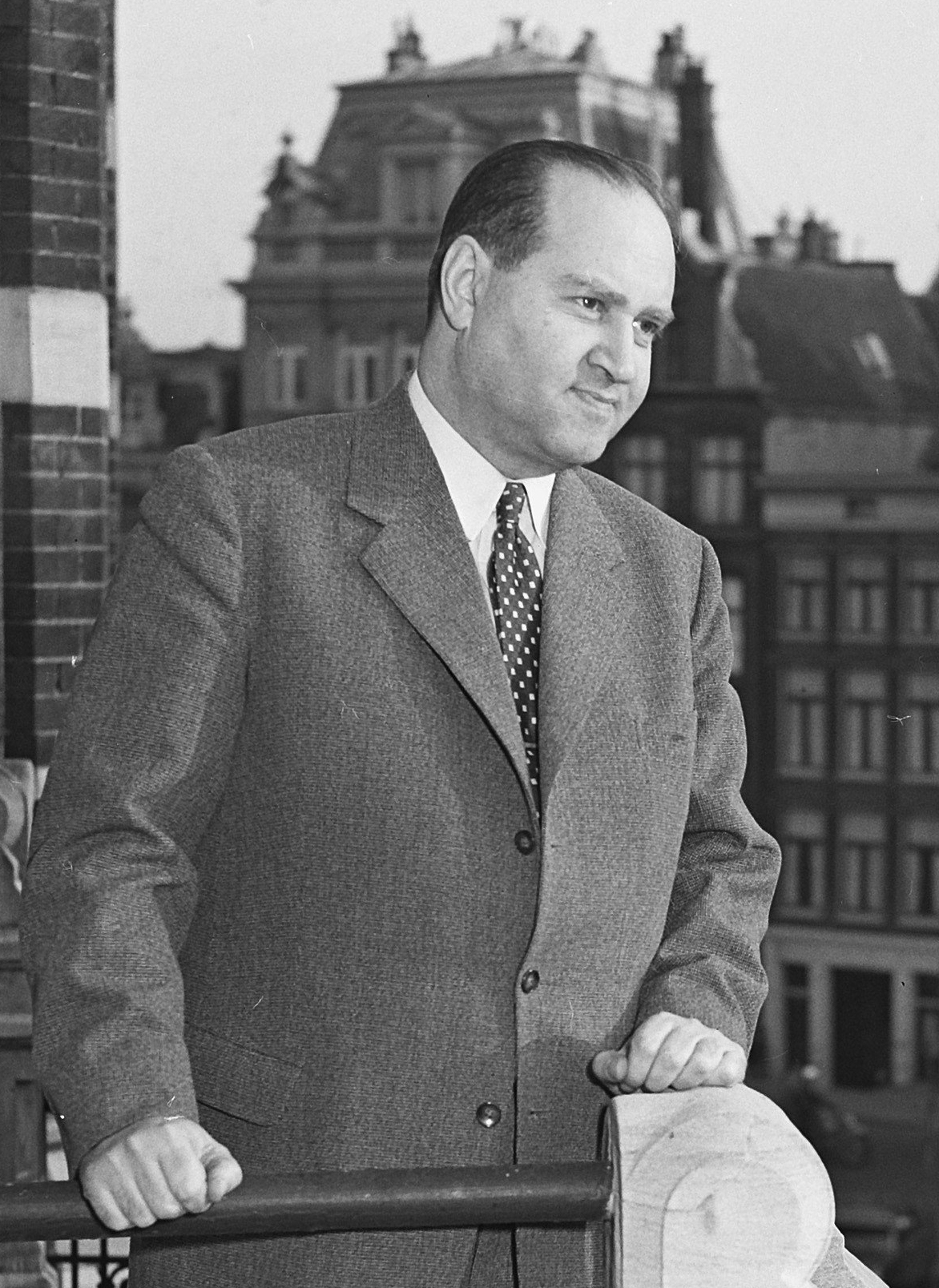
David Oistrakh

- David Oistrakh (1908–1974), violinist and conductor
- Alfred Amtman-Bredit (1885–1966), theater actor and director
- Igor Moiseyev (1906–2007), choreographer
- Alexander Kontantinovich Ilyinsy (1903–1967), theater and movie actor
- Konstantin Skorobogatov (1887–1969), theater and movie actor

=== 1954 ===
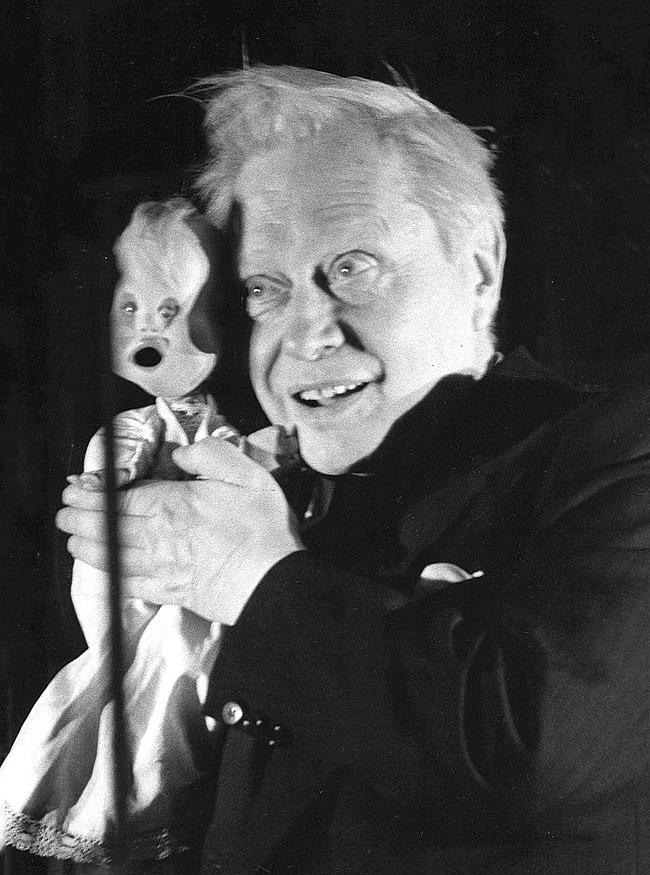
Sergey Obraztsov

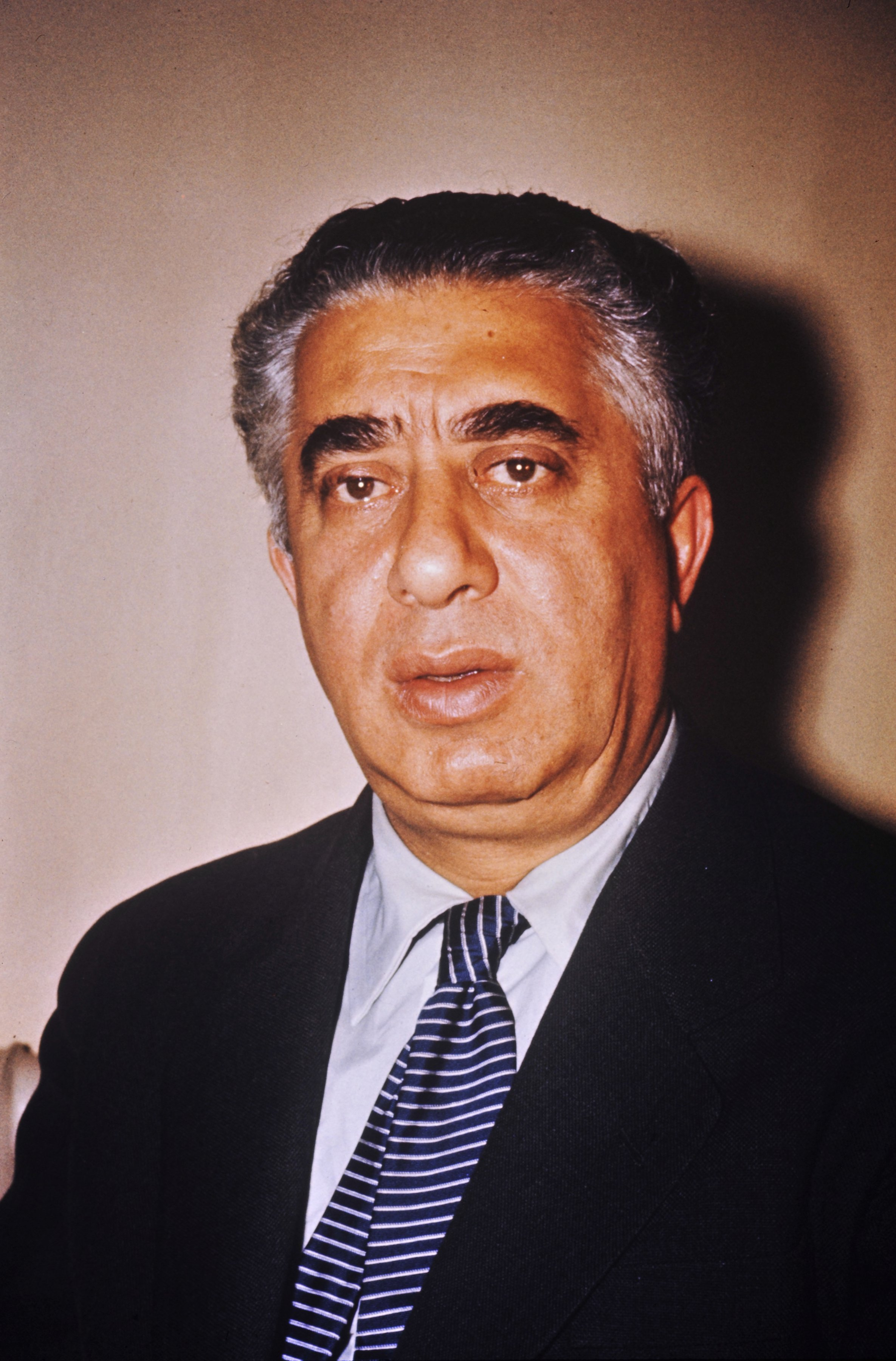
Aram Khachaturian

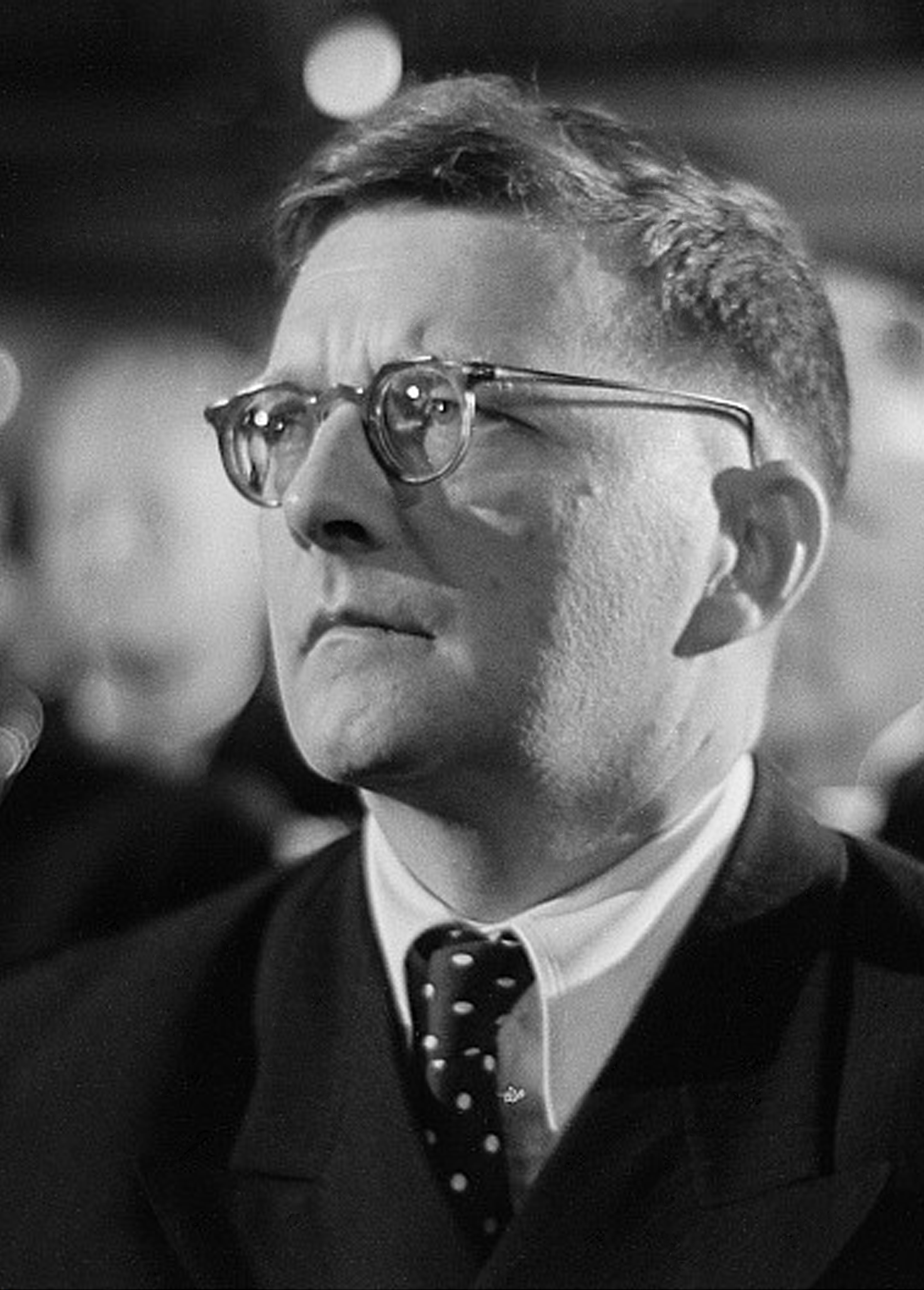
Dmitri Shostakovich

- Maria Babanova (1900–1983), theater and movie actress
- Lev Sverdlin (1901–1969), theater and movie actor
- Tiit Kuusik (1911–1990), opera singer (baritone)
- Balys Dvarionas (1904–1972), composer, conductor, pianist and pedagogyst
- Juozas Siparis (1894–1970), theater and movie actor
- Jonas Švedas (1908–1971), composer and conductor
- Leonid Sergeevich Vivian (1887–1966), actor, director, theater teacher
- Emil Gilels (1916–1985), pianist
- Yevgeny Mravinsky (1903–1988) (bypassing the title of People's Artist of the RSFSR), conductor
- Aram Khachaturian (1903–1978), composer
- Yuri Shaporin (1887–1966), composer
- Dmitri Shostakovich (1906–1975), composer
- Sergey Obraztsov (1901–1992), theatrical figure, actor and director of the puppet theater
- Vagharsh Vagharshian (1894–1959), theater actor, director, playwright
- Daniil Antonovich (1889–1975), theater and movie actor
- Petr Belinnik (1906–1998), opera singer (lyric tenor)
- Aleksandra Voronovich (1898–1985), theater actress
- Konstantyn Dankevych (1905–1984), composer, pianist, teacher
- Vasyl Yaremenko (1895–1976), actor

=== 1955 ===
- Nikolay Yakushenko (1897–1971), actor
- Vladimir Vladomirskiy (1893–1971), theater actor
- Lidiya Ivanovna Rzhetskaya (1899–1977), theater and movie actress
- Jewgeni Karlowitsch Tikoski (1893–1970), composer
- Ryhor Ramanavich Shyrma (1892–1978), choir conductor, folklorist
- Mikhail Yanshin (1902–1976), theater and movie actor
- Arslan Muboryakov (1908–1977), theater and film actor, theater director
- Zaytuna Nasretdinova (1923–2009), ballet dancer
- Mikhail Astangov (1900–1965), theater and film actor
- Sofia Preobrazhenskaya (1904–1966), opera singer (mezzo-soprano)
- Alty Karliev (1909–1973), theater actor and director, film actor, film director
- Maya Kuliyeva (1920–2018), opera singer (lyric soprano)
- Sona Muradova (1914–1997), theater actress
- Sofya Giatsintova (1895–1982), theater actress and director, film actress

=== 1956 ===
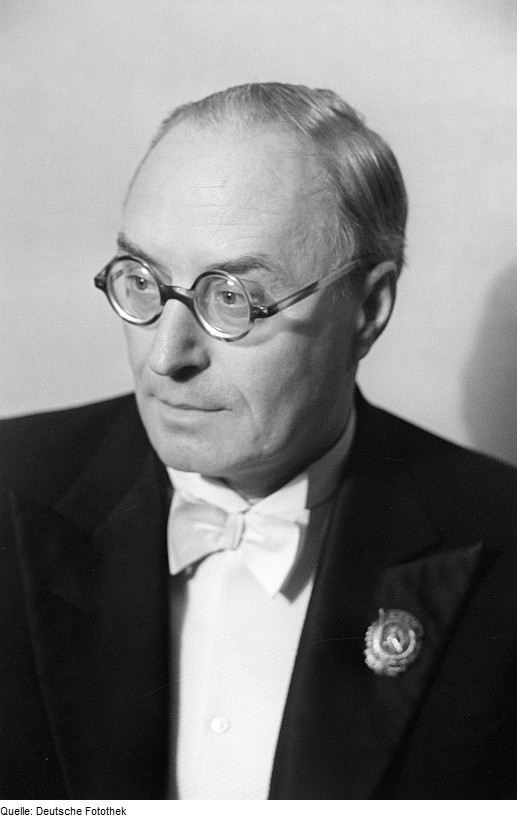
Alexander Svechnikov

- Lilita Bērziņa (1903–1983), theater and film actress
- Janis Osis (1895–1973), theater and movie actor
- Yuri Yurovsky (1894–1959), theater actor and director, film actor
- Nikolay Vorvulev (1917–1967), opera singer
- Yuri Tolubeyev (1906–1979), theater and movie actor
- Tamara Khanum (1906–1991), dancer, founder of the Uzbek ballet
- Gohar Gasparyan (1924–2007), opera singer (soprano)
- Hrachia Nersisyan (1895–1961), theater and film actor
- Vahram Papazian (1888–1968), theater actor
- Tatevik Sazandaryan (1916–1999), opera singer (mezzo-soprano)
- Mikael Tabrizyan (1907–1957), conductor
- Grigori Belov (1895–1965), theater and movie actor
- Pavel Lisitsian (1911–2004), opera singer (baritone)
- Aleksandr Larikov (1890–1960), theater actor
- Vasiliy Yakovlevich Sofronov (1884–1960), theater and movie actor
- Boris Ilyin (1901–1979), theater actor
- Aleksandr Bryantsev (1883–1961), theater director
- Alexander Svechnikov (1890–1980), choral conductor
- Aleksei Krivchenya (1910–1974), opera singer (bass)
- Eugen Kapp (1908–1996), composer
- Kaarel Karm (1906–1979), theater and movie actor
- Gustav Ernesaks (1908–1993), composer and choir conductor

=== 1957 ===
- Anastasia Zuyeva (1896–1986), theater and film actress
- Gulomkhaydar Gulomaliev (1904–1961), choreographer
- Lutfi Zohidova (1925–1995), ballet dancer
- Tuhfa Fozilova (1917–1985), opera singer (soprano)
- Xälil Äbcälilef (1896–1963), theater and movie actor
- Näcip Cihanov (1911–1988), composer
- Elena Zhilina (1890–1963), theater actress
- Natalia Dudinskaya (1912–2003), ballet dancer
- Konstantin Laptev (1904–1990), opera singer
- Vitali Politseymako (1906–1967), theater and movie actor
- Konstantin Sergeyev (1910–1992), ballet dancer, choreographer
- Georgy Tovstonogov (1915–1989), theater director

=== 1958 ===
- Vasiliy Mestnikov (1908–1958), theater actor and director
- Dmitriy Khodulov (1912–1977), theater actor and director
- Boris Alexandrovich Alexandrov (1905–1994), composer, conductor
- Konstantin Ivanov (1907–1984), conductor
- Vaso Godziashvili (1905–1976), theater and movie actor
- Odysseas Dimitriadis (1908–2005), conductor
- Sergo Zakariadze (1909–1971), theater and movie actor
- Aleksi Machavariani (1913–1995), composer
- Iliko Sukhishvili (1907–1985), ballet dancer
- Bubusara Beyshenalieva (1926–1973), ballet dancer
- Sayra Kiizbaeva (1917–1988), opera singer (lyric-dramatic soprano)
- Muratbek Ryskulov (1909–1974), theater and movie actor
- Sergei Ivanovich Papov (1904–1970) theater and movie actor

=== 1959 ===
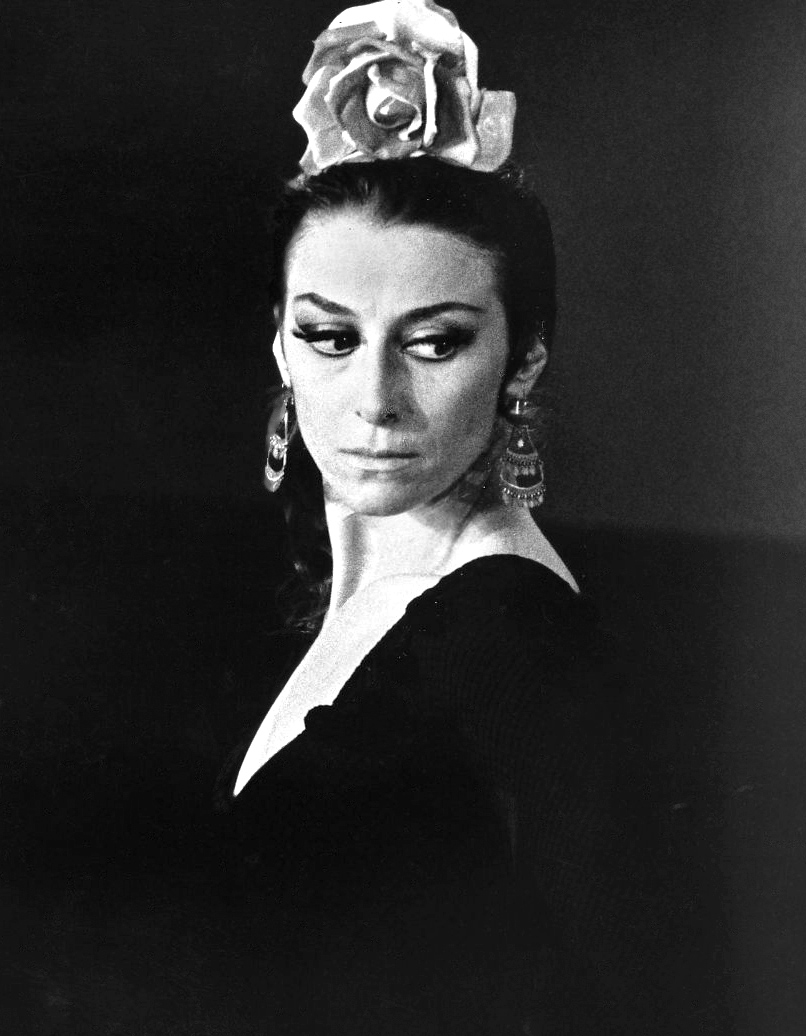
Maya Plisetskaya

- Shaken Ajmanov (1914–1970), actor and film director
- Roza Jamanova (1928–2013), opera singer (soprano)
- Kalibek Kuanyshpaev (1893–1968), theater and movie actor
- Ermek Serkebayev (1926–2013), opera singer (lyric baritone)
- Mukan Tulebaev (1913–1960), composer
- Valentina Kharlamova (1911–1999), theater actress
- Shukur Burkhanov (1910–1987), theater and film actor
- Saodat Kabulova (1925–2007), opera singer (lyric-coloratura soprano)
- Mukarram Turgunbaeva (1913–1978), ballet dancer
- Olim Xoʻjayev (1910–1977), theater and film actor
- Kamil Yarmatov (1903–1978), actor, film director, screenwriter
- Nikolay Pokrovskiy (1896–1961), theater actor and director
- Gamar Almaszadeh (1915–2006), ballet dancer
- Rashid Behbudov (1915–1989), pop and opera singer (lyric tenor)
- Adil Isgandarov (1912–1978), theater actor and director
- Gara Garayev (1918–1982), composer
- Niyazi (1912–1984), conductor, composer
- Ivan Ivanovich Petrov (1920–2003), opera singer (bass)
- Maya Plisetskaya (1925–2015), ballet dancer
- Raisa Struchkova (1925–2005), ballet dancer
- Liisa Tomberg (1909–1988), stage actress
- Lkhasaran Linkhovoin (1924–1980), opera singer (bass)

=== 1960 ===
- Nikolay Akimov (1901–1968), painter, theater artist, director and teacher
- Nikolay Annenkov (1899–1999), theater and film actor
- Vasily Orlov (1896–1974), theater actor, director, theater teacher
- Angelina Stepanova (1905–2000), theater and film actress
- Bariyat Muradova (1914–2001), stage actress
- Nina Masalskaya (1901–1989), actress
- Tamara Ceban (1914–1990), opera singer (soprano)
- Chiril Știrbu (1915–1997), stage actor
- Vladimir Chestnokov (1904–1968), theater and film actor, theater teacher
- Georg Ots (1920–1975), opera singer (baritone)
- Vladimir Tkhapsaev (1910–1981), theater and film actor
- Vasili Merkuryev (1904–1978), theater and film actor, teacher
- Evgeniy Bondarenko (1905–1977), theater and film actor
- Pavlo Virsky (1905–1975), ballet dancer, choreographer
- Dmytro Hnatyuk (1925–2016), opera singer (baritone)(bypassing the title of People's Artist of the Ukrainian SSR)
- Volodymyr Dalsky (1912–1998), stage actor
- Viktor Dobrovolsky (1906–1984), theater and film actor
- Pavlo Karmaliuk (1908–1986), opera singer (baritone)
- Polina Kumanchenko (1910–1992), theater and film actress
- Yuri Lavrov (1905–1980), theater and film actor
- Vladimir Magar (1900–1965), theater actor and director
- Heorhiy Maiboroda (1913–1992), composer
- Dmitri Milyutenko (1899–1966), theater and film actor
- Oleksandr Minkivskyi (1900–1979), choral conductor
- Yevhen Ponomarenko (1909–1994), theater and film actor
- Bela Rudenko (1933–2021), opera singer (lyric-coloratura soprano)
- Larisa Rudenko (1918–1981), opera singer (mezzo-soprano)
- Lidiya Myasnikova (1911–2005), opera singer (mezzo-soprano)

=== 1961 ===
- Sviatoslav Richter (1915–1997), pianist
- Alasgar Alakbarov (1910–1963), theater and film actor
- Faina Ranevskaya (1896–1984), theater and film actress
- Rostislav Plyatt (1908–1989), theater and film actor
- Petr Kaz'min (1892–1964), folklorist
- Tatyana Alekseevna Ustinova (1909–1999), choreographer
- Mark Prudkin (1898–1994), theater and film actor
- Boris Pokrovsky (1912–2009), theater director

=== 1962 ===
- Iosif Tolchanov (1891–1981), theater and film actor, director
- Sergei Yutkevich (1904–1985), theater and film director
- Galiya Izmaylova (1923–2010), ballet dancer
- Boris Andreyev (1915–1982), theater and film actor
- Avet Avetisyan (1897–1971), theater and film actor
- Pavel Serebryakov (1909–1977), pianist, teacher
- Artūrs Frinbergs (1916–1984), opera singer (dramatic tenor)
- Vakhtang Vronsky (1905–1988), choreographer
- Konstantin Simeonov (1910–1987), conductor, teacher

=== 1963 ===
- Sergei Blinnikov (1901–1969), theater and film actor, theater director
- Anatoly Ktorov (1898–1980), theater and film actor
- Pavel Massalsky (1904–1979), theater and film actor
- Boris Petker (1902–1983), theater and film actor
- Boris Aleksandrovich Smirnov (1908–1982), theater and film actor
- Dmitry Kabalevsky (1904–1987), composer
- Tikhon Khrennikov (1913–2007), composer
- Boris Babochkin (1904–1975), theater and film actor, theater teacher
- Nino Ramishvili (1910–2000), dancer, choreographer
- Larisa Sakhyanova (1930–2001), ballet dancer

=== 1964 ===
- Bukeyeva Khadisha Bukeyevna (1917–2011), stage actress
- Yuli Raizman (1903–1994), film director
- Grigori Kozintsev (1905–1973), film and theater director, screenwriter
- Nikolai Gritsenko (1912–1979), theater and film actor
- Lev Oborin (1907–1974), pianist
- Tamara Nizhnikova (1925–2018), opera singer
- Ninel' Tkachenko (1928–2007), opera singer (soprano)
- Aleksandr Ivanov (1898–1984), film director
- Iosif Kheifits (1905–1995), film director
- Genovaitė Sabaliauskaitė (1923–2020), ballet dancer
- Jonas Stasiūnas (1919–1987), opera singer (baritone)
- Nar Ovanisyan (1913–1995), opera singer (bass)
- Iosif Tumanishvili (1909–1981), theater director
- Nabi Rakhimov (1911–1994), theater and film artist
- Ants Eskola (1908–1989), theater and film actor
- Firs Shishigin (1908–1985), theater director

=== 1965 ===
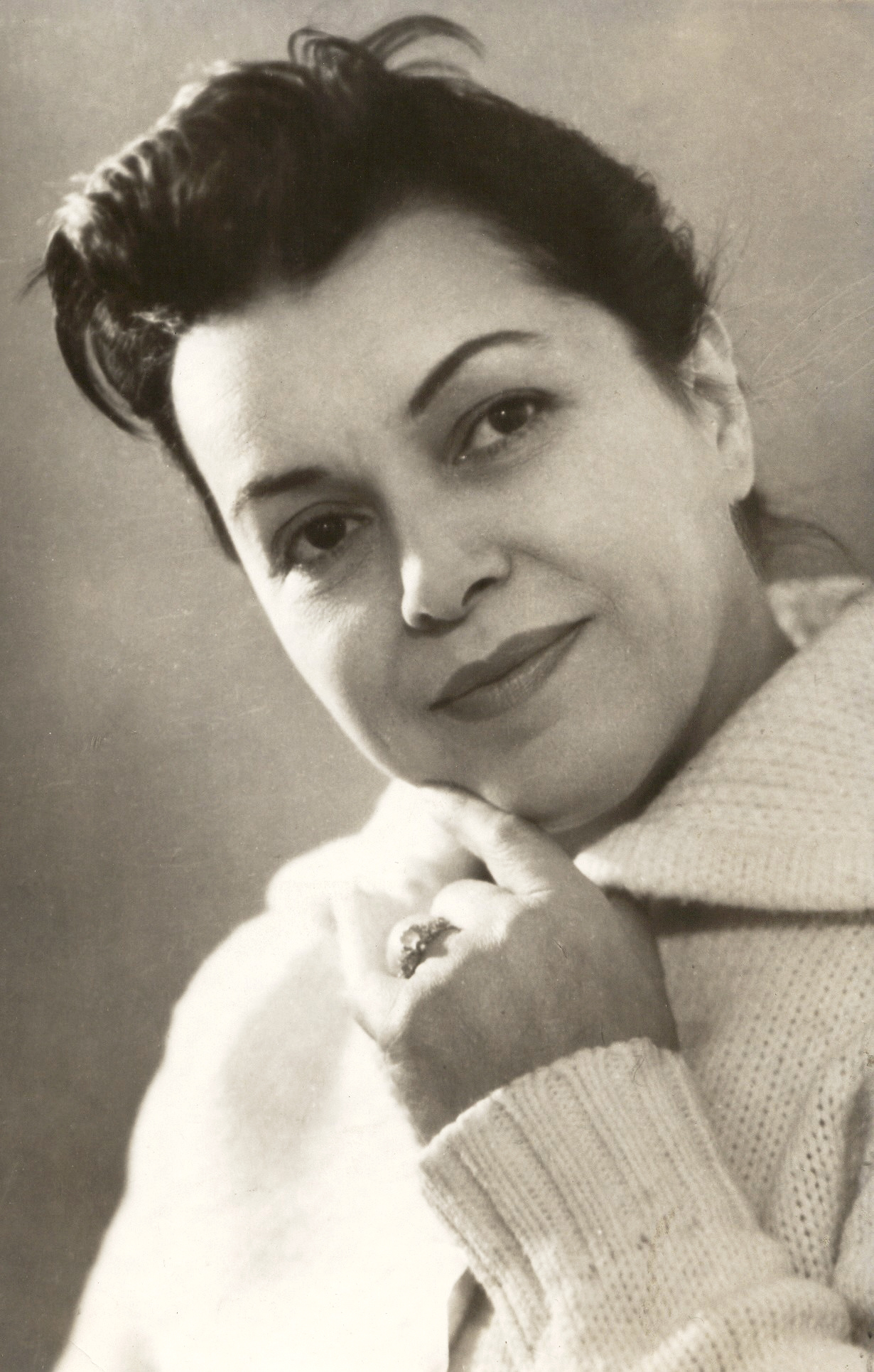
Hokuma Gurbanova

- Nikolay Krjuchkov (1911–1994), film actor
- Aleksandr Ognivtsev (1920–1981), opera singer (bass)
- Fikret Amirov (1922–1984), composer, pianist
- Hokuma Gurbanova (1913–1988), stage actress
- Vladimir Belokurov (1904–1973), theater and film actor
- Tatul Altunyan (1901–1973), choirmaster
- Bazar Amanov (1908–1981), stage actor, playwright
- Annagul Annakuliyeva (1924–2009), opera singer (soprano)
- Veli Mukhatov (1916–2005), composer
- Leonid Utyosov (1895–1982), entertainer, singer, conductor, film actor
- Leonid Lavrovsky (1905–1967), choreographer
- Asli Burkhanov (1915–1997), theater actor and director, film actor
- Lyubov Dobrzhanskaya (1908–1980), theater and film actress
- Andrei Popov (1918–1983), theater and film artist, theater director, teacher
- Evgeniya Miroshnichenko (1931–2009), opera singer (lyric-coloratura soprano)
- Mikhail Bolduman (1898–1983), theater and film actor
- Olena Katulska (1888–1966), opera singer (lyric-coloratura soprano)
- Velta Vilciņa (1928–1995), ballet dancer
- Jānis Ivanovs (1906–1983), composer
- Nikolay Svetlovidov (1889–1970), stage actor
- Vardan Ajemian (1905–1977), theater director
- Irina Kolpakova (b. 1933), ballet dancer
- Siko Dolidze (1903–1983), film director
- Maksim Shtraukh (1900–1974), theater and film actor

=== 1966 ===
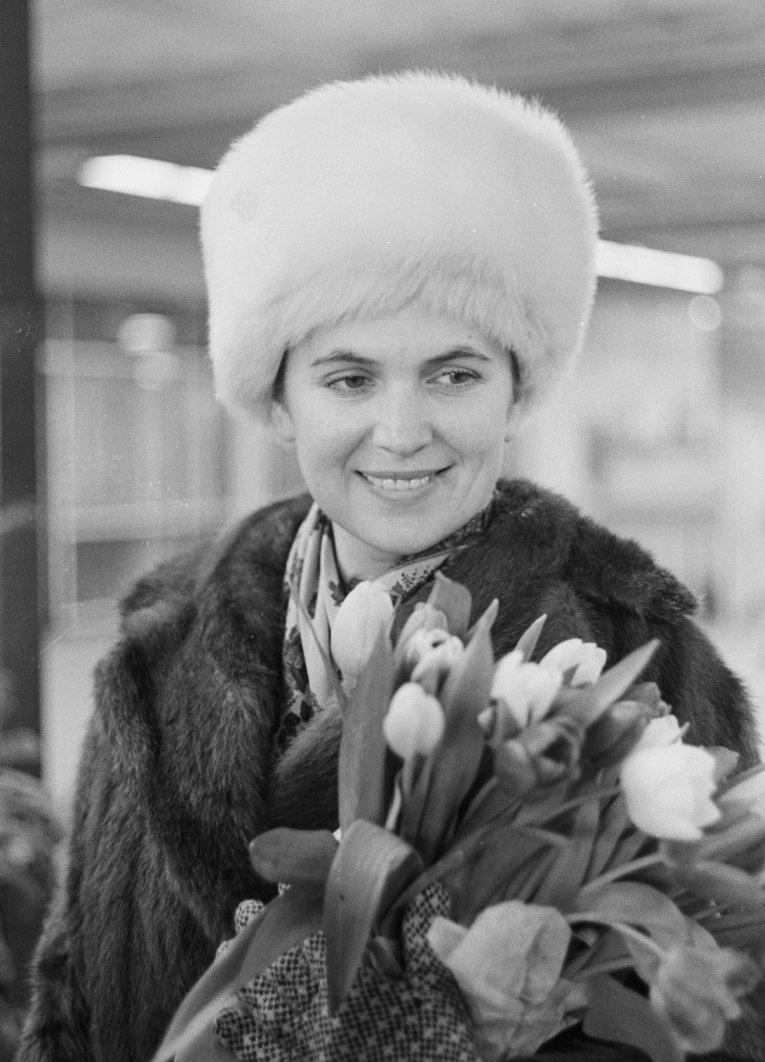
Galina Vishnevskaya

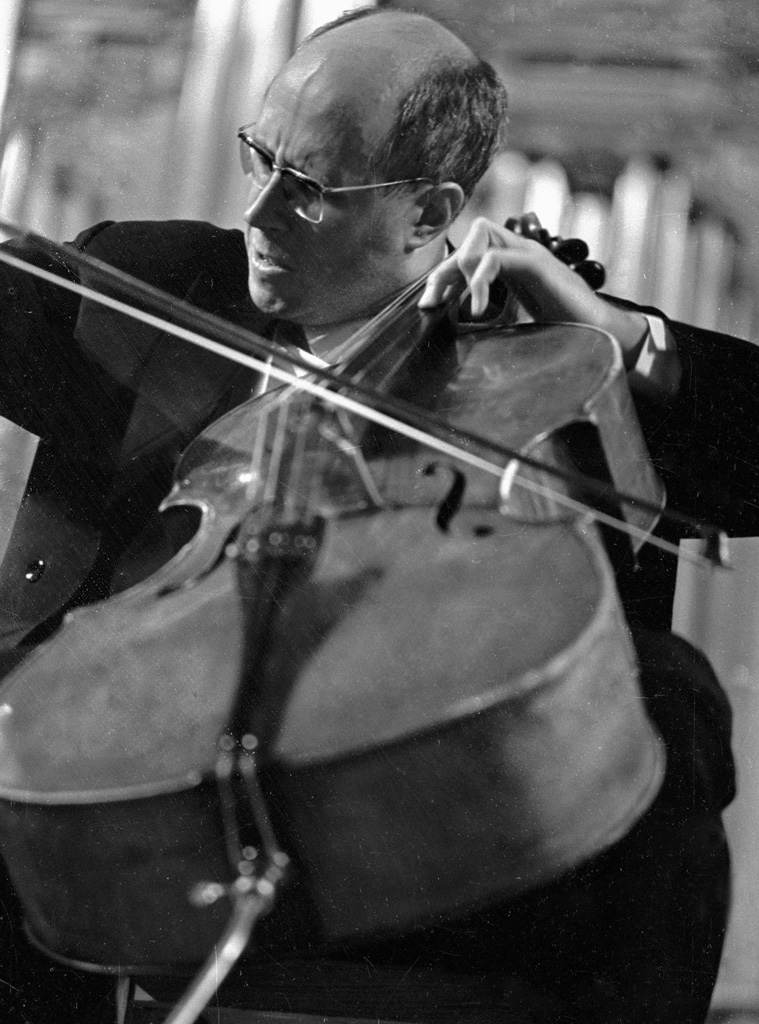
Mstislav Rostropovich

- Aino Talvi (1909–1992), stage actress
- Sesilia Takaishvili (1906–1984), theater and film actress
- Boris Shtokolov (1930–2005), opera singer (bass)
- Pyotr Konstantinov (1899–1973), theater and film actor
- Zurab Anjaparidze (1928–1997), opera singer (lyric-dramatic tenor)
- Irina Arkhipova (1925–2010), opera singer (mezzo-soprano)
- Galina Vishnevskaya (1926–2012), opera singer (soprano)
- Nadezhda Nadezhdina (1908–1979), ballet dancer and choreographer
- Yakov Zak (1913–1976), pianist, teacher
- Leonid Kogan (1924–1982), violinist
- Klavdiy Ptitsa (1911–1983), choral conductor
- Mstislav Rostropovich (1927–2007), cellist
- Vladislav Gennadievich Sokolov (1908–1993), choral conductor
- Yakov Flier (1912–1977), pianist
- Xenia Erdeli (1878–1971), harpist
- Leanid Rakhlenka (1907–1986), theater actor and director, film actor
- Nikolai Plotnikov (1897–1979), actor, director, theater teacher
- Roman Karmen (1906–1978), cinematographer, film director
- Mark Donskoy (1901–1981), film director and playwright

=== 1967 ===
- Georgi Assatijani (1914–1977), documentary film director and cinematographer
- Lyutfi Sarymsakova (1896–1991), theater and film actress
- Vasily Solovyov-Sedoi (1907–1979), composer
- Grigoriy Roshal (1898–1983), film director
- Rakhim Pirmukhamedov (1897–1972), theater and film actor
- Rishat Abdullin (1916–1988), opera singer (baritone)
- Roza Baglanova (1922–2011), opera and pop singer (soprano)
- Vladimir Durov (1909–1972), circus performer (tamer)
- Bibigul Tulegenova (b. 1929), opera singer (coloratura soprano)
- Lidia Chernysheva (1912–1975), ballet dancer, choreographer
- Vladimir Vladislavsky (1891–1970), theater and film actor
- Malik Kayumov (1912–2010), cinematographer, film director
- Darkul Kuyukova (1919–1997), theater and film actress
- Artyk Myrzabaev (1930–2005), opera singer (baritone)
- Olga Kusenko (1919–1997), theater and film actress
- Yevhen Chervoniuk (1924–1982), opera singer (bass)
- Boris Zakhava (1896–1976), theater actor and director
- Timofeĭ Ivanovich Gurtovoĭ (1919–1981), conductor
- Eugeniu Ureche (1917–2005), theater and film actor, singer
- Heino Eller (1887–1970), composer, teacher
- Gurgen Janibekyan (1897–1978), theater and film actor
- Franghiz Ahmadova (1928–2011), opera singer (soprano)
- Leyla Vakilova (1927–1999), ballet dancer
- Evgeny Belyaev (1926–1994), singer (lyric tenor)
- Alexey Sergeev (1919–1998), singer (bass)

=== 1968 ===
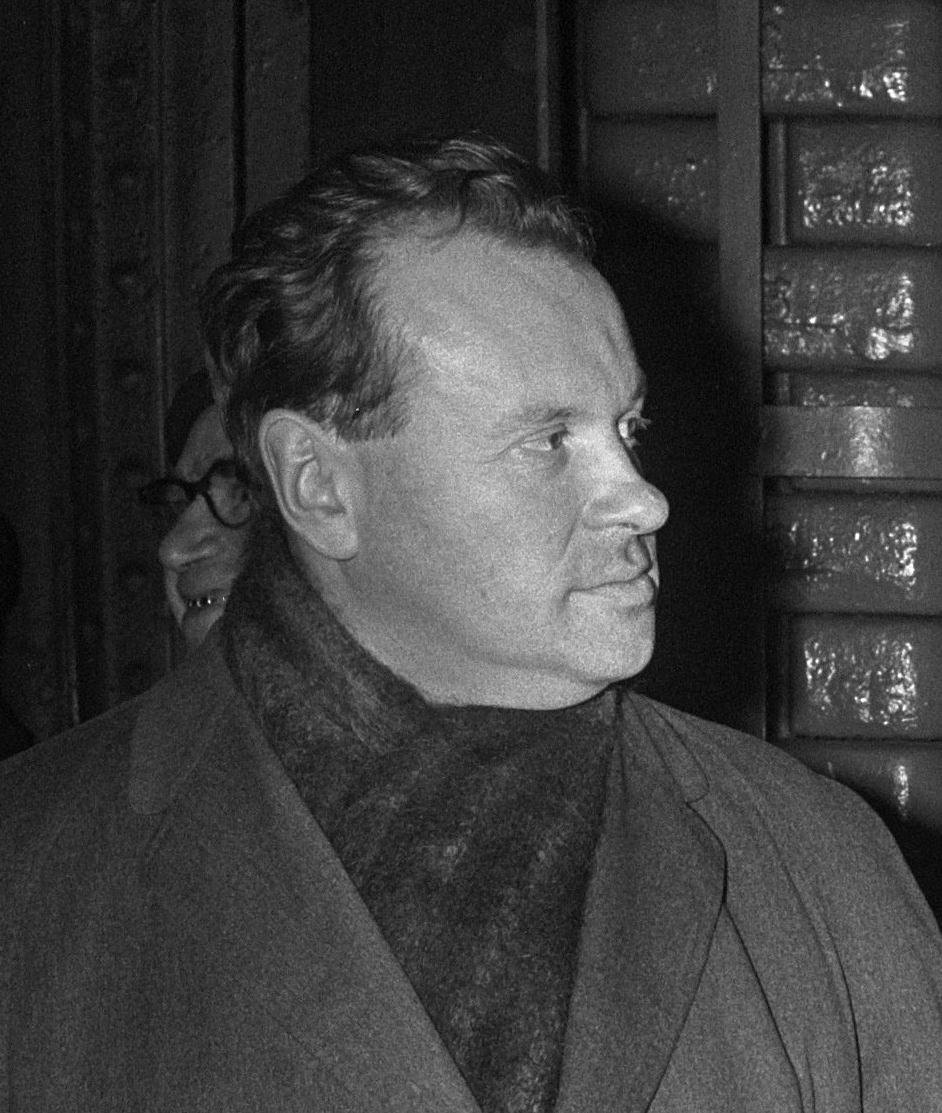
Yevgeny Svetlanov

- Yevgeni Lebedev (1917–1997), theater and film actor
- Antonina Samarina (1892–1971), stage actress
- Yuri Gulyayev (1930–1986), opera singer (lyric baritone)
- Valentyna Kalynovska (1938–2025), ballet dancer
- Andria Balanchivadze (1906–1992), composer
- Ilya Kopalin (1900–1976), documentary filmmaker
- Archil Chkhartishvili (1905–1980), theater director
- Elena Mitrofanovna Shatrova-Kazankova (1892–1976), stage actress
- Andrei Abrikosov (1906–1973), theater and film actor
- Hanifa Mavlianova (1924–2010), opera singer (soprano)
- Arkady Raikin (1911–1987), theater and film actor
- Oyimxon Shomurotova (1917–1993), stage actress
- Jazep Žynovič (1907–1974), composer and conductor
- Vano Muradeli (1908–1970), composer
- Zdzislaw Stoma (1907–1992), theater and film actor
- Gennady Ivanovich Tsitovich (1910–1986), choir conductor, musicologist
- Yevgeny Svetlanov (1928–2002), conductor
- Anastasiya Georgiyevskaya (1914–1990), theater and film actress
- Boris Ravenskikh (1914–1980), theatre director
- Aleksey Zhiltsov (1895–1972), stage actor
- Iosif Raevskiy (1901–1972), actor, director, teacher

=== 1969 ===
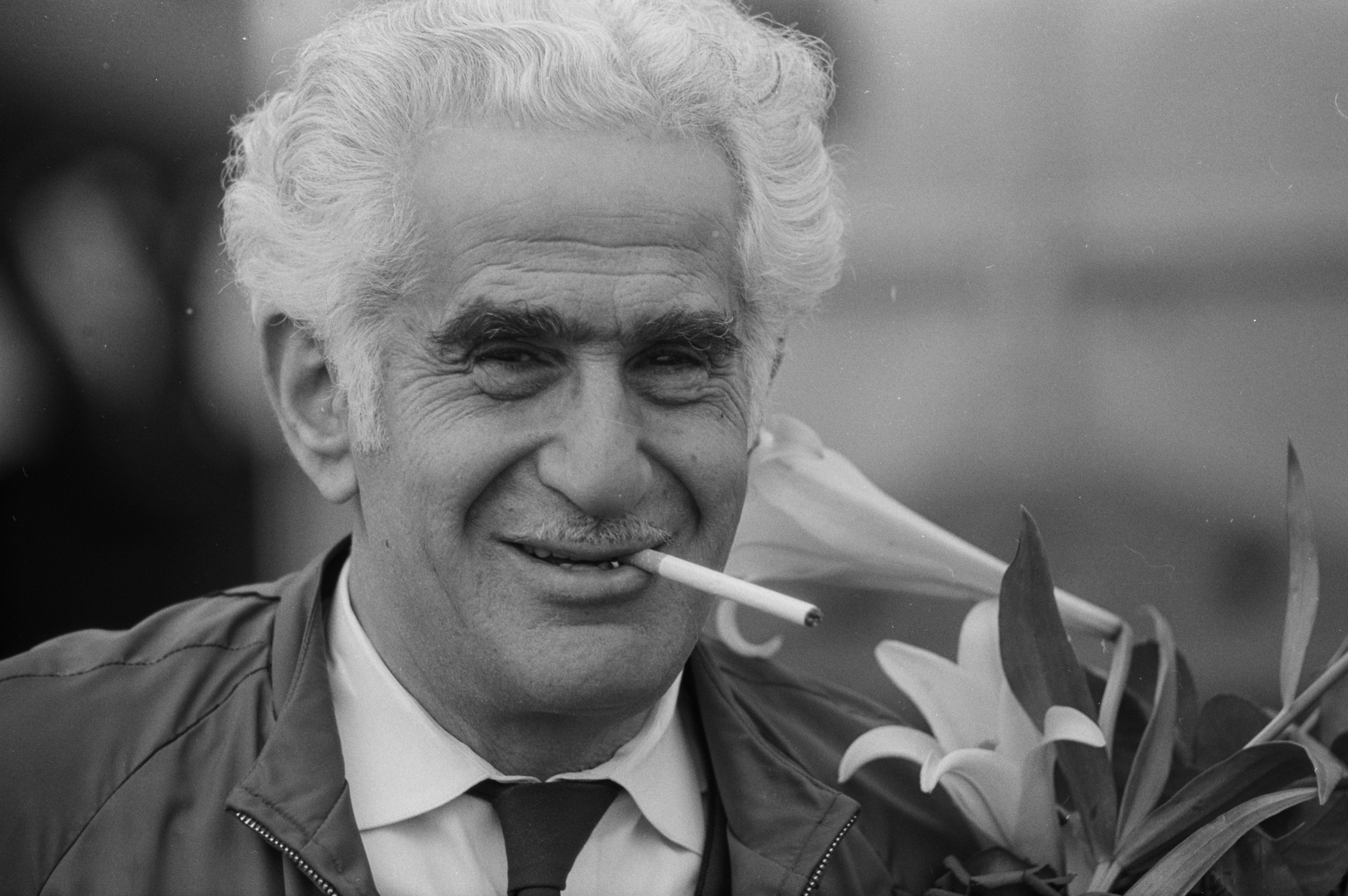
Aleksandr Zarkhi

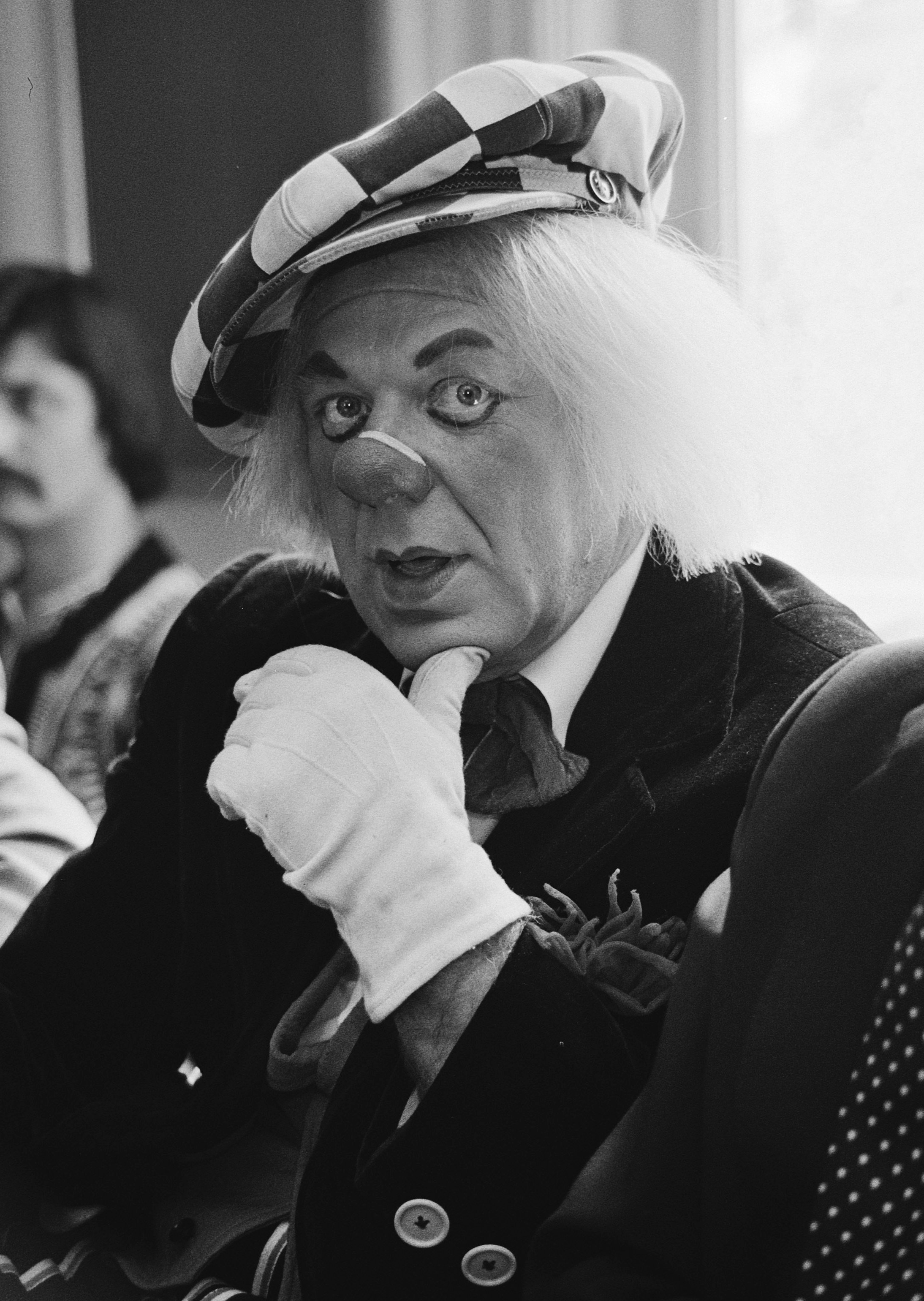
Oleg Popov

- Razak Khamrayev (1910–1981), theater and film actor and director
- Vija Artmane (1929–2008), theater and film actress
- Žermēna Heine-Vāgnere (1923–2017), opera singer (lyric-dramatic soprano)
- Nina Timofeeva (1935–2014), ballet dancer
- Boris Alekseyev (1911–1973), stage actor
- Yuliya Borisova (1925–2023), theater and film actress
- Yefim Dzigan (1898–1981), film director
- Oleg Zhakov (1905–1988), film actor
- Aleksandr Zarkhi (1908–1997), film director
- Alexander Zguridi (1904–1998), film director, TV presenter
- Mikhail Kalatozov (1903–1973), film director
- Vladimir Korsh (1900–1974), film director
- Aleksandr Ptushko (1900–1973), film director
- Vsevolod Sanayev (1912–1996), theater and film actor
- Mikhail Ulyanov (1927–2007), theater and film actor
- Irina Bugrimova (1910–2001), circus performer (lion trainer)
- Eugene Milaev (1910–1983), circus performer, equilibrist
- Oleg Popov (1930–2016), circus clown
- Karandash (Mikhail Nikolayevich Rumyantsev; 1901–1983), circus clown
- Valentin Filatov (1920–1979), circus performer (tamer)
- Aleksandra Klimova (1921–2005), stage actress
- Evgeniy Polosin (1912–1982), theater and film actor
- Galina Zagurskaya (1905–1978), stage actress
- Stanyslav Lyudkevych (1879–1979), composer
- Rostislav Zakharov (1907–1984), choreographer, director

=== 1970 ===
- Anatoly Novikov (1896–1984), composer
- Juozas Lingys (1919–1984), ballet dancer, choreographer
- Kaarel Ird (1909–1986), theater actor and director
- Olena Potapova (b. 1930), ballet dancer
- Abbos Bakirov (1910–1974), theater actor and director
- Maria Bieșu (1934–2012), opera singer (lyric-dramatic soprano)
- Lidiya Freimane (1920–1992), stage actress
- Baken Kydykeyeva (1923–1993), theater and film actress
- Ivan Lyubeznov (1909–1988), theater and film actor
- Violetta Bovt (1927–1995), ballet dancer
- Stepan Kevorkov (1903–1991), film director
- Klavdia Kudriashova (1925–2012), opera singer (mezzo-soprano)
- Virgilijus Noreika (1935–2018), opera singer (tenor)
- Georgy Sviridov (1915–1998), composer
- Aleksey Yermolayev (1910–1975), ballet dancer, choreographer, teacher
- Lidiya Knyazeva (1925–1987), theater and film actress
- Valentina Sperantova (1904–1978), theater and film actress
- Evgeniy Diordiev (1912–1985), theater actor and director, film actor
- Sabira Maykanova (1914–1994), stage actress
- Vladimir Burmeister (1904–1971), choreographer
- Alexander Arutiunian (1920–2012), composer
- Marģeris Zariņš (1910–1993), composer
- Vladimir Kandelaki (1908–1994), opera singer (bass-baritone) and director

=== 1971 ===
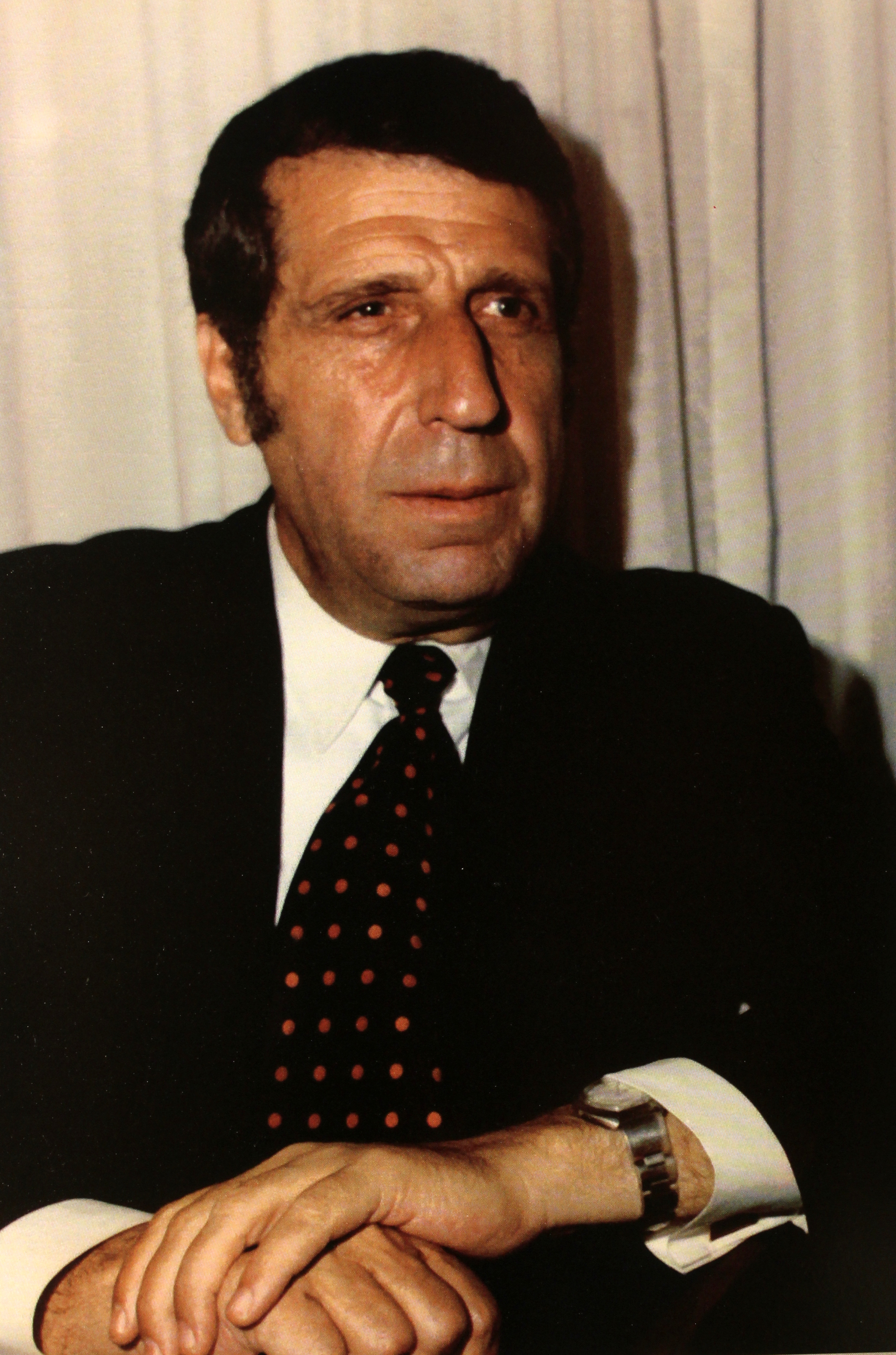
Arno Babajanian

- Lidia Krupenina (1928–2016), ballet dancer
- Yury Durov (1910–1971), circus performer, trainer
- Dodo Antadze (1900–1978), theater actor and director
- Uladzimir Dziadziuška (1905–1973), theater and film actor
- Ata Durdyev (1910–1981), theater and film actor
- Arkadiy Hashynsky (1920–1991), stage actor
- Hrachya Ghaplanyan (1923–1988), theater director
- Mikhail Kuznetsov (1913–1995), theater and film actor
- Klavdiya Shulzhenko (1906–1984), pop singer
- Arno Babajanian (1921–1983), composer
- Akhmad Babakulov (1931–1990), opera singer (dramatic tenor)
- Alexander Rybnov (1906–1992), choral conductor
- Mikhail Kirillov (1900–1971), theater actor and director
- Nikolai Ryzhov (1900–1986), actor
- Anatoly Alexandrov (1888–1982), composer, pianist, teacher
- Maria Maksakova Sr. (1902–1974), opera singer (mezzo-soprano)
- Erasmus Alexandrovich Karamyan (1912–1985), film director
- Aleksandr Kasyanov (1891–1982), composer, teacher
- Yelizaveta Alekseyeva (1901–1972), stage actress
- Tsetsilia Mansurova (1896–1976), theater and film actress

=== 1972 ===
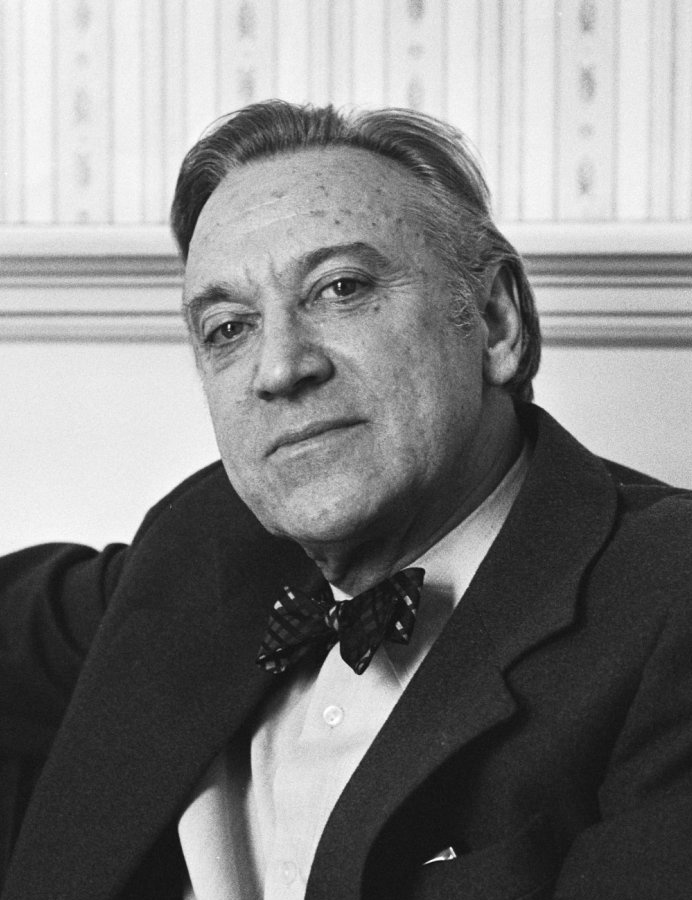
Kirill Kondrashin

- Timofiy Levchuk (1912–1998), film director
- Natalya Burmistrova (1918–2008), stage actress
- Tatyana Pelttser (1904–1992), theater and film actress
- Kirill Kondrashin (1914–1981), conductor
- Boris Khaikin (1904–1978), conductor
- Igor Gorbachyov (1927–2003), theater actor and director, film actor
- Kirill Lavrov (1925–2007), theater and film actor
- Leonid Tarabarinov (1928–2008), theater and film actor
- Nadezhda Dotsenko (1914–1994), stage actress
- Arus Asryan (1904–1987), stage actress
- Babken Nersisyan (1917–1986), theater and film actor
- Andriy Shtoharenko (1902–1992), composer, teacher

=== 1973 ===
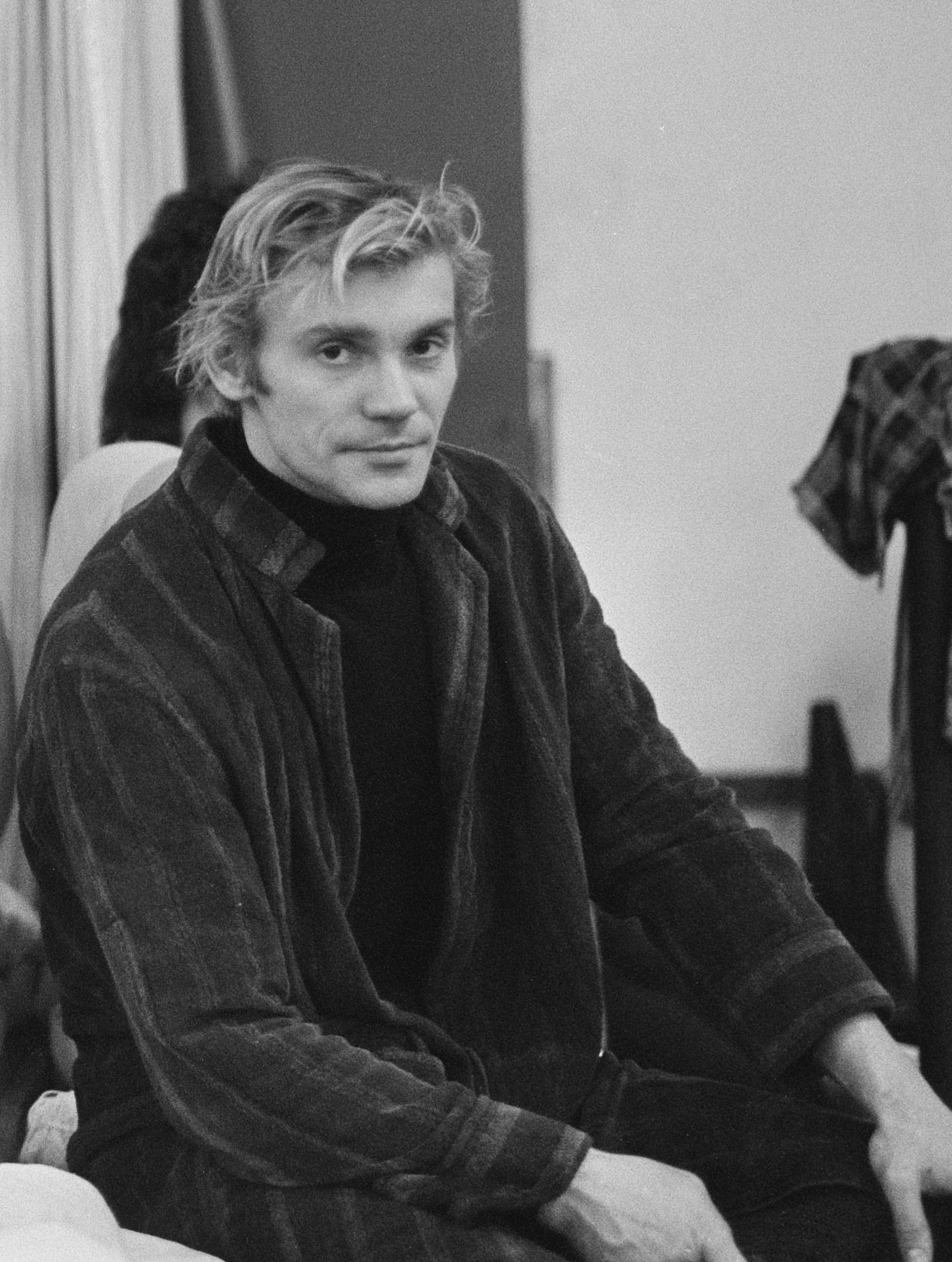
Vladimir Vasiliev

- Raisa Sergienko (1925–1987), opera singer (lyric-dramatic soprano)
- Aleksandr Khanov (1904–1983), stage actor
- Lyudmila Zykina (1929–2009), singer
- Yury Grigorovich (1927–2025), ballet dancer, choreographer
- Bernara Karieva (b. 1936), ballet dancer
- Zaituna Bikbulatova (1908–1992), stage actress
- Alfrēds Jaunušans (1919–2008), theater actor and director
- Soltan Hajibeyov (1919–1974), composer
- Tamara Milashkina (1934–2024), opera singer (soprano)
- Yefim Kopelyan (1912–1975), theater and film actor
- Juozas Miltinis (1907–1994), theater director
- Vladimir Vasiliev (b. 1940), ballet dancer and choreographer
- Ekaterina Maximova (1939–2009), ballet dancer
- Anatoli Papanov (1922–1987), theater and film actor
- Viktor Khokhryakov (1913–1986), theater and film actor
- Andrey Prisyazhnyuk (1912–1982), stage actor
- Velta Līne (1923–2012), theater and film actress
- Nina Ivanovna Menovshchikova (1934–2022), ballet dancer
- Muslim Magomayev (1942–2008), opera and pop singer (baritone), soloist of the Azerbaijan State Academic Opera and Ballet Theater
- Sofia Golovkina (1915–2004), ballet dancer and teacher
- Yuri Nikulin (1921–1997), circus performer, film actor
- Yuri Soloviev (1940–1977), ballet dancer

=== 1974 ===
- Malika Sobirova (1942–1982), ballet dancer
- Yevgeny Matveyev (1922–2003), theater and film actor, film director
- Nonna Mordyukova (1925–2008), film actress
- Domnica Darienco (1919–2010), stage actress
- David Malyan (1904–1976), theater and film actor
- Vladislav Strzhelchik (1921–1995), theater and film actor
- Lidiya Smirnova (1913–2007), theater and film actress
- Galina Vladimirovna Kovaleva (1932–1995), opera singer (coloratura soprano)
- Ismayil Daghistanli (1907–1980), stage actor
- Ismayil Osmanli (1902–1978), theater and film actor
- Makhmud Esambayev (1924–2000), dancer
- Mehdi Mammadov (1918–1985), theater director
- Stanislav Rostotsky (1922–2001), film director
- Otar Taktakishvili (1924–1989), composer
- Vyacheslav Tikhonov (1928–2009), film actor
- Georgi Menglet (1912–2001), theater and film actor
- Karlis Sebris (1914–2009), theater and film actor
- Valentin Pluchek (1909–2002), theater director, actor
- Yevgeny Samoylov (1912–2006), theater and film actor
- Innokenty Smoktunovsky (1925–1994), theater and film actor
- Ninel Kurgapkina (1929–2009), ballet dancer
- Nikolay Volchkov (1910—2003?), theater artist
- Yury Kiselyov (1914–1996), theater actor and director
- Bruno Freindlich (1909–2002), theater and film actor
- Donatas Banionis (1924–2014), theater and film actor

=== 1975 ===
- Marina Semyonova (1908–2010), ballet dancer
- Anatoliy Solovianenko (1932–1999), opera singer, tenor
- Vladimir Zeldin (1915–2016), theater and film actor
- Lyudmila Kasatkina (1925–2012), theater and film actress
- Ivan Marin (1905–1983), theater and film actor
- Ivan Pereverzev (1914–1978), theater and film actor
- Diana Petrynenko (1930–2018), singer (lyric-coloratura soprano)
- Fyodor Ivanovych Shmakov (1917–2009), theater and film actor
- Dmitry Pokrass (1899–1978), composer
- Evgeniĭ Simonov (1925–1994), theater director
- Matvey Blanter (1903–1990), composer
- Medeniyet Shahberdiyeva (1930–2018), opera singer (coloratura soprano)
- Konstantin Iraklievich Massalitinov (1905–1979), composer, choir conductor
- Natalya Sats (1903–1993), theater director
- Michail Alekseevitsj Koelikovskiy (1906–1996), theater actor and director
- Jurij Silantiev (1919–1983), conductor, composer
- Fuat Xalitef (1909–1981), stage actor
- Valeriy Nel'skiy (1906–1990), stage actor
- Jüri Järvet (1919–1995), theater and film actor

=== 1976 ===
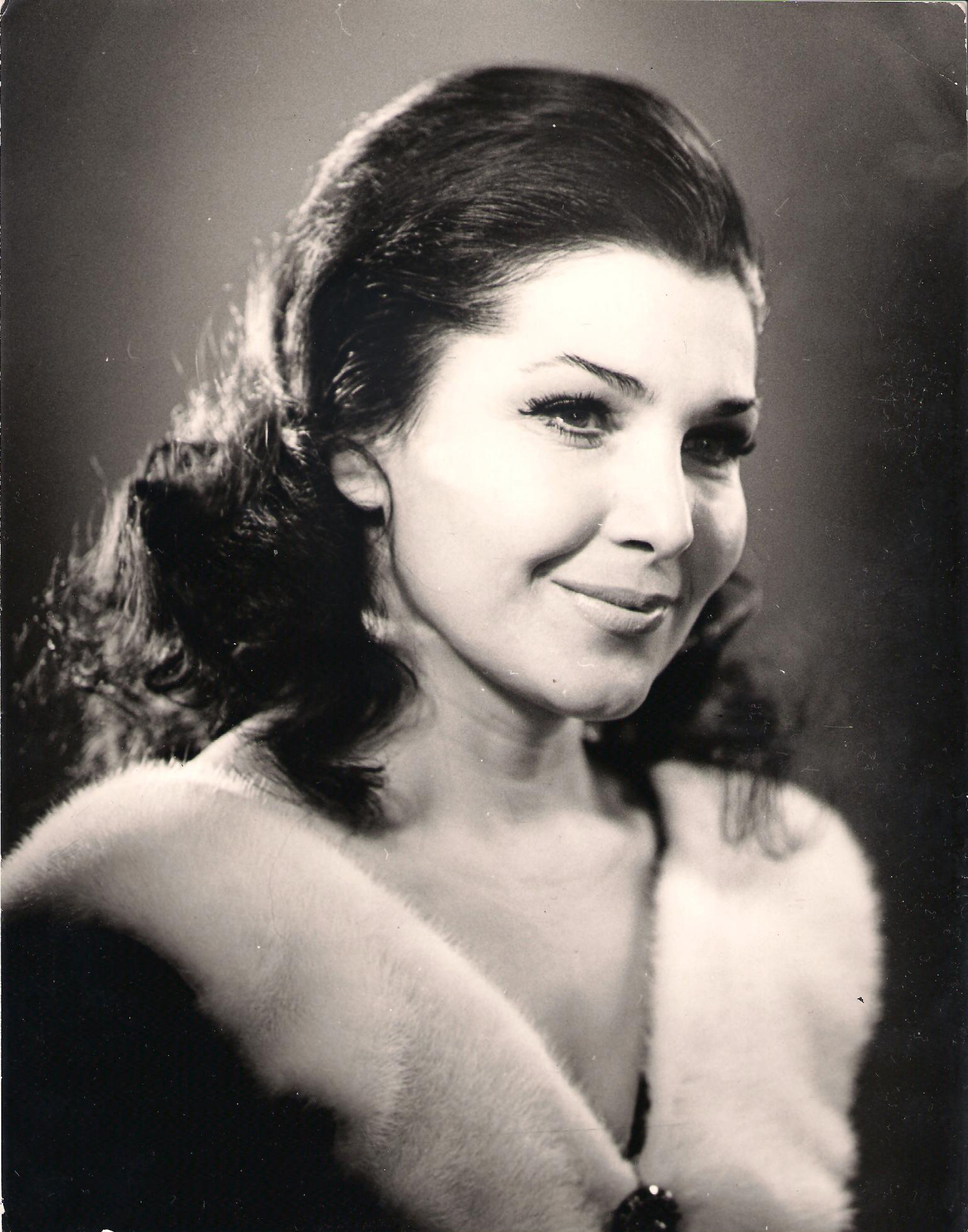
Lamara Chkonia

- Elza Radziņa (1917–2005), theater and film actress
- Aleksey Urgalkin (1910–1981), stage actor
- Dmitriy Aleksidze (1910–1984), theater director
- Isidor Zak (1909–1998), conductor
- Vladimir Atlantov (b. 1939), opera singer (lyric-dramatic tenor)
- Natalia Bessmertnova (1941–2008), ballet dancer
- Alexander Vedernikov (1927–2018), opera singer (bass)
- Vera Dulova (1909–2000), harpist
- Marina Kondratyeva (1934–2024), ballet dancer
- Mikhail Lavrovsky (b. 1941), артист балета, балетмейстер
- Māris Liepa (1936–1989), ballet dancer
- Juri Mazurok (1931–2006), opera singer (baritone)
- Asaf Messerer (1903–1992), ballet dancer, teacher and choreographer
- Yevgeny Nesterenko (1938–2021), opera singer (bass)
- Elena Obraztsova (1939–2015), opera singer (mezzo-soprano)
- Gennady Rozhdestvensky (1931–2018), conductor
- Nikolai Fadeyechev (1933–2020), ballet dancer, teacher
- Arthur Eisen (1927–2008), opera singer (bass)
- Peter Loboda (1907–1979), stage actor
- Gafar Valamat-Zade (1916–1993), ballet dancer, choreographer
- Ivan Avramov (1915–1985), theater actor and director
- Arvīds Jansons (1914–1984), conductor
- Mikhail Vodyanoy (1924–1987), operetta artist, film actor
- Serghei Lunchevici (1934–1995), conductor, violinist, composer
- Oleg Yefremov (1927–2000), theater and film actor and director
- Yury Yakovlev (1928–2013), theater and film actor
- Tamara Alioșina-Alexandrova (1928–1996), opera singer (mezzo-soprano)
- Nikolay Manoylo (1927–1998), opera singer (baritone)
- Anatoliy Mokrenko (1933–2020), opera singer (baritone)
- Nonna Andriivna Surzhina (b. 1937), opera singer (mezzo-soprano)
- Aleksey Batalov (1928–2017), theater and film actor
- Irina Bogacheva (1939–2019), opera singer (mezzo-soprano)
- Sergey Vikulov (b. 1937), ballet dancer, choreographer
- Asankhan Dzhumakhmatov (1923–2008), composer
- Lev Kulidzhanov (1924–2002), film director
- Bulat Minzhilkiev (1940–1997), opera singer (bass)
- Alexander Murin (1917–1992), choral conductor
- Mariya Stepanova (1916–1983), theater and film actress
- Yefim Yulyevich Uchitel (1913–1988), documentary film director and cinematographer
- Lyudmila Erofeeva (1937–2003), opera singer (lyric-coloratura soprano)
- Kārlis Zariņš (1930–2015), singer (dramatic tenor)
- Medea Amiranashvili (1930–2023), opera singer (lyric soprano)
- Azerbaijan Mambetov (1932–2009), theater director
- Lamara Chkonia (1930–2024), opera singer (lyric-coloratura soprano)

=== 1977 ===
- Nijolė Ambrazaitytė (1939–2016), opera singer (mezzo-soprano)
- Svyatlana Danilyuk (1939–2003), opera singer (mezzo-soprano)
- Lutfi Kabirova (1932–2013), opera singer (soprano)
- Tiiu Randviir (b. 1938), ballet dancer
- Yuri Ozerov (1921–2001), film director
- Lutfiyar Imanov (1928–2008), opera singer (dramatic tenor)
- Migran Erkat (1921–1986), opera singer (baritone)
- Nina Sazonova (1917–2004), theater and film actress
- Oleksandr Hai (1914–2000), theater and film actor
- Mikhail Godenko (1919–1991), ballet dancer, choreographer
- Zakir Mukhamedzhanov (1921–2012), theater and film actor
- Grigor Yeghiazaryan (1908–1988), composer
- Vera Ershova (1917–2006), stage actress
- Azat Abbasov (1925–2006), opera singer (lyric tenor)
- Khydyr Allanurov (1922–1993), conductor
- Veronika Dudarova (1916–2009), conductor
- Lyudmila Makarova (1921–2014), stage actress
- Voldemar Panso (1920–1977), theater actor and director, film actor
- Fedir Vereshchahin (1910–1996), theater director
- Andrey Goncharov (1918–2001), theater director, theater teacher
- Şäwkät Biktimeref (1928–2012), stage actor
- Arkadi Iwanowitsch Arkadjew (1907–1993), theater actor and director, film actor
- Aleksandr Stolper (1907–1979), film director, screenwriter
- Konstantin Stepankov (1928–2004), theater and film actor
- Erast Garin (1902–1980), theater actor and director, film actor
- Stefan Turchak (1938–1988), conductor
- Daniil Shafran (1923–1997), cellist
- Dilbar Abdurahmonova (1936–2018), conductor

=== 1978 ===
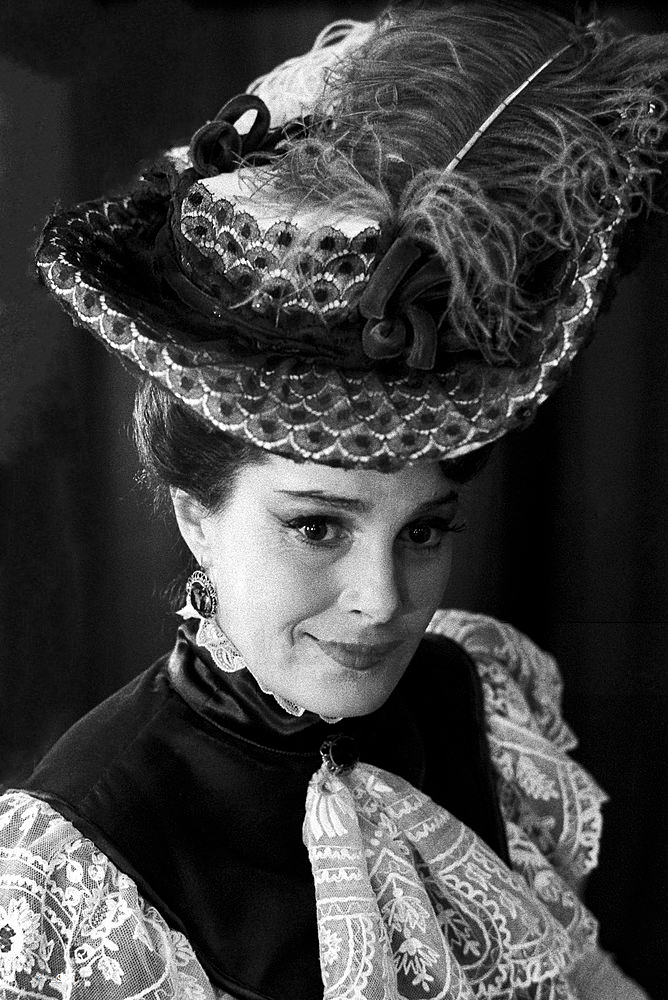
Elina Bystritskaya

- Yevgeny Leonov (1926–1994), theater and film actor
- Yelena Fadeyeva (1914–1999), theater and film actress
- Tatyana Shmyga (1928–2011), operetta artist, film actress
- Vladimir Kurochkin (1922–2002), actor and director of operettas
- Igor Vladimirov (1919–1999), actor and director
- Valery Kovtun (1944–2005), ballet dancer
- Rostislav Yankovsky (1930–2016), theater and film actor
- Olga Bardina (1932–2001), opera singer (lyric-dramatic soprano)
- Yury Popov (1929–2013), opera singer (dramatic baritone)
- Tankho Israilov (1918–1981), ballet dancer, choreographer
- Helmer-Rainer Sinisalo (1920–1989), composer
- Elina Bystritskaya (1928–2019), theater and film actress
- Rufina Nifontova (1931–1994), theater and film actress
- Henrikas Vancevičius (1924–2014), theater director
- Rauf Hajiyev (1922–1995), composer
- Suren Babloev (1918–1979), choral conductor
- Ada Rogovtseva (b. 1937), theater and film actress
- Mykola Kondratyuk (1931–2006), opera and pop singer (baritone)
- Oleg Borisov (1929–1994), theater and film actor
- Hovhannes Chekijyan (b. 1929), choral conductor
- Mikhail Mansurov (1916–1993), stage actor

=== 1979 ===
- Pavel Kadochnikov (1915–1988), theater and film actor and director
- Jurabek Murodov (b. 1942), pop singer (tenor), rubab performer
- Margarita Voites (1936–2024), opera singer (coloratura soprano)
- Dmitriy Zhuravlev (1900–1991), entertainer and performer
- Konstantin Orbelyan (1928–2014), composer and conductor
- Platon Maiboroda (1918–1989), composer
- Aleksandr Medvedkin (1900–1989), film director and screenwriter
- Dmitry Mikhailovich Tsyganov (1903–1992), violinist
- Ramazan Bapov (1947–2014), ballet dancer
- Sergei Plotnikov (1909–1990), theater and film actor
- Tsisana Tatishvili (1937–2017), opera singer (soprano)
- Aleksandra Prokoshina (1918—2005), singer (soprano)
- Edvardas Kaniava (b. 1937), opera singer (baritone)
- Vladimir Volzhansky (1917–1983), circus performer (acrobat, equilibrist)
- Yoldosh Azamov (1909–1985), film director
- Kalyj Moldobasanov (1929–2006), composer and conductor
- Gunārs Cilinskis (1931–1992), theater actor and director, film actor, film director
- Ādolfs Skulte (1909–2000), composer
- Giga Lortkipanidze (1927–2013), theater and film director
- Dmytro Smolych (1919–1987), theater director
- Lev Venediktov (1924–2017), choral conductor
- Yaroslav Antonovich Voshchak (1921–1989), conductor
- Zurab Sotkilava (1937–2017), opera singer (tenor)
- Volodymyr Hrypych (1923–2005), theater director
- Otar Megvinetukhutsesi (1932–2013), theater and film actor

=== 1980 ===
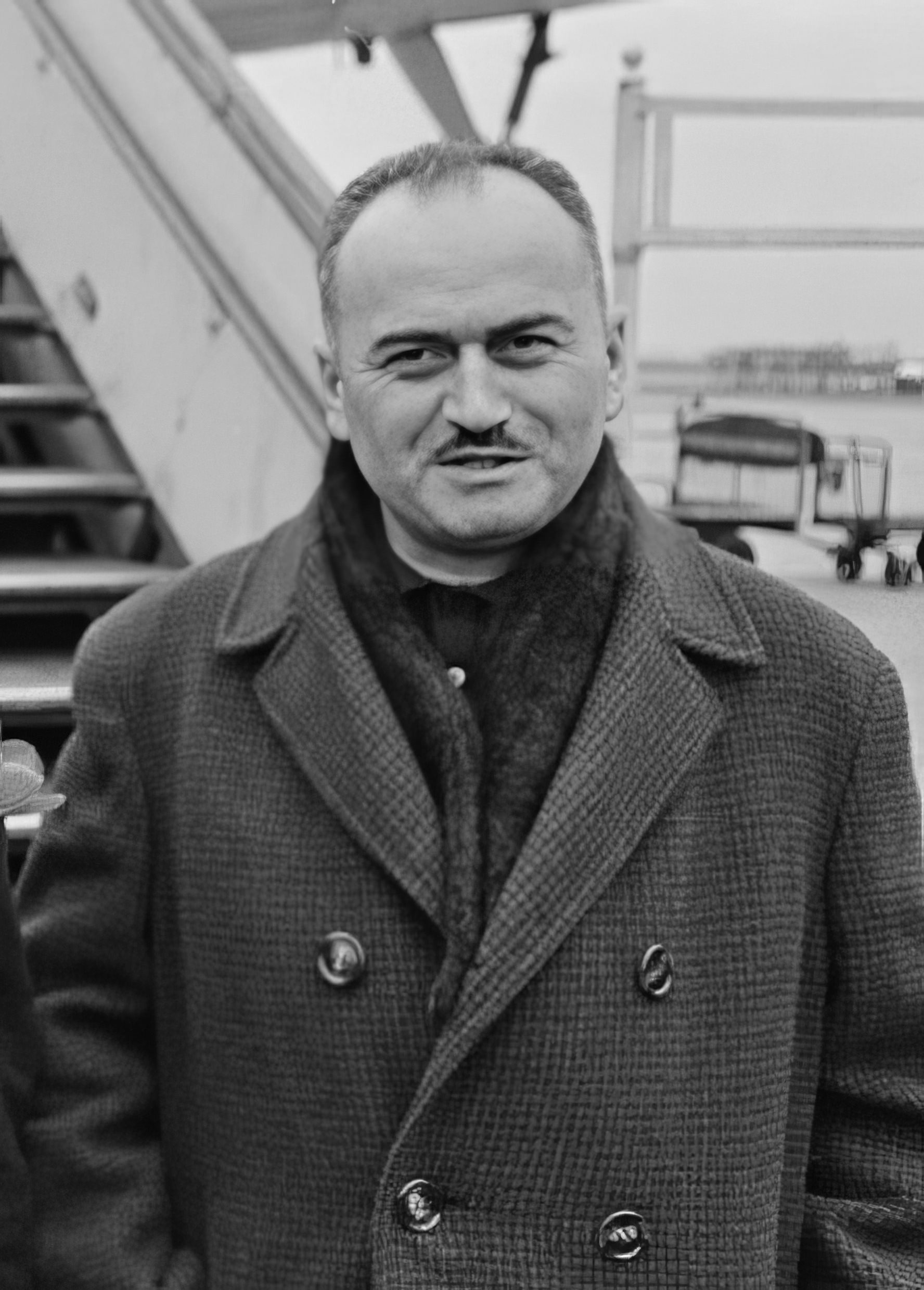
Rezo Chkheidze

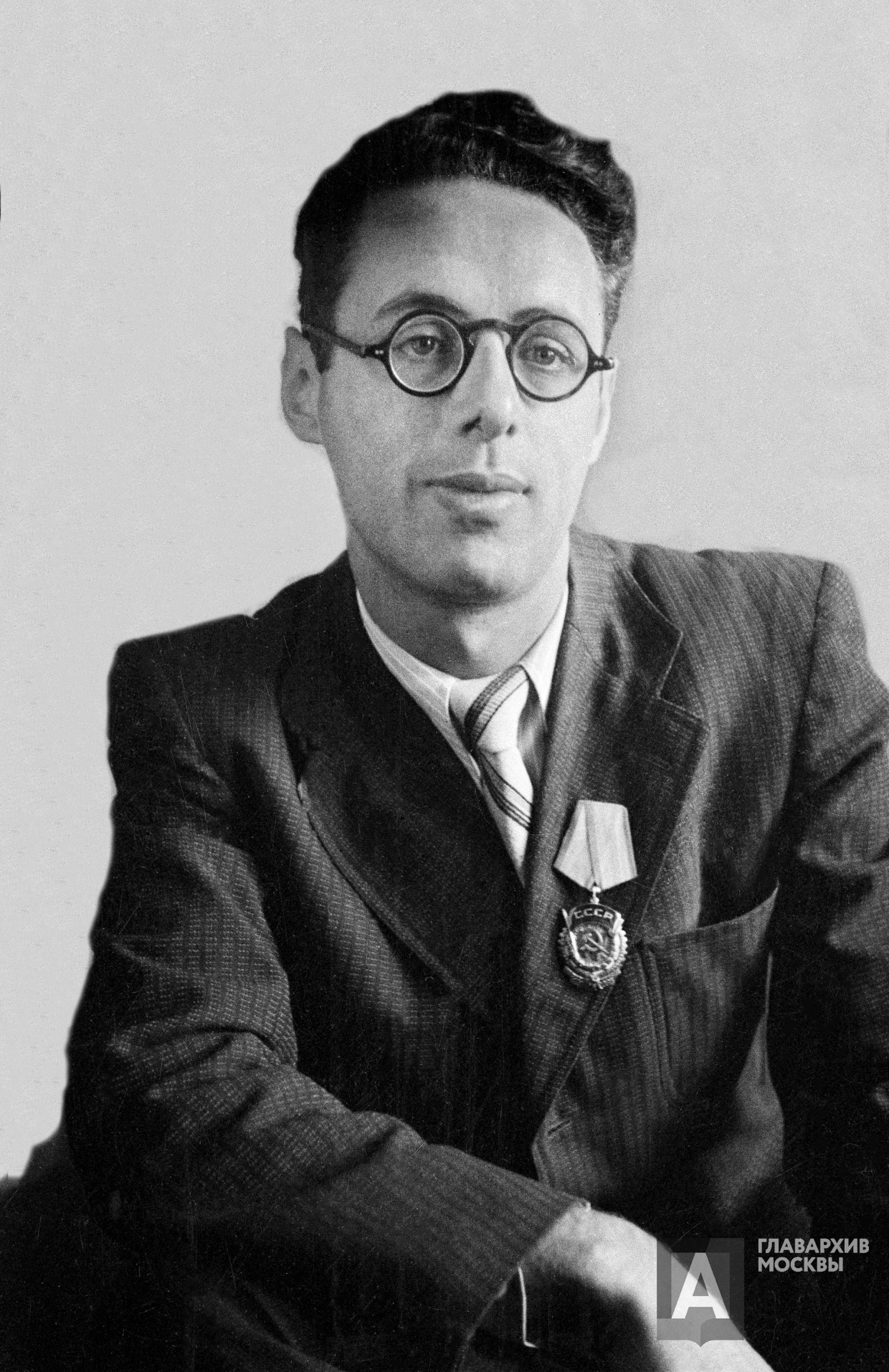
Yuri Levitan

- Eduardas Balsys (1919–1984), composer
- Hendrik Krumm (1934–1989), opera singer (lyric-dramatic tenor)
- Tatyana Alekseevna Tayakina (1951–2023), ballet dancer
- Hakim Zaripov (1924–2023), circus performer (rider), film actor
- Nikolay Olkhovikov (1922–1987), circus performer (rider and juggler)
- Vladimir Oskal-Ool (1920–1999), circus performer (juggler and equilibrist)
- Vasiliy Tretyak (1926–1989), opera singer (tenor)
- Halyna Tuftina (1933–2007), opera singer (mezzo-soprano)
- Georgiy Zhzhonov (1915–2005), theater and film actor
- Ivan Dmitriev (1915–2003), theater and film actor
- Mukhamed Cherkezov (1911–1993), theater and film actor
- Asanali Ashimov (1937—2025), theater and film actor
- Farida Sharipova (1936–2010), actress
- Lidiya Mosolova (1918–1996), stage actress
- Pyotr Monastyrsky (1915–2013), theater director
- Galina Makarova (1919–1993), stage actress
- Ğabdulla Şamukof (1909–1981), actor
- Vera Kuzmina (1923–2021), stage actress
- Nina Meshko (1917–2008), choral conductor
- Zeynab Khanlarova (b. 1936), opera singer (soprano), mugham performer
- Vyacheslav Hrinchenko (1938–1998), opera singer (bass)
- Saulius Sondeckis (1928–2016), conductor
- Vsevolod Yakut (1912–1991), theater and film actor
- Tengiz Abuladze (1924–1994), film director
- Ivan Solovyov (1910–1982), theater and film actor
- Rezo Chkheidze (1926–2015), film director
- Glaphira Sidorova (1922–2019), stage actress
- Andrey Petrov (1930–2006), composer
- Khoren Abrahamyan (1930–2004), theater and film actor, theater director
- Kayyrgül Sartbaeva (b. 1936), opera singer (lyric soprano)
- Vladimir Fedoseyev (b. 1932), conductor
- Olga Vysotskaya (1906–2000), All-Union Radio announcer
- Yuri Levitan (1914–1983), All-Union Radio announcer

=== 1981 ===
- Metaksia Simonyan (1926–1987), stage actress
- Zoya Spirina (1926–1986), actress
- Shuhrat Abbosov (1931–2018), film director and screenwriter
- Nina Isakova (b. 1928), opera singer (mezzo-soprano)
- Alisa Freindlich (b. 1934), theater and film actress
- Yuri Simonov (b. 1941), conductor
- Gaziza Zhubanova (1927–1993), composer
- Erkegali Rakhmadiyev (1932–2013), composer
- Kim Bazarsadaev (1937–2002), opera singer (bass)
- Edvard Mirzoyan (1921–2012), composer
- Grigory Chukhray (1921–2001), film director, screenwriter
- Vladimir Morozov (1933–2002), opera singer (bass)
- Yuri Temirkanov (1938–2023), conductor
- Rihards Glāzups (1920–1993), conductor
- Nikolai Slichenko (1934–2021), actor and director
- Suimenkul Chokmorov (1939–1992), theater and film actor
- Maria Mordasova (1915–1997), singer, folk music performer
- Leo Golovanov (1926–2015), dancer
- Rodion Shchedrin (1932–2025), composer
- Andrei Eshpai (1925–2015), composer
- Yuri Mazhuga (1931–2022), theater and film actor
- Vladimir Curbet (1930–2017), choreographer
- Yuliya Solntseva (1901–1989), film actress, film director
- Murad Kajlayev (1931–2023), composer, conductor
- Aysulu Tokombayeva (b. 1947), ballet dancer
- Boris Tenin (1905–1990), theater and film actor
- Sabira Ataeva (1917–1993), theater and film actress
- Anu Kaal (b. 1940), opera singer (lyric-coloratura soprano)
- Valentina Yermakova (1924–2003), theater and film actress, theater teacher
- Sergey Tikhonov (1921–1992), actor
- Mikheil Tumanishvili (1921–1996), theater director
- Tatiana Doronina (b. 1933), theater actress and director, film actress
- Ramaz Chkhikvadze (1928–2011), theater and film actor
- Pyotr Glebov (1915–2000), theater and film actor
- Lyudmila Chursina (b. 1941), theater and film actress

=== 1982 ===
- Viktor Tarasov (1934–2006), actor
- Sharah Abzagovich Pachalia (1914–2000), theater director, actor, playwright
- Mikhail Chubinidze (1910–2006), theater and film actor
- Sholpan Zhandarbekova (1922–2005), stage actress
- Aleksandrs Lembergs (1921–1985), choreographer
- Idris Nogajbayev (1931–1989), stage actor
- Nikolay Levitsky (1911–1982), popular science film director
- Arutyun Akopyan (1918–2005), stage artist, illusionist
- Valentina Leontyeva (1923–2007), TV presenter, television announcer
- Tamara Sinyavskaya (b. 1943), singer (mezzo-soprano)
- Cholponbek Bazarbaev (1949–2002), ballet dancer
- Ivan Lapikov (1922–1993), theater and film actor
- Zagir Ismagilov (1917–2003), composer
- Henrik Malyan (1925–1988), film director, screenwriter
- Yevgeny Raikov (1937–2010), opera singer (lyric-dramatic tenor)
- Vladimir Kenigson (1907–1986), theater and film actor
- Nina Mamayeva (1923–2001), stage actress
- Irakly Andronikov (1908–1990), writer, spoken word artist
- Vladimir Andrianov (1906–1985), stage actor
- Robert Sturua (b. 1938), theater director
- Rem Lebedev (1928–1988), theater and film artist

=== 1983 ===
- Aleksandr Alov (1923–1983), film director, screenwriter
- Vladimir Naumov (1927–2021), film director
- Ruben Agamirzian (1922–1991), theater director
- Anatoly Avdievsky (1933–2016), choral conductor
- Yevgeny Yevstigneyev (1926–1992), theater and film actor
- Tatiana Nikolayeva (1924–1993), pianist, composer
- Arvīds Žilinskis (1905–1993), composer
- Frunze Dovlatyan (1927–1997), film director, film actor
- Vladislav Piavko (1941–2020), opera singer (tenor)
- Nikita Bogoslovsky (1913–2004), composer
- Anatoly Kotcherga (b. 1947), opera singer (bass)
- Baudordzhi Yampilov (1916–1989), composer
- Gabriela Komleva (р. 1938), ballet dancer and choreographer
- Askold Makarov (1925–2000), ballet dancer and choreographer
- Olga Moiseyeva (1928–2021), ballet dancer and choreographer
- Nikolay Okhotnikov (1937–2017), singer (bass)
- Vladilen Semionov (b. 1932), ballet dancer and choreographer
- Alla Sizova (1939–2014), ballet dancer
- Ludmila Filatova (b. 1935), opera singer (mezzo-soprano)
- Oleg Vinogradov (b. 1937), choreographer
- Lyudmila Gurchenko (1935–2011), theater and film actress, pop singer
- Vladimir Basov (1923–1987), film director, actor
- Nani Bregvadze (b. 1938), pop singer
- Mikhail Gluzsky (1918–2001), theater and film actor
- Valery Egudin (1937–2007), opera singer (tenor)

=== 1984 ===
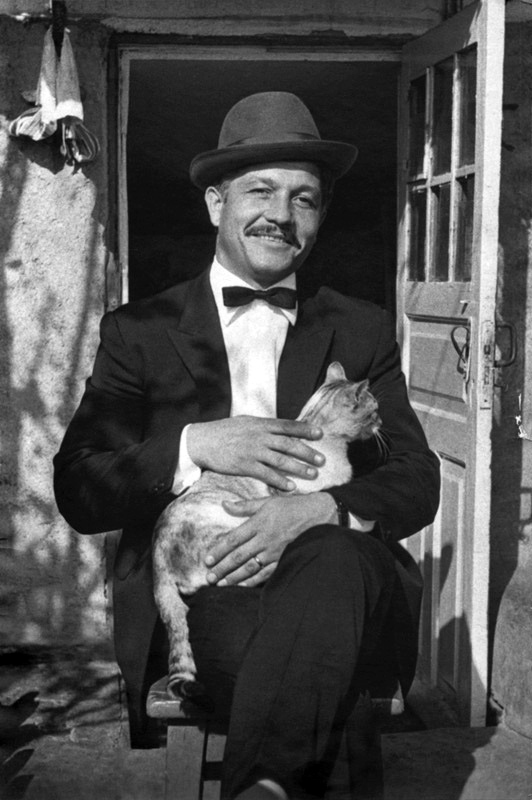
Mihai Volontir

- Malika Kalontarova (b. 1950), ballet dancer
- Frunzik Mkrtchyan (1930–1993), theater and film actor
- Evgeniy Glebov (1929–2000), composer
- Nurgisa Tlendiyev (1925–1998), conductor, composer
- Mihai Volontir (1934–2015), theater and film artist
- Viktor Korshunov (1929–2015), theater and film actor
- Aleksandra Pakhmutova (b. 1929), composer
- Serafim Tulikov (1914–2004), composer
- Eldar Ryazanov (1927–2015), film director
- Vladimir Etush (1922–2019), theater and film actor, theater teacher
- Marsil Sälimcanof (1934–2002), theater director
- Vladimir Samoilov (1924–1999), theater and film actor
- Kunduz Mirkarimova (1925–2019), ballet director-choreographer
- Alexander Kholminov (1925–2015), composer
- Tatyana Lioznova (1924–2011), film director
- Ioakim Sharoev (1930–2000), theater director and teacher
- Aleksey Chyrgal-ool (1924–1989), composer
- Nikolay Salamov (1922–2003), actor
- Svetlana Adyrkhaeva (1938–2023), ballet dancer
- Oleg Basilashvili (b. 1934), theater and film actor
- Vyacheslav Gordeyev (b. 1948), ballet dancer, choreographer
- Dmitri Kitayenko (b. 1940), conductor
- Nadezhda Pavlova (b. 1956), ballet dancer
- Khuseyn Mukhtarov (1938–2001), opera singer (bass)
- Toktonali Seytaliev (1937–2021), opera singer (lyric tenor)

=== 1985 ===
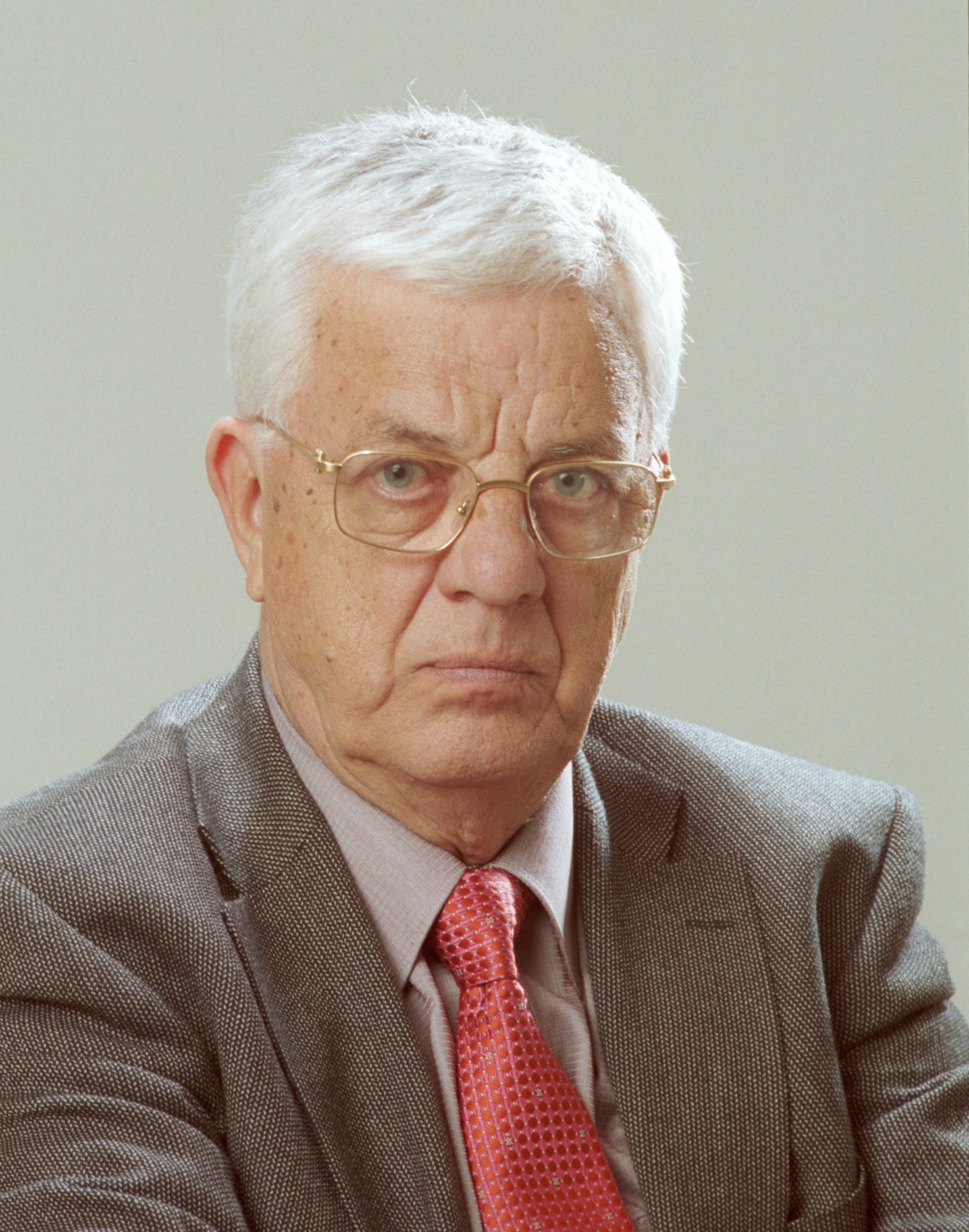
Raimonds Pauls

- Shamgon Sagaddinovich Kazhigaliyev (1927–2015), conductor
- Nikolai Mikheyev (1923–1993), stage actor
- Raimonds Pauls (b. 1936), composer
- Leonid Markov (1927–1991), theater and film actor
- Armen Dzhigarkhanyan (1935–2020), theater and film actor
- Yuri Bogatikov (1932–2002), pop singer (baritone)
- Baba Annanov (1934–1991), theater director, actor
- Mikhail Bushnov (1923–2014), theater actor
- Valentin Elizariev (b. 1947), choreographer
- Arkadij Sawczenko (1936–2004), opera singer (baritone)
- Konstantin Adashevsky (1897–1987), theater and film actor
- Aleksandr Ivanovich Shchegolev (1913–1988), stage actor
- Sos Sargsyan (1929–2013), theater and film actor
- Regimantas Adomaitis (1937–2022), theater and film actor
- Maria Stefiuk (b. 1948), opera singer (lyric-coloratura soprano)
- Valentin Levashov (1915–1994), composer, choir conductor
- Yuri Ivanovich Kazakov (1924–2019), accordionist
- Inna Makarova (1926–2020), film actress
- Jansug Kakhidze (1936–2002), conductor
- Tolomush Okeyev (1935–2001), film director
- Ivan Ivanov-Vano (1900–1987), animation director
- Davletbay Khodzhabayev (1931–2019), circus performer, horse rider
- Boris Tchaikovsky (1925–1996), composer
- Vladimir Andreyev (1930–2020), theater and film actor
- Klara Luchko (1925–2005), theater and film actress
- Igor Shapovalov (b. 1945), ballet dancer, choreographer
- Mark Fradkin (1914–1990), composer
- Vasily Lanovoy (1934–2021), theater and film actor

=== 1986 ===
- Imants Kokars (1921–2011), choral conductor
- Dugarzhap Dashiev (1939–2003), opera singer (lyric-dramatic tenor)
- Marlen Khutsiev (1925–2019), film director
- Georgy Pantyukov (1922–1994), choral conductor
- Vera Vasilyeva (1925–2023), theater and film actress
- Georgy Ansimov (1922–2015), director of operas and operettas
- Vyacheslav Nevinny (1934–2009), theater and film actor
- Eri Klas (1939–2016), conductor
- Edgar Hovhannisyan (1930–1998), composer
- Viktor Turov (1936–1996), film director
- Mihai Muntean (b. 1943), opera singer (lyric-dramatic tenor)
- Röstäm Yaxin (1921–1993), composer, pianist
- Alibek Dnishev (b. 1951), opera singer (lyric tenor)
- Margarita Drozdova (b. 1948), ballet dancer
- Ludmila Semenyaka (b. 1952), ballet dancer and teacher
- Vaclovas Daunoras (1937–2020), opera singer (bass)
- Makvala Kasrashvili (b. 1942), singer (lyric-dramatic soprano)
- Juozas Domarkas (b. 1936), conductor
- Arif Məlikov (1933–2019), composer
- Nikolai Kutuzov (1926–2011), composer, conductor
- Lyudmila Sakharova (1926–2012), ballet dancer, teacher
- Zebo Aminzoda (b. 1948), choreographer
- Vera Baeva (b. 1936), singer (lyric-coloratura soprano)

=== 1987 ===
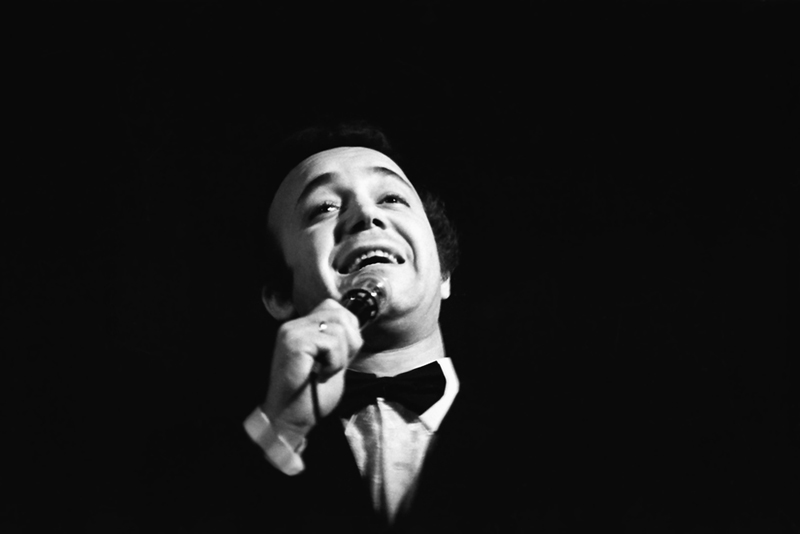
Joseph Kobzon

- Anna Pokidchenko (1926–2014), actress
- Quddus Khojamyarov (1918–1994), composer
- Eugen Doga (1937—2025), composer
- Veljo Tormis (1930–2017), composer
- Veronica Garștea (1927–2012), choral conductor
- Fyodor Khitruk (1917–2012), film director-animator
- Leonid Bronevoy (1928–2017), theater and film actor
- Igor Luchenok (1938–2018), composer
- Maya-Gozel Aimedova (b. 1941), theater and film actress
- Yuri Vladimirov (1942–2025), ballet dancer and teacher
- Nina Sorokina (1942–2011), ballet dancer
- Yevgeniya Khanayeva (1921–1987), theater and film actress
- Viktor Tretiakov (b. 1946), violinist
- Joseph Kobzon (1937–2018), pop singer (baritone)
- Leonid Smetannikov (b. 1943), opera singer (baritone), teacher

=== 1988 ===
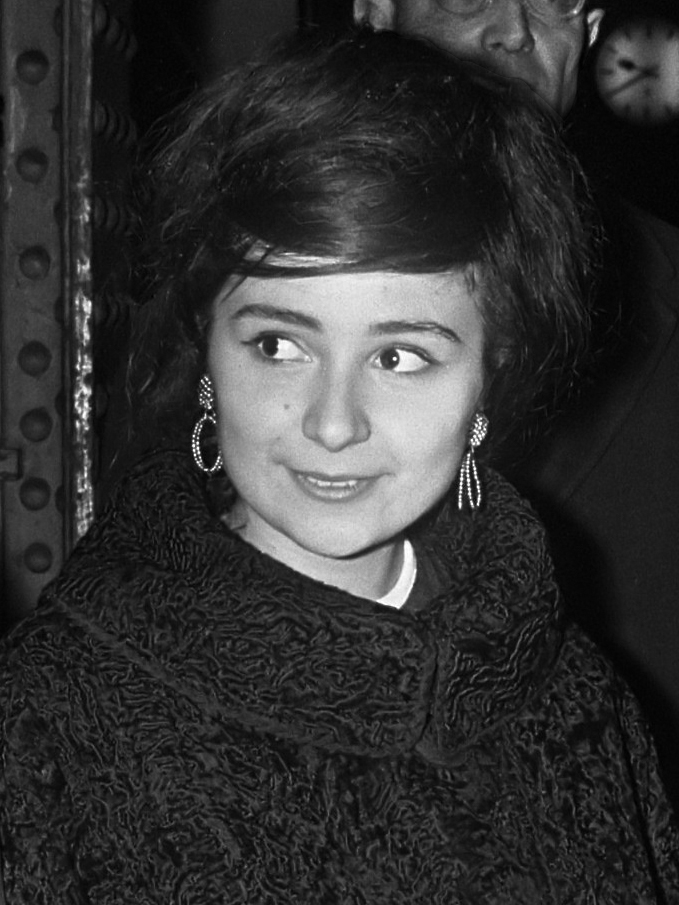
Liana Isakadze

- Oleg Tabakov (1935–2018), theater and film actor, director, theater teacher
- Yury Solomin (1935–2024), theater and film actor and director
- Valentina Kovel (1923–1997), theater and film actress
- Sulkhan Tsintsadze (1925–1991), composer
- Volodymyr Shevchenko (1946–2012), circus performer
- Lyudmyla Shevchenko (b. 1945), circus performer
- Igor Talankin (1927–2010), film director
- Nikolai Nekrasov (1932–2012), folk music conductor
- Giya Kancheli (1935–2019), composer
- Harijs Liepins (1927–1998), theater artist
- Stefaniya Stanyuta (1905–2000), theater and film actress
- Estebes Tursunaliev (1931–2005), akyn-improviser
- Arnold Katz (1924–2007), conductor
- Sofia Rotaru (b. 1947), pop singer
- Khashim Gadoyev (b. 1937), stage actor
- Anatoliy Molodov (1929–2017), choral conductor
- Fidan Gasimova (b. 1948), opera singer (soprano)
- Varduhi Varderesyan (1928–2015), theater and film actress
- Anegina Ilina-Dmitrieva (b. 1943), opera singer (mezzo-soprano)
- Igor Kirillov (1932–2021), TV presenter
- Eldar Shengelaia (1933–2025), film director
- Mikhail Pugovkin (1923–2008), theater and film actor
- Oleg Strizhenov (1929–2025), theater and film actor
- Serhii Danchenko (1937–2001), theater director
- Vladimir Minin (b. 1929), choral conductor
- Edita Piekha (b. 1937), pop singer
- Lev Raskatov (1927–1993), stage actor
- Uldis Žagata (1928–2015), ballet dancer, choreographer
- Liana Isakadze (1946–2024), violinist, conductor
- Sergey Kolosov (1921–2012), film director, screenwriter
- Nikita Dolgushin (1938–2012), ballet dancer, choreographer
- Gizela Tsypola (b. 1944), opera singer (soprano)
- Lyudmila Yermakova (1927–2008), choral conductor

=== 1989 ===
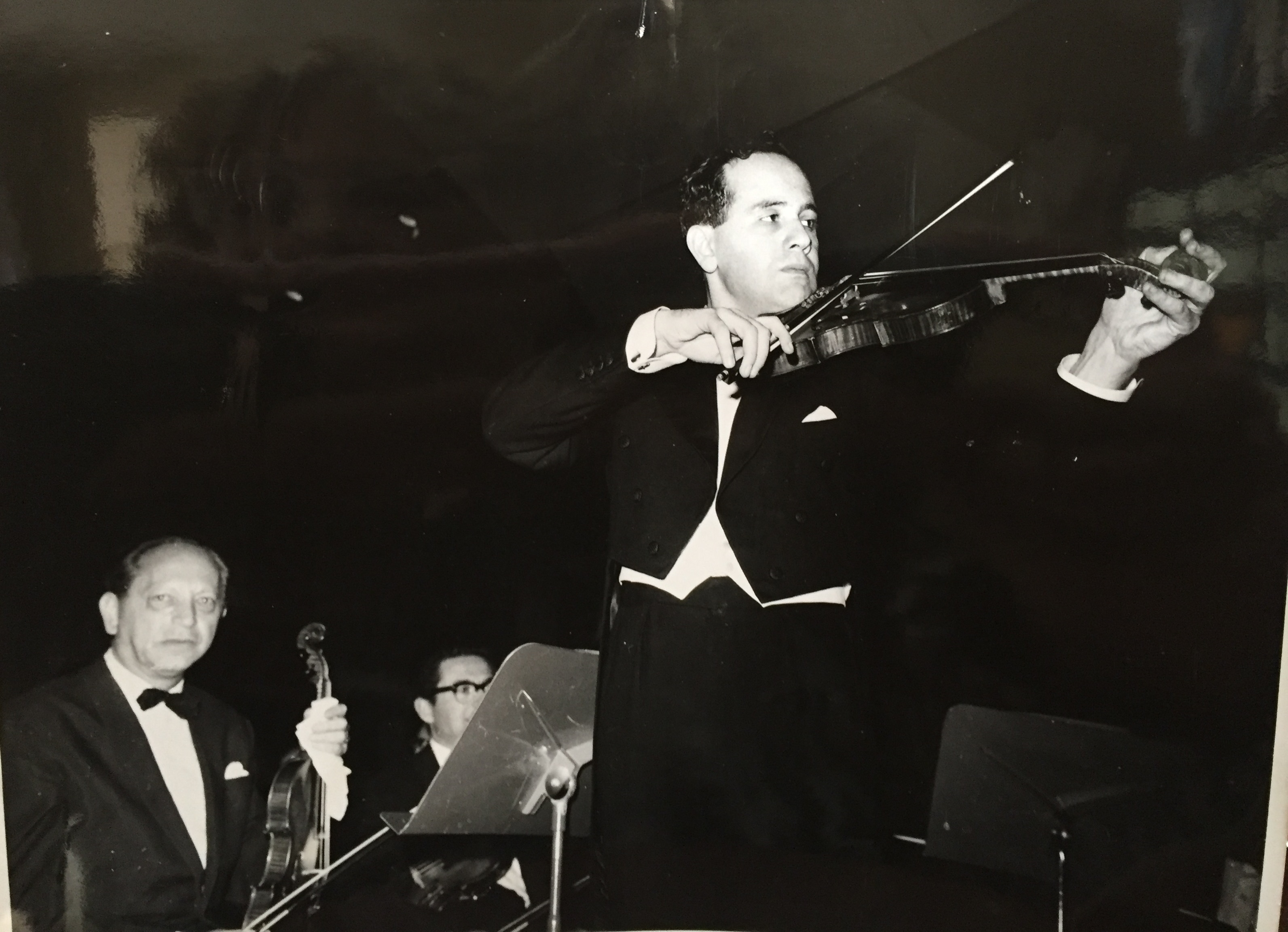
Igor Oistrakh

- Yevgeny Malinin (1930–2001), pianist
- Nikolai Rakov (1908–1990), composer
- Nikolai Yeremenko Sr. (1926–2000), film actor
- Eliso Virsaladze (b 1942), pianist
- Vladimir Doveyko (1922–2002), circus performer, acrobat
- Natalya Durova (1934–2007), circus performer (tamer)
- Yuri Yermolayev (1932–2017), circus performer (horse trainer, rider)
- Irbek Kantemirov (1928–2000), circus performer (horse rider)
- Valery Klimov (1931–2022), violinist
- Pavel Necheporenko (1916–2009), musician (balalaika player), teacher
- Igor Oistrakh (1931–2021), violinist
- Nicolae Sulac (1936–2003), singer
- Samarbubu Toktakunova (b. 1944), musician-instrumentalist
- Yan Frenkel (1920–1989), composer
- Boris Akimov (b. 1946), ballet dancer
- Leonid Gaidai (1923–1993), film director
- Yevgeny Vesnik (1923–2009), theater and film actor
- Galina Volchek (1933–2019), theater director and actress
- Georgiy Daneliya (1930–2019), film director and screenwriter
- Zita Dreiere (Errs) (b. 1952), ballet dancer
- Mira Koltsova (1938–2022), dancer, choreographer
- Leonid Yasinovskiy (1923–2003), stage actor
- Leonid Gubanov (1928–2004), actor of the Moscow Art Theater
- Victor Popov (1934–2008), choral conductor
- Ilya Frez (1909–1994), film director

=== 1990 ===
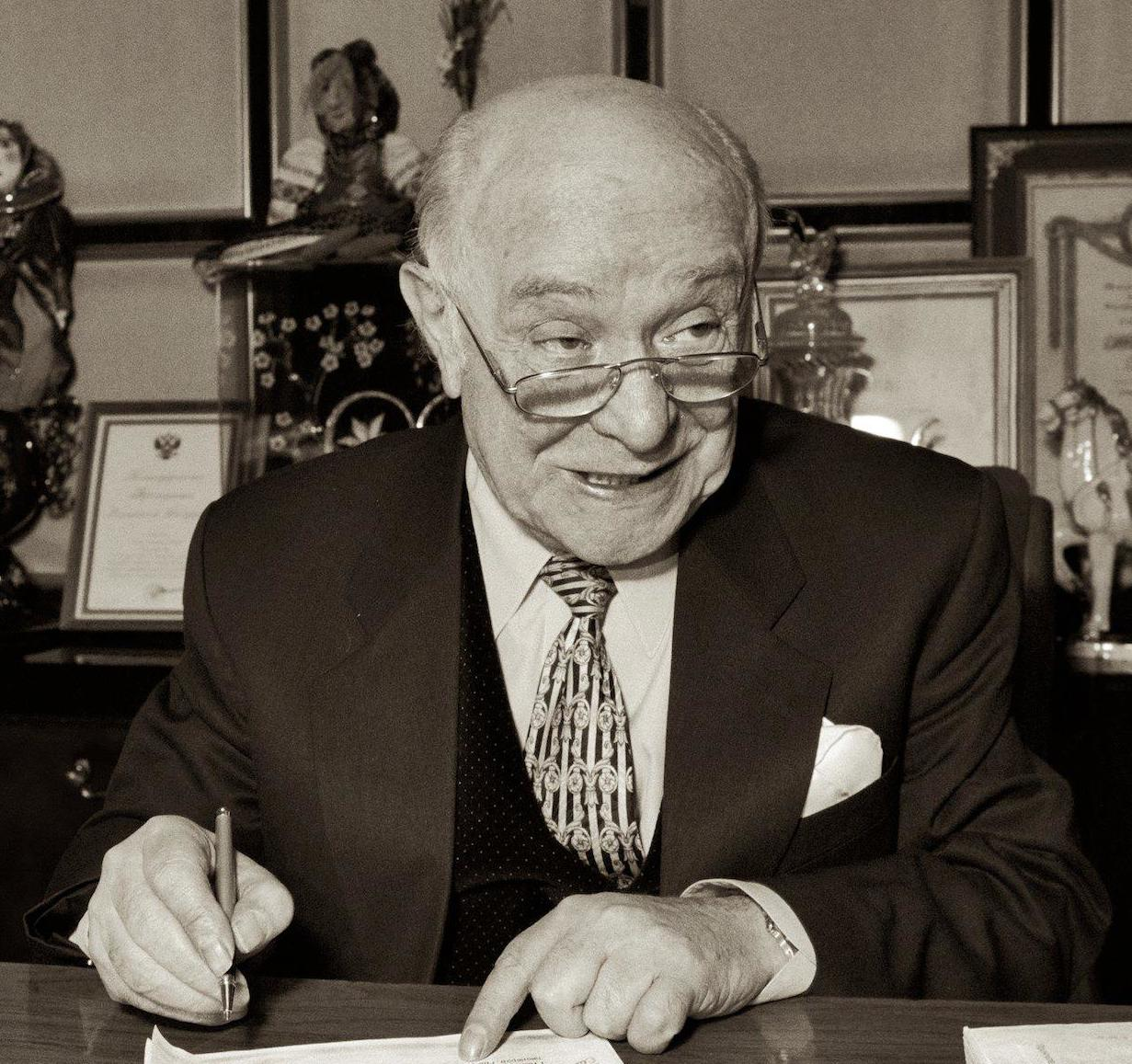
Rolan Bykov

- Ville Golovko (1932–2015) — artistic director (chief director) of the variety and circus studio "Sintez"
- Mikk Mikiver (1937–2006) — stage actor, director, film actor
- Lev Durov (1931–2015), theatre director
- Vladimir Spivakov (b. 1944), violinist and conductor
- Sydyk Mukhamedzhanov (1924–1991), composer
- Mstislav Zapashny (1938–2016), circus artist, animal trainer, director
- Iya Savvina (1936–2011) — stage actress
- Mikhail Schweitzer (1920–2000) — film director
- Vladimir Krainev (1944–2011) — pianist
- Nina Dorliak (1908–1998) — chamber singer (soprano)
- Oleksandr Bilash (1931–2003), composer
- Rolan Bykov (1929–1998) — theater and film actor, film director
- Zinovy Gerdt (1916–1996), theater and film actor
- Gyulli Mubaryakova (1936–2019) — theatre artist
- Leonid Boldin (1931–2013), opera singer
- Aleksandr Dmitriyev (b. 1935) — conductor
- Tatyana Karpova (1916–2018), stage actress
- Ivan Bobylyov (1925–2014), actor, theater director, teacher
- Grigory Ponomarenko (1921–1996) — composer
- Viktar Roŭda (1921–2007), choral conductor, teacher
- Lidiya Sukharevskaya (1909–1991), stage actress
- Georgiy Vitsin (1917–2001), theater and film actor
- Lyubov Sokolova (1921–2001), film actress
- Farhad Badalbeyli (b. 1947), pianist and teacher
- Vladislav Mikosha (1909–2004), cinematographer and film director
- Victor Merzhanov (1919–2012) — pianist and teacher
- Galina Shoydagbaeva (b. 1953), opera singer
- Nikolay Trofimov (1920–2005), stage actor
- Zara Dolukhanova (1918–2007), opera singer (coloratura mezzo-soprano), teacher

=== 1991 ===
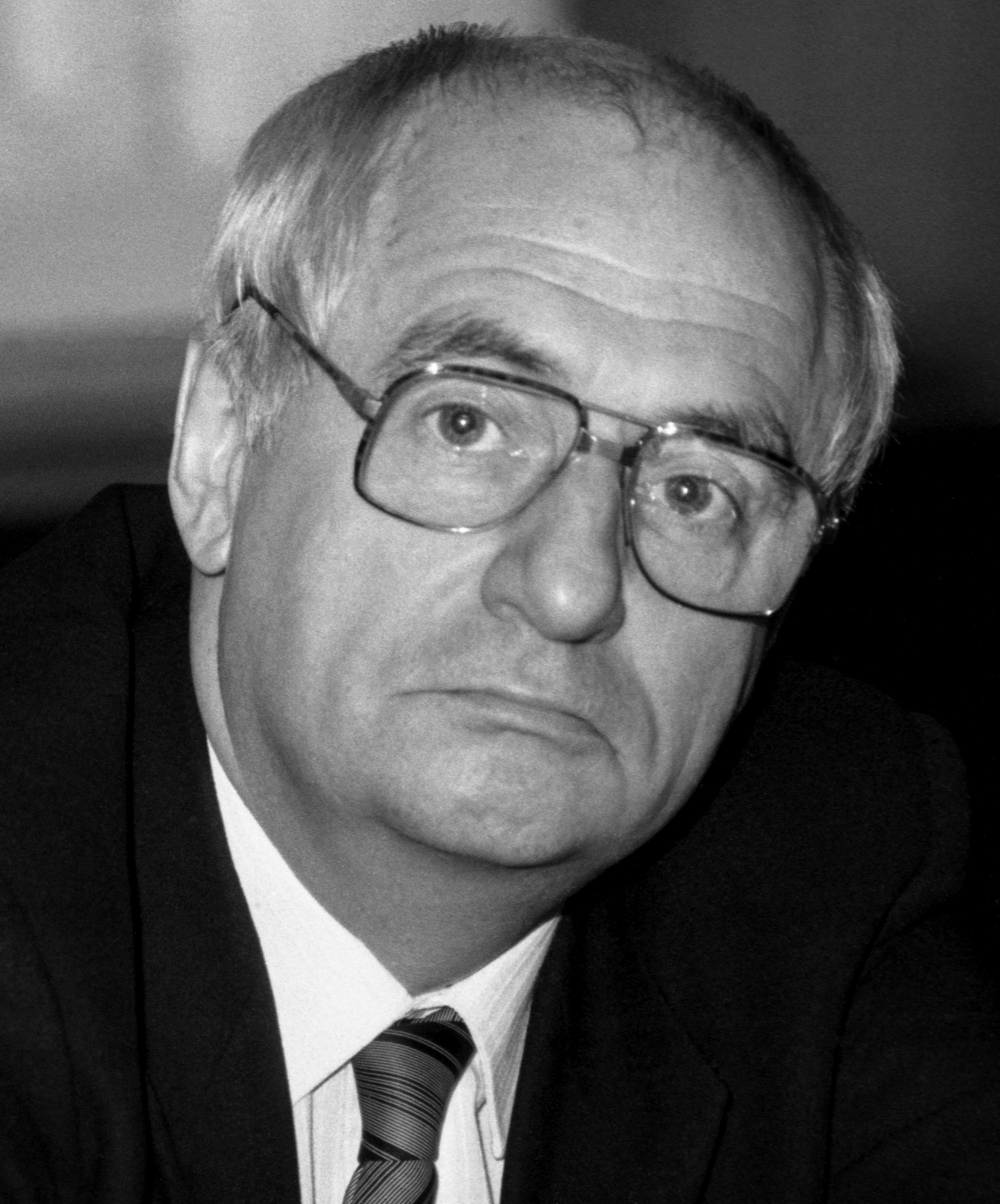
Mark Zakharov

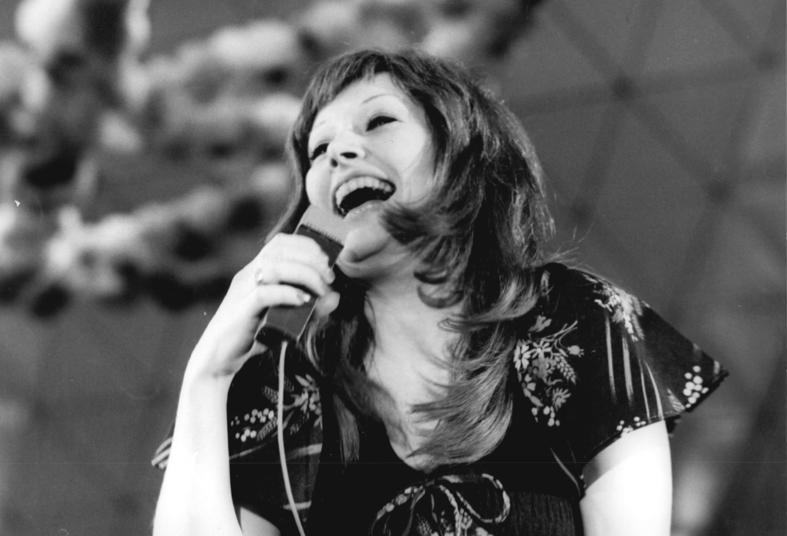
Alla Pugacheva

- Nikolai Arnoldovich Petrov (1943–2011), pianist
- Vladimir Mulyavin (1941–2003), pop singer (dramatic tenor), guitarist, composer, leader of the band Pesniary
- Stepan Oleksenko (1941–2006), stage actor
- Bohdan Stupka (1941–2012), theatre and film actor
- Maria Vladimirovna Mironova (1911–1997), theater and film actress
- Lyudmila Shaposhnikova (1921–2003), theater and film actress
- Yuri Bashmet (b. 1953), violist and conductor
- Mark Zakharov (1933–2019), theater and film director
- Larisa Shevchenko (b. 1950), opera singer (soprano)
- Samson Samsonov (1921–2002), film director
- Mykola Kolessa (1903–2006), composer and conductor
- Eduard Kolmanovsky (1923–1994), composer
- Inna Churikova (1943–2023), theater and film actress
- Mikhail Zimin (1930–1991), theatre and film actor
- Natalia Gutman (b. 1942), cellist
- Ghazaros Saryan (1920–1998), composer
- Bolotbek Shamshiyev (1941–2019), film director
- Yoqub Ahmedov (1938—2025), theater and film artist
- Eduard Grach (b. 1930), violinist
- Ajdar Ibrahimov (1919–1993), film director
- Vladislav Chernushenko (1936—2026), choir conductor and teacher
- Lev Vlassenko (1928–1996), pianist
- Ashir Kuliev (1918–2000), composer
- Kapar Medetbekov (1931–2012), theater and film artist
- Gennady Ovsyannikov (b. 1935), actor
- Anatoly Poletaev (b. 1936), accordionist, conductor
- Alla Pugacheva (b. 1949), pop singer
- Avet Terterian (1929–1994), composer
- Natalia Shakhovskaya (1935–2017), cellist
- Valeriy Yakovlev (1939—2024), theater director
- Sofiya Pilyavskaya (1911–2000), theater and film actress
- Oleg Yankovsky (1944–2009), theater and film actor

== Visual arts (Narodny khudozhnik) ==
=== 1943 ===
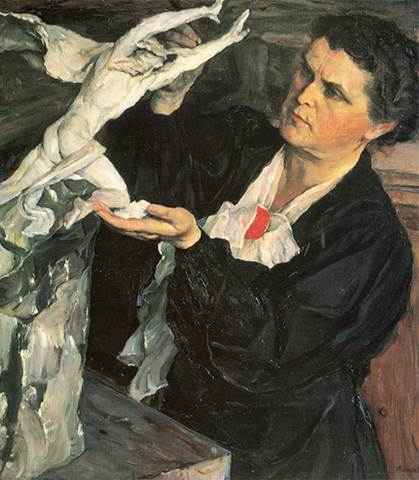
Vera Mukhina, painting by Mikhail Nesterov

- Aleksandr Gerasimov (1881–1963), painter
- Boris Ioganson (1893–1973), artist and pedagogue
- Sergey Merkurov (1881–1952), sculptor
- Vera Mukhina (1889–1953), sculptor

=== 1944 ===
- Vasyl Kasiian (1896–1976), graphic artist
- Anatol Petrytsky (1895–1964), painter
- Oleksii Shovkunenko (1884–1974), painter

=== 1950 ===
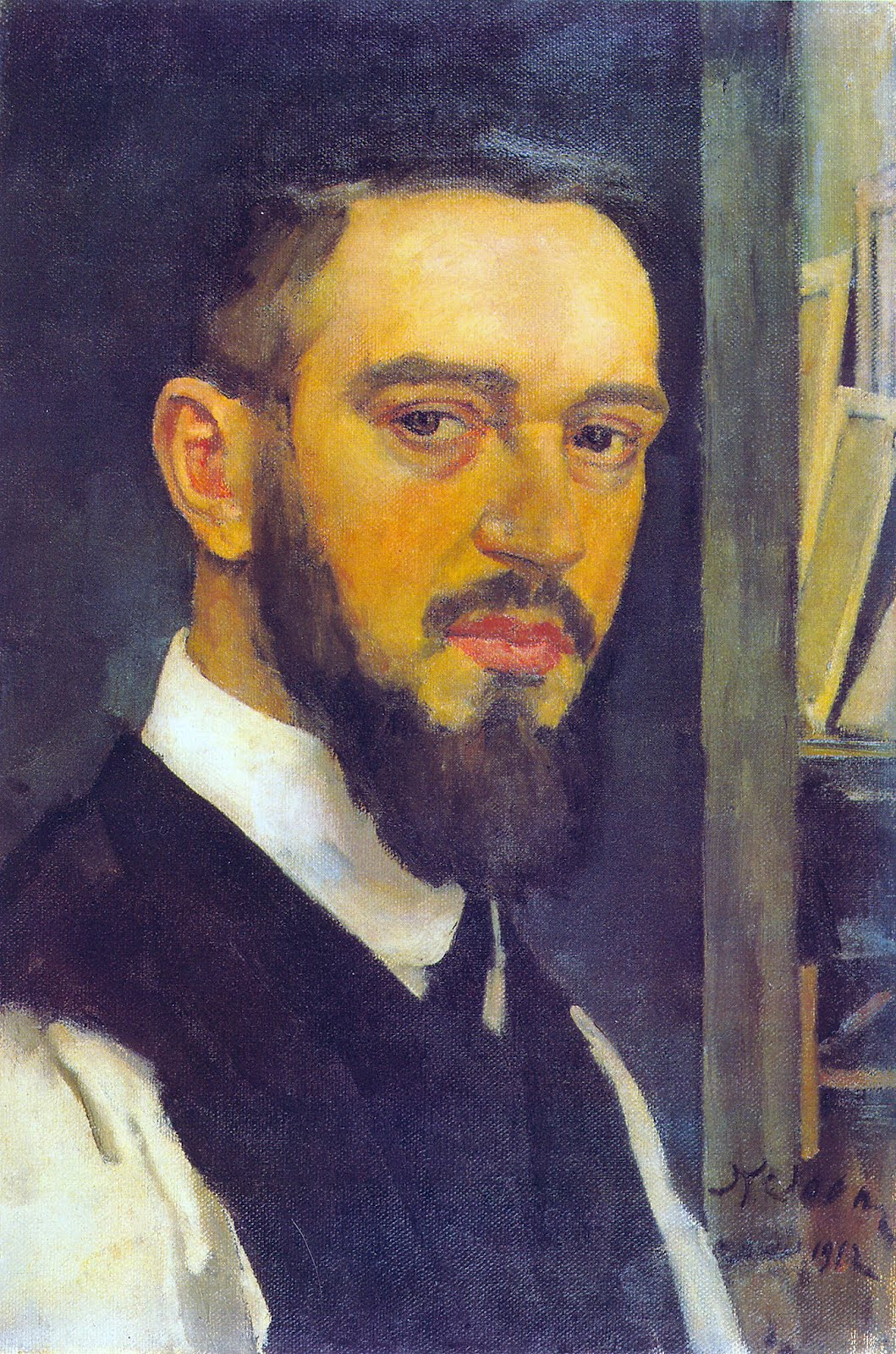
Konstantin Yuon, Self-portrait

- Konstantin Yuon (1875–1958), painter, art theorist

=== 1951 ===
- Fyodor Fedorovsky (1883–1955), stage designer

=== 1953 ===
- Moisey Toidze (1871–1953), painter

=== 1956 ===
- Vasily Baksheyev (1862–1958), painter
- Igor Grabar (1871–1960), artist, art critic, educator, restorer

=== 1957 ===
- Teodors Zaļkalns (1876–1972), sculptor
- Antanas Žmuidzinavičius (1876–1966), painter
- Vsevolod Vsevolodovich Lishev (1877–1960), sculptor

=== 1958 ===
- Sergey Konenkov (1874–1971), sculptor
- Sergey Vasilyevich Gerasimov (1885–1964), painter
- Porfiry Nikitich Krylov (1902–1990), painter and graphic artist
- Mikhail Kupriyanov (1903–1991), painter and graphic artist
- Nikolai Sokolov (1903–2000), graphic artist and painter
- Vladimir Aleksandrovich Serov (1910–1968), painter and graphic artist, teacher
- Matvey Manizer (1891–1966), sculptor

=== 1959 ===
- Yevgeny Vuchetich (1908–1974), sculptor

=== 1960 ===
- Martiros Saryan (1880–1972), landscape painter, graphic artist and stage designer
- Nikolai Tomsky (1900–1984), sculptor

=== 1961 ===
- Juozas Mikėnas (1901–1964), sculptor

=== 1962 ===
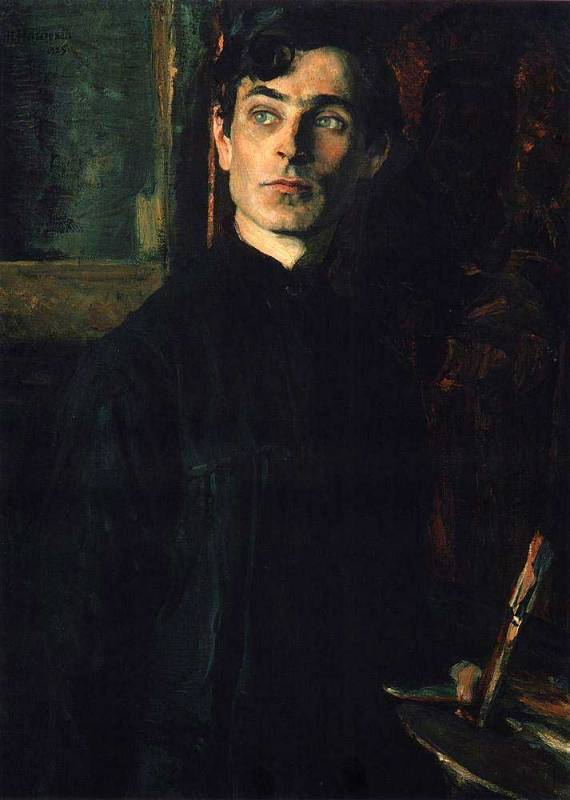
Pavel Korin, painting by Mikhail Nesterov

- Vadim Fedorovič Ryndin (1902–1974), stage designer
- Arkady Plastov (1893–1972), painter
- Pavel Korin (1892–1967), painter

=== 1963 ===
- Mikayil Abdullayev (1921–2002), painter and graphic artist
- Mikhail Anikushin (1917–1997), sculptor
- Yekaterina Fyodorovna Belashova (1906–1971), sculptor
- Ilya Bogdesko (1923–2010), graphic artist
- Mykhailo Bozhy (1911–1990), painter
- Yosyp Bokshay (1891–1975), painter
- Aleksandr Deyneka (1899–1969), painter, graphic artist and sculptor
- Mykhailo Derehus (1904–1997), graphic artist and painter
- Ucha Japaridze (1906–1988), painter, graphic artist
- Nikolay Nikolayevich Zhukov (1908–1973), painter, graphic artist, poster artist
- Alexander Kibalnikov (1912–1987), sculptor
- Mykhailo Lysenko (1906–1972), sculptor
- Evald Okas (1915–2011), painter and teacher
- Ara Sargsyan (1902–1969), sculptor
- Leo Svemps (1897–1975), painter, teacher
- Ural Tansykbayev (1904–1974), painter
- Vladimir Favorsky (1886–1964), graphic artist, woodcut illustrator, painter, art critic, muralist
- Semyon Afanasyevich Chuikov (1902–1980), painter
- Vytautas Jurkūnas (1910–1993), graphic artist

=== 1965 ===
- Boris Volkov (1900–1970), stage designer
- Vasily Yefanov (1900–1978), painter
- Jonas Kuzminskis (1906–1985), graphic artist
- Yuri Neprintsev (1909–1996), painter, graphic artist
- Yakov Romas (1902–1969), painter and teacher
- Fedir Nirod (1907–1996), stage designer

=== 1967 ===
- Dementy Shmarinov (1907–1999), graphic artist and draftsman
- Boris Yefimov (1900–2008), graphic artist, master of political caricature
- Anatoliy Arefyev (1918–1989), stage designer
- Yevgeny Kibrik (1906–1978), painter and graphic artist, illustrator, teacher

=== 1969 ===
- Veniamin Pinchuk (1908–1987), sculptor
- Dmitry Nalbandyan (1906–1993), painter
- Günther Reindorff (1889–1974), graphic artist, book illustrator
- Yevgeni Yenej (1890–1971), production designer
- Victor Oreshnikov (1904–1987), painter and teacher

=== 1970 ===
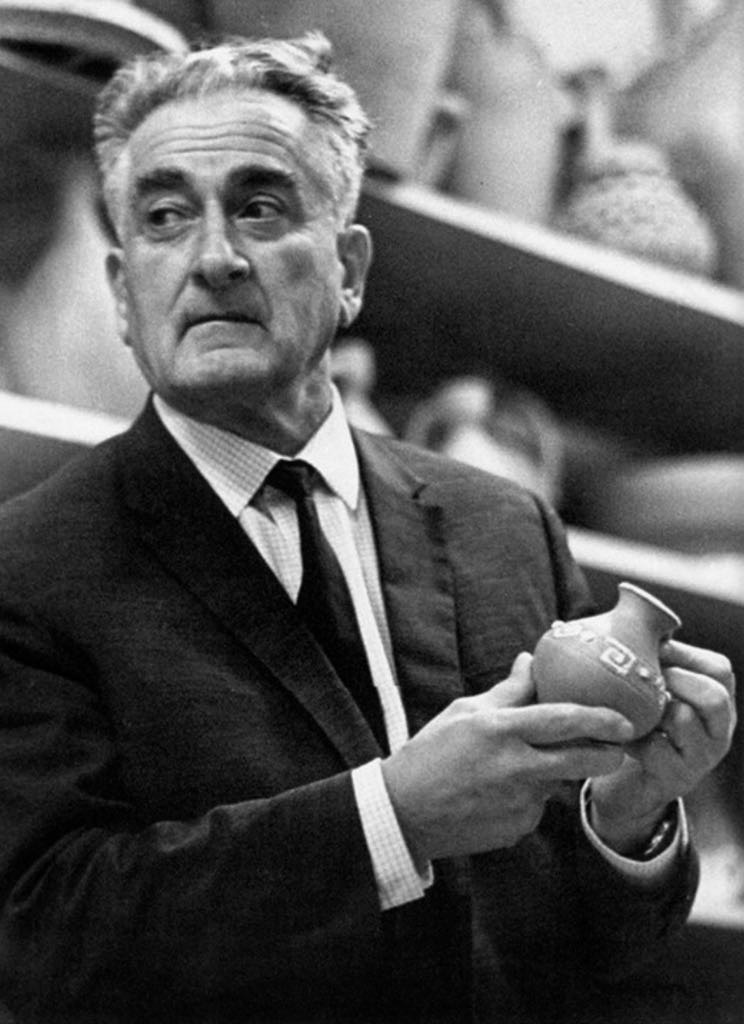
Apollon Kutateladze

- Yuri Ivanovich Pimenov (1903–1977), painter, graphic artist
- Apollon Kutateladze (1900–1972), painter
- Yevsey Moiseyenko (1916–1988), painter, graphic artist and teacher

=== 1971 ===
- Gapar Aytiyev (1912–1984), painter, stage designer
- Alexei Pakhomov (1900–1973), graphic artist and painter
- Boris Prorokov (1911–1972), satirist, political propaganda artist
- Nikolai Romadin (1903–1987), painter

=== 1972 ===
- Aleksandra Briede (1901–1992), sculptor
- Lado Gudiashvili (1886–1980), artist

=== 1973 ===
- Aminadav Kanevsky (1898–1976), graphic artist
- Tahir Salahov (1928–2021), painter
- Izzat Klychev (1923–2006), painter
- Zair Azgur (1908–1995), sculptor
- Pinkhos Sabsay (1893–1980), sculptor

=== 1974 ===
- Serhii Hryhoriev (1910–1988), painter and graphic artist (Указ от 18.04.1974)
- Aleksei Gritsai (1914–1998), painter
- Serhiy Shyshko (1911–1997), painter
- Pjotr Tarasovitsj Maltsev (1907–1993), painter
- Fyodor Pavlovich Reshetnikov (1906–1988), painter
- Ivan Maksimovich Semenov (1906–1982), graphic artist
- Nikolay Zinovyev (1888–1979), palekh miniature artist

=== 1975 ===
- Eduards Kalnin̦š (1904–1988), painter

=== 1976 ===
- Yervand Kochar (1899–1979), sculptor
- Simon Virsaladze (1909–1989), costume designer
- Andrei Mylnikov (1919–2012), painter
- Mykola Hlushchenko (1901–1977), painter
- Taras Gaponenko (1906–1993), painter

=== 1977 ===
- Edgars Iltners (1925–1983), painter
- Yury Kugach (1917–2013), painter
- Vasyl Borodai (1917–2010), sculptor
- Nikolay Afanasevitsj Ponomarjov (1918–1997), graphic artist
- Lev Kerbel (1917–2003), sculptor
- Joseph Serebriany (1907–1979), painter

=== 1978 ===
- Vladimir Tsigal (1917–2013), sculptor
- Moechamedchanafija Timirbolatovitsj Telzjanov (1927–2013), painter
- Mikhail Baburin (1907–1984), sculptor
- Mikhail Savicki (1922–2010), painter
- Pavel Bondarenko (1917–1992), sculptor
- Vladimir Shtranikh (1888–1981), painter

=== 1979 ===
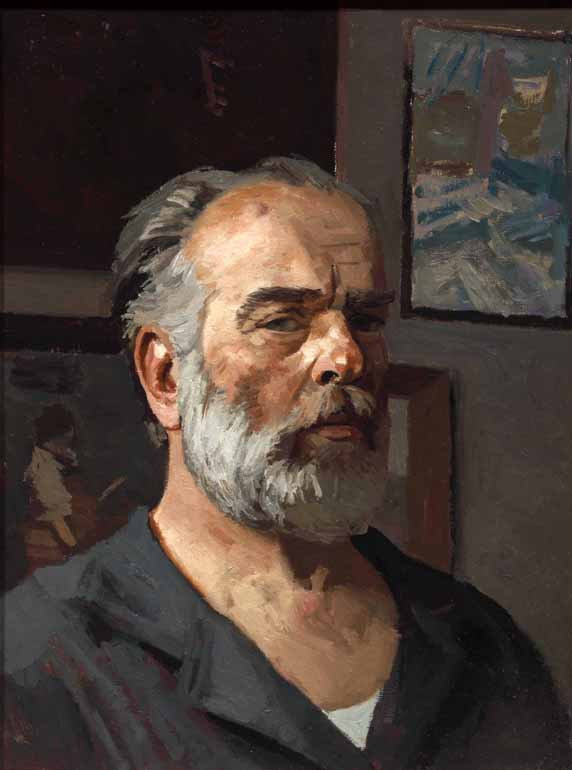
Geliy Korzhev, Self-portrait

- Viktor Puzyrkov (1918–1999), painter
- Geliy Korzhev (1925–2012), painter
- Oleksandr Kovalov (1915–1991), sculptor

=== 1980 ===
- Zinovy Vilensky (1899–1984), sculptor
- Zurab Tsereteli (1934–2025), painter and sculptor
- Haris Yakupov (1919–2010), painter
- Ilya Glazunov (1930–2017), artist
- Sulo Juntunen (1915–1980), painter
- Lindia Brodskaia (1910–1991), painter
- Dmitry Mochalsky (1908–1988), painter

=== 1981 ===
- Vitaly Goryayev (1910–1982), graphic illustrator, painter, cartoonist
- Ephraim Ivanovich Zverkov (1921–2012), painter
- Rahim Axmedov (1924–2008), painter

=== 1982 ===
- Boris Ugarov (1922–1991), painter
- Tetyana Yablonska (1917–2005), painter
- Iosif Sumbatashvili (1915–2012), stage designer
- Nikolay Nikoghosyan (1918–2018), sculptor, painter and graphic artist
- Boris Domashnikov (1924–2003), painter

=== 1983 ===
- Alexey Tkachyov (1925–2025), painter
- Sergey Tkachyov (1922–2022), painter
- Orest Vereisky (1915–1993), book illustrator
- Grigor Khanjyan (1926–2000), painter and graphic artist

=== 1985 ===
- Antanas Gudaitis (1904–1989), painter
- Mykola Oviechkin (1929–1993), painter
- Anna Alexandrovna Kotukhina (1915–2007), palekh miniature artist
- Kazys Morkūnas (1924–2014), stained glass artist
- Alexandr Shilov (b. 1943), painter and graphic artist, author of portraits
- Mikhail Bogdanov (1914–1995), production designer
- Vecheslav Zagonek (1919–1994), painter
- Yuri Korolyov (1929–1992), painter

=== 1986 ===
- Turgunbaĭ Sadykov (b. 1935), sculptor
- Yevgeny Shirokov (1931–2017), painter
- Boris Valentinovich Shcherbakov (1916–1995), painter
- Indulis Zariņš (1929–1997), painter

=== 1987 ===
- Gediminas Jokūbonis (1927–2006), sculptor
- Andrey Ilyich Kurnakov (1916–2010), painter, teacher
- Merab Berżenišvili (1929–2016), sculptor
- Oleg Komov (1932–1994), sculptor, graphic artist

=== 1988 ===
- Valentin Mikhailovich Sidorov (1928–2021), painter
- Mikhail Mikhailovich Taraev (1920–1996), ceramic artist
- Afanasiy Osipov (1928–2017), painter
- Elguja Amashukeli (1928–2002), sculptor
- Yulian Rukavishnikov (1922–2000), sculptor

=== 1989 ===
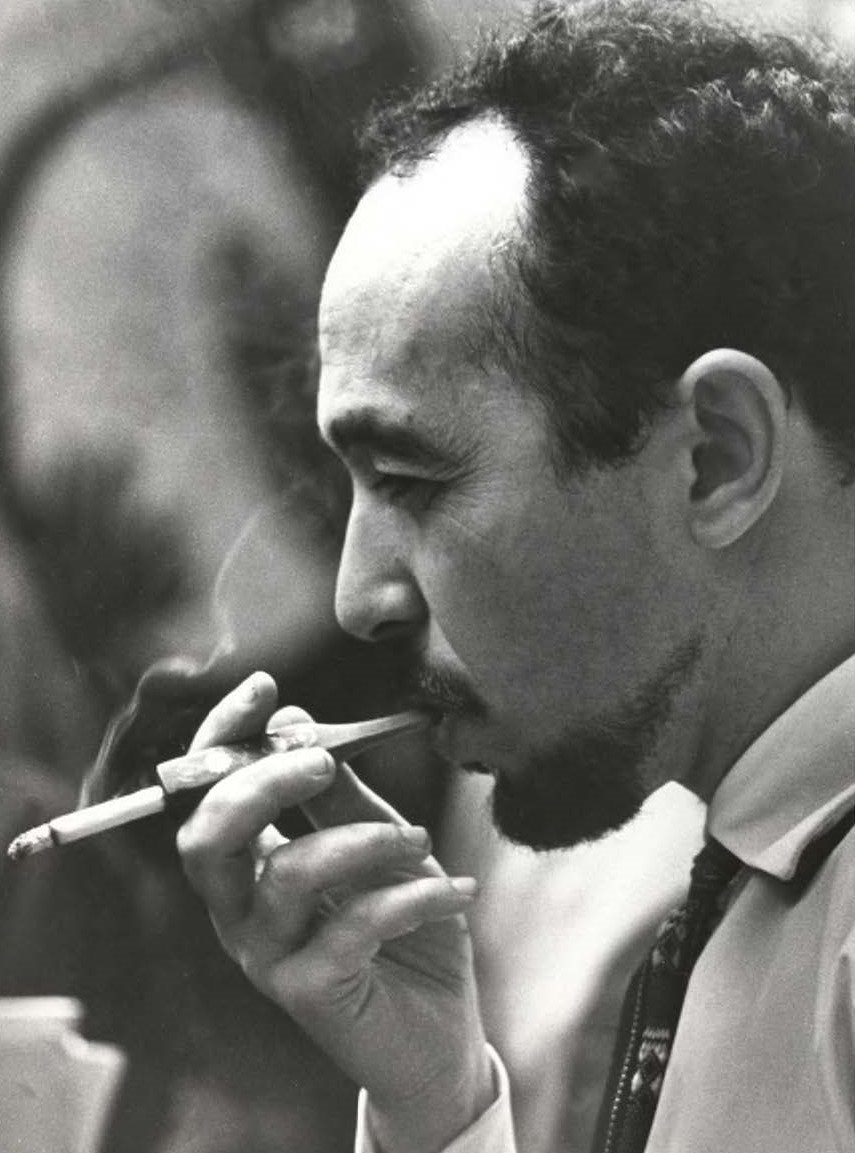
Togrul Narimanbekov

- Akhmat Lutfullin (1928–2007), painter
- Togrul Narimanbekov (1930–2013), painter, stage designer
- Valery Levental (1938–2015), stage designer
- Pyotr Pavlovich Ossovsky (1925–2015), painter, graphic artist

=== 1990 ===
- Leonid Soifertis (1911–1996), graphic artist
- Mariam Aslamazyan (1907–2006), painter
- Sukhrob Kurbanov (1946–2016), painter and graphic artist
- Viktor Ivanov (b. 1924), painter

=== 1991 ===
- Fedor Danilovich Konstantinov (1910–1997), graphic artist
- Andrey Vasnetsov (1924–2009), painter
- Vladimir Zamkov (1925–1998), painter
- Lyudmila Azarova (1919–2010), ceramic artist
- Vladimir Aleksandrovich Igoshev (1921–2007), painter and graphic artist
- Petr Timofeevich Fomin (1919–1996), painter and teacher

== Literature ==
- Народные артисты СССР. В 2-х т. / Авт.-сост. М. В. Музалевский и В. Л. Иванов. — Moscow: РИЦ «Кавалер», 2007.
- S. V. Bolotin [in Russian] (1995). Энциклопедический биографический словарь музыкантов-исполнителей на духовых инструментах [Encyclopedic Biographical Dictionary of Wind Musicians] (in Russian) (2-е изд., доп. и перераб. ed.). Moscow: Радуница. 358. ISBN 5-88123-007-8.
