= List of compositions by Rodion Shchedrin =

Rodion Shchedrin in 2017

This is a list of compositions by Rodion Shchedrin.

== Compositions ==
=== Stage works ===
==== Operas ====
- Not Love Alone, opera in three acts with epilogue (1961). First performance on 25 December 1961 in Moscow by the Bolshoi Theatre Chorus and Orchestra, Y. Svetlanov (cond).
- Dead Souls, opera in three acts (1976). Libretto by the composer. First performance on 7 June 1977 in Moscow by the Bolshoi Theatre Chorus and Orchestra, Y. Temirkanov (cond).
- Lolita, opera in three acts after Vladimir Nabokov's novel (1993). Libretto by the composer. First performance: 14 December 1994 in Stockholm by the Royal Opera of Stockholm, Mstislav Rostropovich (cond), Ann-Marget Petterson, John Conklin.
- The Enchanted Wanderer, opera for the concert stage for mezzo-soprano, tenor, bass, mixed chorus and orchestra (2001–2002). Story by Nikolai Leskov. Libretto by the composer. Commissioned by the New York Philharmonic to Lorin Maazel. First performance on 19 December 2002 in New York by the New York Philharmonic, New York Choral Artists, Lorin Maazel (cond).
- Boyarina Morozova, choral opera in two parts for four soloists, mixed chorus, trumpet, timpani and percussion (2006). Text from "The Life of the Archpriest Awwakum by himself" and "The Life of Boyarina Morozova". Libretto by the composer. First performance: 30 October 2006 in the Moscow Conservatory in a performance directed by Boris Tevlin.
- The Left-Hander, opera in 2 acts. Libretto by the composer after the novel by Nikolai Leskov. Concert performance on 26 June, and world stage premiere on 27 July 2013 at the Mariinsky II in St Petersburg, conducted by Valery Gergiev.
- A Christmas Tale, billed as an "Opéra féerie", libretto by the composer after Leskov's translation of Nemcova's fairy tale. World premiere at the Mariinsky Two in St.Petersburg, conducted by Valery Gergiev, 27 December 2015. The opera contains elements of the original Slavic tale of Cinderella as well as the Russian story of "The Twelve Months".

==== Ballets ====
- The Little Humpbacked Horse, ballet in four acts (1956). First performance on 4 March 1960 in Moscow by the Bolshoi Theatre, Gennady Rozhdestvensky (cond).
- Carmen Suite, ballet in one act (1967). First performance on 20 April 1967 in Moscow by the Bolshoi Theatre Orchestra, Gennady Rozhdestvensky (cond).
- Anna Karenina, ballet in three acts after Leo Tolstoy (1971). First performance on 10 June 1972 in Moscow by the Bolshoi Theatre, Y. Simonov (cond).
- The Seagull, ballet in two acts after Anton Chekhov's play (1979). First performance in 1980 in Moscow by the Bolshoi Theatre, Alexander Lazarev (cond).
- The Lady with the Lapdog, ballet in one act after Anton Chekhov (1985). First performance on 20 November 1985 in Moscow by the Bolshoi Theatre, Alexander Lazarev (cond).

==== Musical theatre ====
- Nina and the Twelve Months (1988). Musical in two acts on a libretto by T. Futjita after Samuil Marshak's story. First performance on 8 August 1988 in Tokyo.

==== Incidental music ====
- They Knew Mayakovsky, to the play by V. Katanyan (1954)
- Tempo, to the play by N. Pogodin (1955)
- First Symphony, to the play by A. Gladkov (1956)
- Mistery-Buffo, to the play by V. Mayakovsky (1957)
- The Sword of Damocles, to the play by N. Hikmet (1959)
- Thunderstorm, to the play by N. Ostrovsky (1961)
- Tyorkin in the Hereafter, to the play by A. Tvardovsky (1966)

=== Orchestral works ===
==== Symphonies ====
- Symphony No. 1 (1958) in three parts (1958). First performance on 6 December 1958 in Moscow by the Moscow Philharmonic Orchestra, Natan Rakhlin (cond).
- Symphony No. 2 "Twenty-Five Preludes" (1962–1965). First performance on 11 April 1965 in Moscow by the USSR Radio & TV Large SO, Gennady Rozhdestvensky (cond).
- Symphony No. 3. Symphony Concertante "Scenes of Russian Fairy Tales" in five parts (2000). Commissioned by Bayern Radio for Lorin Maazel and the Bavarian Radio Symphony Orchestra, who gave its first performance on 22 June 2000 in the Gasteig.

==== Concertos for orchestra ====
- Concerto for Orchestra No. 1 "Naughty Limericks" (1963). First performance in September 1963 in Warsaw by the Radio & TV Large SO, Gennady Rozhdestvensky (cond). First performance in Russia on 17 November 1963 in Moscow by the Moscow Philharmonic Orchestra, Kirill Kondrashin (cond).
- Concerto for Orchestra No. 2 "The Chimes" (1968). Commissioned by the New York Philharmonic for its 125th anniversary. First performance on 11 January 1968 in New York by the New York Philharmonic, Leonard Bernstein (cond).
- Concerto for Orchestra No. 3 "Old Russian Circus Music" (1989). Commissioned by the Chicago Symphony Orchestra for its 100th anniversary. First performance on 25 October 1990 in Chicago by the Chicago Symphony Orchestra, Lorin Maazel (cond).
- Concerto for Orchestra No. 4 "Round Dances (Khorovody)" (1989). Commissioned by Suntory. First performance on 2 November 1989 in Suntory Hall by the Tokyo Symphony Orchestra, Naohiro Totsuka (cond).
- Concerto for Orchestra No. 5 "Four Russian Songs" for symphony orchestra (1998). Commissioned by the BBC for the Proms Season 1998 to Dmitry Sitkovetsky. First performance on 7 August 1998 in the Royal Albert Hall of London by the Ulster Orchestra, Dmitry Sitkovetsky (cond)

==== Concertos for solo instrument with orchestra ====
- Piano
  - Piano Concerto No. 1 in four parts in D major (1954). First performance on 7 November 1954 in Moscow by the Conservatory Student Orchestra, Gennady Rozhdestvensky (cond), Rodion Shchedrin (piano). Re-orchestrated in 1974. First performance of the re-orchestrated version: 5 May 1974 in Moscow by the USSR SO, Yevgeny Svetlanov (cond), Rodion Shchedrin (piano).
  - Piano Concerto No. 2 in three parts (1966). Dedicated to Maya Plisetskaya. First performance on 5 January 1967 in Moscow by the USSR Radio & TV Large SO, Gennady Rozhdestvensky (cond), Rodion Shchedrin (piano).
  - Piano Concerto No. 3 "Variations and Theme" (1973). First performance on 5 May 1974 in Moscow by the USSR SO, Yevgeny Svetlanov (cond), Rodion Shchedrin (piano).
  - Piano Concerto No. 4 "Sharp Keys" in two parts (1991). First performance on 11 June 1992 in Washington by the Washington National SO, Mstislav Rostropovich (cond), Nikolay Petrov (piano).
  - Piano Concerto No. 5 in three parts (1999). Commissioned by SAVCOR (Hannu and Ulla Savisalo). Dedicated to Olli Mustonen. First performance on 21 October 1999 in the Dorothy Chandler Pavilion of Los Angeles by the Los Angeles Philharmonic, Esa-Pekka Salonen (cond), Olli Mustonen (piano).
  - Piano Concerto No. 6 "Concerto Lontano" for piano and string orchestra (2003). Commissioned by the Concertgebouw, Amsterdam. First performance on 6 August 2003 in the Concertgebouw of Amsterdam by the New European Strings Chamber Orchestra, conducted by Dmitri Sitkovetsky; Ekaterina Mechetina (piano).
- Trumpet
  - Concerto for trumpet and orchestra in two parts (1993). Commissioned by the Pittsburgh Symphony Orchestra. First performance on 30 September 1994 in Pittsburgh by the Pittsburgh Symphony Orchestra, Lorin Maazel (cond), George Vosburgh (trumpet).
- Cello
  - Concerto "Sotto Voce" for cello and orchestra in four parts (1994). Commissioned by Sir Jon and Lady Lyons for Mstislav Rostropovich and the London Symphony Orchestra. First performance on 8 November 1994 in London by the London SO, Seiji Ozawa (cond), Mstislav Rostropovich (cello).
  - Parabola Concertante for cello, string orchestra and timpani (2001). Commissioned by the Kronberg Academy to Mstislav Rostropovich. First performance on 28 October 2001 at the Cello festival of Kronberg by the Frankfurt Radio SO, Hugh Wolff (cond), Mstislav Rostropovich (cello)
- Viola
  - Concerto "Dolce" for viola, string orchestra and harp (1997). First performance on 30 December 1997 in Moscow by the Moscow Soloists, Yuri Bashmet (cond & viola).
- Violin
  - Concerto "Cantabile" for violin and string orchestra (1997). Dedicated to Maxim Vengerov. First performance on 10 July 1998 in the Tonhalle of Zurich by the Tonhalle Orchestra, Mariss Jansons (cond), Maxim Vengerov (violin).
- Oboe
  - Oboe Concerto (2010). First performance: 18 June 2010 in Amsterdam by Alexei Ogrinchuk (oboe) and the Royal Concertgebouw Orchestra, conducted by Susanna Mälkki.
- Others
  - Concerto "Parlando" for violin, trumpet and string orchestra (2004). First performance on 22 September 2004 in Saint Nazaire, France by the Chamber Orchestra Kremlin, conducted by Misha Rachlevsky with Philippe Graffin (violin) and Martin Hurrell (trumpet).
  - Double Concerto "Romantic Offering" for piano, cello and orchestra (2010). First performance: 9 February 2011 in Luzern by Martha Argerich (piano), Mischa Maisky (cello) and the Luzerner Sinfonieorchester, conducted by Neeme Järvi.
  - "The Adventures of a Monkey", concerto for narrator, trumpet, horn, flute, harp and two percussion players (2020)

==== Other orchestral works ====
- The Little Humpbacked Horse, first suite from the ballet, for symphony orchestra (1955). First performance in 1956 in Moscow by the State Cinematographic SO, Aleksandr Gauk cond.
- Chamber Suite for twenty violins, harp, accordion and two double basses (1961). First performance in 1962 in Moscow by a Violin Ensemble of the Bolshoi Theatre Orchestra, Y. Reyentovich cond.
- Not Love Alone, first symphonic suite from the opera, for mezzo-soprano and orchestra (1964)
- The Little Humpbacked Horse, second suite from the ballet, for symphony orchestra (1965)
- Symphonic Fanfares, festive overture for symphony orchestra (1967). First performance on 6 November 1967 in Moscow by the USSR Radio & TV Large SO, Gennady Rozhdestvensky cond.
- Not Love Alone, second version for chamber orchestra (1971). First performance on 20 January 1972 by the Moscow Chamber Opera Theater, Vladimir Delman cond.
- Anna Karenina, romantic music for symphony orchestra (1972). First performance on 24 October 1972 in Moscow by the USSR Radio & TV Large SO, Gennady Rozhdestvensky cond.
- Solemn Overture, Symphonic Salute on the occasion of the 60th anniversary of the USSR (1982). First performance in December 1982 in Moscow by the USSR Symphonic Academy Orchestra, Yevgeny Svetlanov cond.
- The Seagull, suite from the ballet, for symphony orchestra (1984). First performance on 14 January 1986 in New York by the New York National Orchestra, A. Kassuto cond.
- Music for the Town of Kothen, for chamber orchestra (1984). First performance on 17 February 1985 in Berlin by the Berlin Chamber Orchestra.
- Self-Portrait, variations for symphony orchestra (1984). First performance on 15 May 1984 in Moscow by the USSR State SO, D. Kakhidze cond.
- Music for strings, two oboes, two horns and celesta (1985). First performance in April 1987 in Leningrad by the Leningrad State Philharmonic Academic SO, F. Glushchenko cond.
- The Geometry of Sound for chamber orchestra (1987). First performance in May 1987 in Cologne by Soloists of the Bolshoi Theatre Orchestra, Alexander Lazarev cond.
- Stikhira (Hymn) for the Millennium of the Christianisation of Russia, for symphony orchestra (1988). Dedicated to Mstislav Rostropovich. First performance in March 1988 in Washington by the Washington National SO, Mstislav Rostropovich cond.
- Flageolets for Toru Takemitsu, for symphony orchestra (1990). First performance on 9 October 1990 in Tokyo by the Tokyo SO, H. Iwaki cond.
- Chrystal Gusli for symphony orchestra (1994). Dedicated to Toru Takemitsu. First performance on 21 November 1994 in Moscow by the Moscow State SO, I. Golovchin cond.
- Russian Photographs, music for string orchestra (1994). Dedicated to Vladimir Spivakov and the "Moscow Virtuosi". First performance on 29 Juli 1995 in Gstaad by the Moscow Virtuosi, V. Spivakov cond.
- Shepherd's Pipes of Vologda (Homage to Bartok) for oboe, English horn, horn and strings (1995). Commissioned by the Hungarian Radio. First performance on 1 October 1995 in the Marble Hall of Budapest by the Concentus Hungaricus Chamber Orchestra, Bela Kollar (oboe), Gergely Hamar (English horn), Zoltan Varga (horn), Laszlo Kovacs cond.
- Glorification (Velicanie) for string orchestra (1995). Commissioned by the World Economic Forum. First performance on 6 February 1996 in Davos at the World Economic Forum by the Moscow Chamber Orchestra, Constantine Orbelian cond.
- Slava, Slava (A Festive Ringing of Bells), for orchestra (1997). Dedicated to Mstislav Rostropovich for his 70th birthday. First performance 27 March 1997 in Paris by the Orchestre National de France, Seiji Ozawa cond.
- Preludium to Beethoven's Symphony No. 9, for orchestra (1999). Commissioned by the Nuremberg Symphony Orchestra. First performance on 5 January 2000 in the Meistersingerhalle of Nürnberg by the Nuremberg Symphony Orchestra, Jac van Steen cond.
- Lolita Serenade, symphonic fragments from the opera Lolita (2001). Commissioned by the Pittsburgh Symphony Orchestra to Mariss Jansons. First performance on 28 September 2001 in Pittsburgh by the Pittsburgh Symphony Orchestra, Mariss Jansons cond.
- Dialogues with Shostakovich, symphonic etudes for orchestra (2001). Commissioned by the Pittsburgh Symphony Orchestra. First performance on 8 November 2002 in Pittsburgh by the Pittsburgh Symphony Orchestra, Mariss Jansons cond.
- Vivat!, St. Petersburg Overture (2008). First performance: 12 December 2008 in St. Petersburg by the St. Petersburg Philharmonic Orchestra, conducted by Mariss Jansons cond.
- Beethoven's Heiligenstädter Testament (2008). Commissioned by the Bayerischer Rundfunk. First performance: 18 December 2008 in München by the Orchester des Bayerische Rundfunks, Mariss Jansons cond.
- Symphonic Diptych (2009). First performance: 20 April 2009 in Moscow by the Mariinsky Theatre Orchestra, Valery Gergiev cond.
- Lithuanian Saga (2009). First performance: 13 May 2009 in Vilnius by the London Symphony Orchestra, Valery Gergiev cond.
- Moscow-Petushki, dramatic fragment (2013). Commissioned by the Verbier Festival.

=== Vocal music ===
==== For soloist, chorus and orchestra ====
- Bureaucratiade, satirical cantata for soloists, chorus and small orchestra (1963). To texts of "Rules for Those Staying at the Kurpaty Boarding House". First performance on 24 February 1965 in Moscow by an Ensemble of Soloists and Chamber Orchestra, V. Delman (cond).
- Poetoria, concerto for poet accompanied by a woman's voice, mixed chorus and symphony orchestra (1968). To words by A. Voznesensky. First performance on 24 February 1968 in Moscow by the USSR Radio & TV SO and Chorus, Gennady Rozhdestvensky (cond), Andrei Voznesensky (poet).
- Lenin Is Amongst Us, oratorio for soprano, alt and bass, mixed chorus and symphony orchestra (1969). Traditional text. Dedicated to Lenin's centenary. First performance on 6 February 1970 in Moscow by the USSR Radio & TV SO and Chorus, Gennady Rozhdestvensky (cond), L. Zykina, L. Belobragina & A. Eisen (soloists).
- Long Life (Mnogia Leta) for mixed chorus, piano solo and three groups of percussion instruments (1991). Dedicated to G. Rozhdestvensky. First performance on 5 May 1991 in Moscow with Valery Polyansky (cond).
- Prayer (Molenie) for mixed chorus and symphony orchestra (1991). To words by Yehudi Menuhin. First performance on 7 March 1991 in Moscow by the Moscow Chamber Chorus and the USSR Ministry of Culture SO, Yehudi Menuhin (cond).

==== For one part solo ====
- Song and Ditties of Varvara from the Opera "Not Love Alone" (1961). Arrangement for mezzo-soprano and piano.
- Three Solfege Exercises, sonata for high voice and piano (1965). First performance on 13 October 1967 in Moscow by Z. Dolukhanova (voice) and N. Svetlanova (piano).
- Laments for voice with piano accompaniment (1965). Traditional words by V. Bokov. First performance on 31 January 1966 in Moscow by I. Arkhipova (voice) and R. Shchedrin (piano).
- "Tanja – Katja", songs without words in folkstyle for soprano and orchestra (2002). First performance on 12 December 2002 in Moscow by Russia State SO, Dmitry Sitkovetsky (cond), M. Gavrilova (voice)
- "Tanja – Katja II", songs without words in folkstyle for female voice and violin (2002)
- "My Age, My Wild Beast", vocal cycle for tenor, narrator and piano. Text by Osip Mandelstam. First performance on 6 February 2003 in Cologne Philharmonic by Mark Tucker (tenor) and Vladimir Ashkenazy (piano)
- Grusha's Gypsy Song (2008). First performance: 3 August 2008 in Verbier by Kristina Kapustinskaya and the Verbier Festival Orchestra, conducted by Valery Gergiev.
- "Cleopatra and the Serpent", a dramatic scene for woman's voice and orchestra (2011). Words from the final scenes of Shakespeare's tragedy "Antony and Cleopatra" in a translation of Boris Pasternak (2011). First performance on 28 May 2012 at the Salzburg Festival by M. Erdmann and the Orchestra of the Mariinsky Theatre, Valery Gergiev (cond).
- Balalaečka - Minoročka, romance in folk style on folk verses from old notebooks for female voice and string orchestra (2015)

==== Choruses a cappella ====
- Two Choruses to Lyrics by Alexander Pushkin for unaccompanied mixed chorus (1950)
- The Willow, vocalise for unaccompanied mixed chorus (1954)
- Four Choruses to Lyrics by Alexander Tvardovsky for unaccompanied mixed chorus (1968)
- Four Choruses to Lyrics by Andrei Voznesensky for unaccompanied mixed chorus (1971)
- Russian Villages, for unaccompanied mixed chorus (1973). Chorus to lyrics by Ivan Khabarov.
- A Woman was Washing Clothes, for unaccompanied mixed chorus (1975). Chorus to lyrics by J. Lyapin.
- The Execution of Pugachev, poem for mixed chorus a cappella (1981). Text by Alexander Pushkin. First performance on 10 March 1983 in Tallinn by the Moscow Conservatory Student's Chorus, Boris Tevlin (cond).
- Lines (Stanzas) from Eugene Onegin for mixed chorus a cappella (1981). Text by Alexander Pushkin. First performance in May 1982 in Moscow by the Conservatory Student's Chorus, B. Tevlin (cond).
- Concertino in four movements for chorus a cappella (1982). Commissioned by the Cork International Choral Festival. First performance on 5 May 1982 in Cork, Ireland by the Cork Festival Chorus and the Lialiumai Chorus, Albinas Piatrauskas (cond).
- The Sealed Angel, Russian liturgy for mixed chorus a cappella with shepherd's pipe (1988). Russian orthodox text. First performance on 18 June 1988 in the Tchaikovsky Concert Hall of Moscow by the Moscow Chamber Chorus and the State Academic Chorus of the USSR, Vladimir Minin (cond), Alexander Golyshev (flute).
- Two Russian Choirs (2008). First performance: 12 September 2008 in Moscow by the National Choir of Russian Conservatories, conducted by Boris Tevlin.
- Russian Folk Proverbs for mixed chorus a cappella (2019)
- Maya Plisetskaya — Eternal memory: Mass of Remembrance on the Epitath of Nikolai Gogol (2019), for mixed chorus a cappella.

=== Piano works ===
- Variation on a Theme by Glinka for piano (1957)
- Toccatina for piano (1958)
- Piano Pieces (1952–1961). Poem; Four Pieces from the ballet "The Humpbacked Horse"; Humoresque; Imitating Albeniz; Troika; Two Polyphonic Pieces
- Piano Sonata No. 1 in C major (1962). First performance on 24 April 1968 in Moscow by D. Bashkirov (piano)
- Twenty-Four Preludes and Fugues Volume 1 for piano (1964). Nos. 1–12 in sharp keys. First performance on 20 April 1965 in Moscow by R. Shchedrin (piano)
- Twenty-Four Preludes and Fugues Volume 2 for piano (1970). Nos. 13–24 in flat keys. First performance of the complete cycle on 27 January 1971 in Moscow by the composer
- Polyphonic Notebook, twenty-five preludes for piano (1972). First performance on 31 March 1973 in Moscow by R. Shchedrin (piano)
- Notebook for the Youth, fifteen pieces for piano (1981). First performance in March 1982 in Moscow by R. Shchedrin (piano)
- Piano Sonata No. 2 (1997). For Yefim Bronfman. First performance on 26 April 1997 in Oslo by Yefim Bronfman (piano)
- Naughty Limericks (Tschastuschki) for piano (1999). Revised version of Concerto for orchestra No. 1 "Naughty Limericks" (1963)
- Diary, seven pieces for piano (2002). First performance on 5 December 2002 in Moscow by Ekaterina Mechetina (piano)
- Questions, eleven pieces for piano (2003). First performance on 9 October 2004 in the Queen Elizabeth Hall of Londen by Olli Mustonen (piano)
- Marching Song for piano (2005).
- Sonatina Concertante for piano (2005). First performance on 23 November 2005 in Moscow by Alexander Ghindin (piano)
- A la Pizzicato for piano (2005). Commissioned by the International Adilia Alieva Competition for piano in Gaillard, France.
- Hommage a Chopin" for four pianos (2005). Revision of 1983 version. First performance: 20 September 2006 in Oslo by the Aurora Piano Quartet of Berlin
- Romantic Duets for piano four hands (2007). Commissioned by the Verbier Festival.
- Artless Pages (2009). First performance: 1 August 2009 in Verbier by Yuja Wang (piano)
- Concert Etude "Tchaikovsky Etude" (2011). Commissioned for the XIV International Tchaikovsky Competition. First performance: 20 June 2011 in Moscow
- Variation on a Theme of Diabelli (2019)

=== Chamber and instrumental works ===
- Suite for clarinet and piano (1951). First performance in 1952 in Moscow by B. Prorvich (clarinet) and R. Shchedrin (piano)
- In the Style of Albeniz for violin and piano (1973)
- The Frescoes of Dionysios for nine instruments (1981). First performance in October 1981 in Moscow by Soloists of the Bolshoi Theatre Orchestra
- Musical Offering for organ, three flutes, three bassoons and three trombones (1983). Written for the 300th Anniversary of J.S. Bach's birth. First performance on 21 October 1983 in Moscow by R. Shchedrin (organ), A. Korneyev, A. Poplavsky & I. Kopchevsky (flute), A. Arnitsans, A. Kapchelya & Y. Yevstrafiev (bassoon), N. Mironov, S. Shkolnik & E. Osipov (trombone)
- Echo Sonata for solo violin (1984). Written for the 300th Anniversary of J.S. Bach's birth. First performance on 27 June 1985 in Cologne by U. Hoelscher (violin)
- Three Shepherds, trio for flute, oboe and clarinet (1988). First performance on 25 July 1988 in Kuhmo (Finland) by Soloists of the Kirov State Opera and Ballet Theatre SO
- Russian Tunes (Russkie Naigryshi)" for cello solo (1990). Dedicated to Mstislav Rostropovich. First performance in November 1990 in Paris
- Echos on a Cantus Firmus by Orlando di Lasso for organ and soprano recorder (1994). First performance on 5 November 1994 in Munich by Markus Zahnhausen (flute) and Elisabeth Zawadke (organ)
- Piano-Terzetto for violin, cello and piano (1995). Commissioned by l'Association Parade, Paris to the Tchaikovsky Piano Trio. First performance on 17 April 1996 in the Conservatorio "G. Verdi" of Milan by the Tchaikovsky Piano Trio (Alexandre Brussilovsky (violin), Anatole Liebermann (cello), Konstantin Bogino (piano)
- The House of Ice, Russian fairy-tale for marimba solo (1995). First performance on 17 March in the Small Hall of Munich, Gasteig by Dmitri Nedelev (marimba)
- Music From Afar for two bass recorders (1996). I: Music from afar; II: Slavonic Dance.For Markus Zahnhausen. First performance on 9 November 1996 in the Laetare Church of Munich by Markus Zahnhausen and Markus Bartholome (bass-recorders)
- Sonata for cello and piano (1996). For Mstislav Rostropovich. First performance on 5 May 1997 in Monte Carlo by Mstislav Rostropovich (cello) and Rodion Shchedrin (piano)
- Pastorale for clarinet and piano (1997). For Jörg Widmann. First performance on 10 April 1997 in the Carl Orff-Saal, Gasteig of Munich by Jörg Widmann (clarinet) and Moritz Eggert (piano)
- Balalaika for violin solo (1997). For Maxim Vengerov. First performance on 29 March 1999 in Budapest by Maxim Vengerov (violin)
- Variations and Theme for violin solo (1998). Composed for the Fourth International Violin Competition "Leopold Mozart" in Augsburg. First performance on 21 November 1999 in Augsburg
- Menuhin Sonata for violin and piano (1999). Commissioned by the Credit Suisse Private Banking. First performance on 30 July 1999 in Saanen by Dmitri Sitkovetsky (violin) and Michel Dalberto (piano)
- Duo for violin solo (2000)
- Hamlet Ballad for four cellos or cello ensemble (2005). Commissioned by the International Cello Congress 2005 in Kobe (Japan) for the 1000 Cellist Concert. First performance on 22 May 2005 in Kobe (Japan) by M. Rostropovich (cond) and Naoto Otomo
- Ancient Melodies of Russian Folk Songs (2007). First performance: 24 May 2007 in London by Raphael Wallfisch (cello) and Rodion Shchedrin (piano)
- One for the Road (Na Pososhok) for six cellos and treble recorder (or flute, oboe, clarinet, trumpet and viola) (2007). In memory of Mstislav Rostropovich. Commissioned by the Kronberg Academy. First performance: 5 October 2007 at the Kronberg Academy Cello Festival in the St. Peter and Paul Church by the Ensemble Cellissimo: Julius Berger, Laszlo Fenyo, Sebastian Hess, Wolfgang Lehner, Wolfgang Tiepold and Raimund Trenkler (cellos) and an unknown performer (treble recorder)
- Belcanto in the Russian Mode (2008). First performance: 29 July 2008 in Verbier by Mischa Maisky (cello) and Rodion Shchedrin (piano)
- Lyrische Szenen (2008). Commissioned by Int. Musikwettbewerb ARD. First performance, 11 September 2008 in München by the Apollon Musagete Quartet
- Journey to Eisenstadt (2009). First performance: 1 December 2009 in London by Leonidas Kavakos (violin) and Nikolai Lugansky (piano)
- Dies Irae (2010). Commissioned by the International Orgelwoche Nürnberg – Musica Sacra. First performance: 5 June 2010 in Nürnberg by Edgar Krapp, Matthias Ank, Lutz Randow (organ) and Till Weser, Thomas Forstner (trumpet) and others

=== Arrangements ===
- The Nursery by Mussorgsky for voice and orchestra (1964)
- Two Tangos by Albéniz for orchestra (1996). First performance on 9 August 1997 in the Peabody Auditorium of Daytona by the London SO, M. Rostropovich cond.
- Orchestration of Prokofiev's Five Songs without Words, Nos. 1, 3, 4 & 5 (2007)

=== Film scores ===
- The Height (1957)
- The Communist (1957)
- People on the Bridge (1959)
- But What If This Is Love (1961)
- Anna Karenina (1967)
- Subject for a Short Story (1969)
- Anna Karenina (1975)
