= Mass (Bernstein) =

1971 musical theatre work by Leonard Bernstein

MASS
- A Theatre Piece for Singers, Players, and Dancers
- Musical theatre by Leonard Bernstein
- Logo
- Occasion: opening of the John F. Kennedy Center for the Performing Arts
- Text: Mass ordinary and texts by; Leonard Bernstein; Stephen Schwartz; additional text by Paul Simon
- Language: Latin; English; Hebrew
- Duration: about 2 hours
- Movements: 32
- Scoring: tenor (The Celebrant); three choirs (formal choir, boys' choir, street singers); two orchestras (pit orchestra, onstage orchestra)

Premiere
- Date: September 8, 1971
- Location: Kennedy Center, Washington, D.C.
- Conductor: Maurice Peress

Mass (formally: MASS: A Theatre Piece for Singers, Players, and Dancers) is a musical theatre work composed by Leonard Bernstein. The text includes the Latin mass text, with additional lyrics by Bernstein and by Stephen Schwartz. Commissioned by Jacqueline Kennedy, it premiered on September 8, 1971, directed by Gordon Davidson, conducted by Maurice Peress and choreographed by Alvin Ailey. The production used costume designs by Frank Thompson. The performance was part of the opening of the John F. Kennedy Center for the Performing Arts in Washington, D.C. Mass premiered in Europe in 1973, with John Mauceri conducting the Yale Symphony Orchestra in Vienna.

The work is based on the Tridentine Mass of the Catholic Church. The liturgical passages are sung mostly in Latin, though the "Sanctus" includes portions in Hebrew. Mass also includes additional texts in English written by Bernstein, Stephen Schwartz, and Paul Simon (who wrote the first quatrain of the trope "Half of the People"). The work is intended to be staged theatrically, but it has also been performed in a standard concert setting. Music critic Peter G. Davis in an analysis of the work's musical merits described Mass as a "work [of] vertiginous stylistic gamut with acid rock and 12-tone serialism, Renaissance polyphony and Mahler, jazz, Broadway and down-home Americana. ... Yes, Bernstein could manipulate a 12-tone row with the best of them."

Initial critical reception, including a review in The New York Times, was largely negative. The Columbia Records recording of the work enjoyed excellent sales, and in 2025 Richard Morrison commented at BBC Music that in recent years it has undergone something of a revival, with listeners more open to its chaotic blend of styles.

== Genesis ==
The concept of Mass derived from multiple sources: Bernstein's response to JFK's assassination and experience conducting at Robert F. Kennedy's funeral in 1968 in St. Patrick's Cathedral, Manhattan; the cultural upheaval of the 1960s and dissatisfaction with the Vietnam War; the Beethoven bicentenary in Vienna in 1970; and a small piece "A Simple Song" he wrote for Franco Zeffirelli's 1972 film Brother Sun, Sister Moon before withdrawing from that project after three months during which time he worked with Leonard Cohen. It also reflects his ongoing interest in what he called a "crisis of faith."

Paul Simon was also approached for music and lyrics for Brother Sun, Sister Moon, but he too declined. However, a quatrain he wrote while considering the commission was later presented to Bernstein for use in his Mass.

Mass is widely regarded as one of Bernstein's most ambitious and expansive compositions, incorporating a large ensemble and diverse musical styles.

== Cast ==
The original cast consisted of a Celebrant, three choirs, and altar servers. A full classical orchestra performed in the pit, while onstage musicians—including a rock band and a marching band—performed and interacted onstage.

- Celebrant – The central character of the work, a Catholic priest who conducts the celebration of the Mass.
- Formal choir – A mixed choir (SSAATTBB) in upstage choir lofts who sing the Latin portions of the Mass.
- Boys' choir – A children's choir (SSAA) that processes on and off stage various times, performing alone, in antiphon, or in concert with the Formal Choir and the Street Singers.
- Street chorus – Downstage and often performing around the Celebrant and the stage instrumentalists, a broad group of female and male singers representing the congregation (and occasionally the musicians), who variously participate in the prayers of the Mass, or alternately counter those prayers in a modern context.
- Acolytes – Assistants to the Celebrant, who perform dances and altar assistance throughout the Mass.

== Synopsis ==
The piece begins with pre-recorded 4-part contrary musics of vocal soloists and percussion. The resultant cacophony is cut off by a guitar and the Celebrant singing "A Simple Song".

Despite an initial wide-ranging eclecticism (evoking cool jazz, marching bands, world music, Lutheran chorale, and classical modernism) all of the performers are in apparent harmony and agreement. During the course of the Mass, however, the street chorus begins expressing doubts and suspicions about the necessity of God in their lives and the role of the Mass. The street chorus sings most frequently in English, troping on the Latin lyrics with a question, complaint, or self-serving boast; i.e. "dona nobis pacem" (English: "grant us peace") turns into the street chorus, "Give us peace NOW!" In this way, Bernstein interweaves and contrasts social commentary and prayer.

The street chorus's bitterness and anger continues to grow and makes each of the subsequent meditations more harsh. At the play's emotional climax, the growing cacophony of the chorus' complaining finally interrupts the elevation of the Body and Blood (the transubstantiated bread and wine). The Celebrant, in a furious rage, hurls the consecrated host, housed in an ornate cross-like monstrance, and the chalice, smashing them on the floor. At this sacrilege, the other cast members collapse to the ground as if dead while the Celebrant sings a solo. This solo blends the chorus's disbelief with his own crisis of faith. He feels worn out and wonders where the strength of his original faith has gone. At the end of his song, he too collapses.

A bird-like (Holy Spirit) solo begins again (now live flute, rather than taped oboe), finally "alighting" in a single clear note. An altar server, who was absent during the conflict, then sings anew the hymn of praise to God, "Sing God a Secret Song". This restores the faith of the three choirs, who join the altar server, one by one, in his hymn of praise. They tell the Celebrant "Pax tecum" (Peace be with you), and end with a hymn asking for God's blessing. The last words of the piece are: "The Mass is ended; go in peace."

== Movements ==
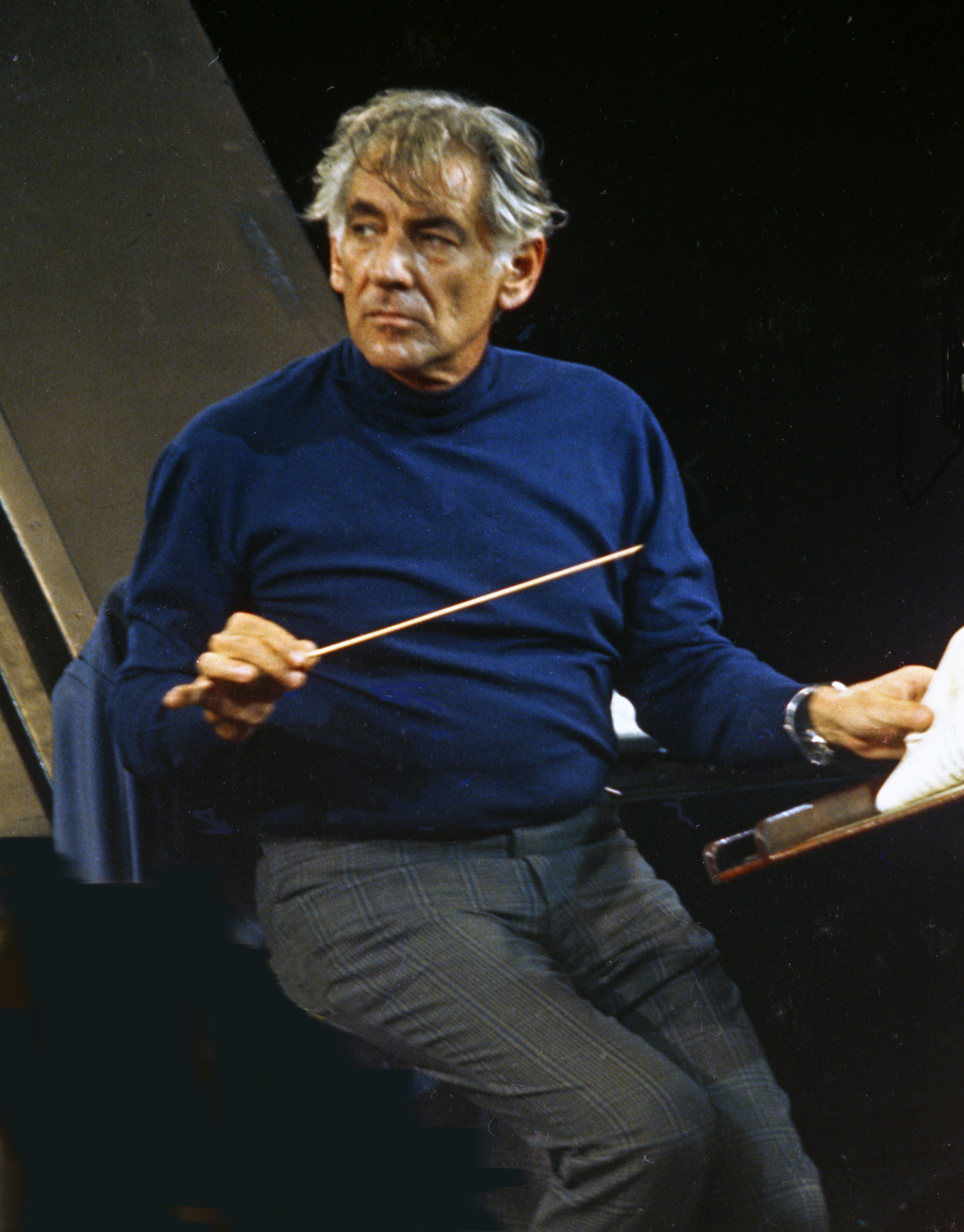
Leonard Bernstein conducting at the Royal Albert Hall in 1973

The movements of the work are as follows.

1. Devotions before Mass
  1. Antiphon: Kyrie eleison
  2. Hymn and Psalm: "A Simple Song"
  3. Responsory: Alleluia
2. First Introit (Rondo)
  1. Prefatory Prayers
  2. Thrice-Triple Canon: Dominus vobiscum
3. Second Introit
  1. In nomine Patris
  2. Prayer for the Congregation (Chorale: "Almighty Father")
  3. Epiphany
4. Confession
  1. Confiteor
  2. Trope: "I Don't Know"
  3. Trope: "Easy"
5. Meditation No. 1
6. Gloria
  1. Gloria tibi
  2. Gloria in excelsis
  3. Trope: "Half of the People"
  4. Trope: "Thank You"
7. Meditation No. 2 (Based on a theme from the 4th movement of Beethoven's 9th Symphony)
8. Epistle: "The Word of the Lord"
9. Gospel-Sermon: "God Said"
10. Credo
  1. Credo in unum Deum
  2. Trope: "Non Credo"
  3. Trope: "Hurry"
  4. Trope: "World without End"
  5. Trope: "I Believe in God"
11. Meditation No. 3 (De profundis, part 1)
12. Offertory (De profundis, part 2)
13. The Lord's Prayer
  1. Our Father ...
  2. Trope: "I Go On"
14. Sanctus
15. Agnus Dei
16. Fraction: "Things Get Broken"
17. Pax: Communion ("Secret Songs")

== Instrumentation ==
Bernstein scored Mass for a large orchestra and choir, and also included onstage groups. Bernstein divided the orchestra into two parts: the strings, keyboards, and most of the percussion are in the pit; while the woodwinds, brass, guitars, synthesizers, and other percussion are onstage. A small chamber instrumentation also exists. The large instrumentation is as follows:

=== Pit orchestra ===
Percussion (at least 4–5 players)

5 timpani
5 bongos
3 congas
2 snare drums
tenor drum
bass drum
4 tuned drums
crash cymbals
3 suspended cymbals
sizzle cymbal
splash cymbal
triangle
2 cowbells
chimes
2 tam-tams
anvil
5 temple blocks
2 wood blocks
tambourine
guiro
whip
ratchet
castanets
claves
2 xylophones
glockenspiel
marimba
vibraphone

Keyboards

celesta
piano
2 Allen organs (small and large)

Strings

1 harp
first violins
second violins
violas
cellos
double basses

=== Onstage groups ===
Stage orchestra:

Woodwinds

2 flutes (both doubling on piccolos)
2 oboes (2nd doubling on English horn)
3 clarinets in B♭ (1st doubling on soprano saxophone, 2nd doubling on alto saxophone and clarinet in E♭, 3rd doubling on tenor saxophone and bass clarinet in B♭)
2 bassoons (2nd doubling on contrabassoon)

Brass

4 horns in F
4 trumpets (1st doubling on piccolo trumpet)
3 trombones
1 tuba
2 sousaphones (optional)
shofar

Percussion (2 players)

bongos
2 drum sets (1 in the rock band, the other in the blues band)
finger cymbals
temple blocks
2 tambourines
glockenspiel
2 marching glockenspiels
bass drum
snare drum
crash cymbals
altar bells (only in “Sanctus” part, separate from the 2 players)

Keyboards

2 synthesizers (1 in the rock band, the other in the blues band)

Voices

high baritone solo (Celebrant)
boy soprano solo
SSAATTBB choir (at least 60 singers, in robes)
SSAA boys' choir (at least 20 singers, doubling on kazoos)

Strings

acoustic guitar
2 electric guitars (2nd doubling on banjo: in the rock band)
2 bass guitars (1 for the rock band, the other for the blues band)

Street musicians:

- Percussion: 3 steel drums, claves, bottles, tambourines, gourds, and tin cans
- Voices: at least 45 singers (20–30 soloists are used from this group)

In his instructions, Bernstein indicated that the percussion should be played by members of the street musicians.

He also calls for a pre-recorded tape.

== FBI warning ==
The Federal Bureau of Investigation kept a file on Bernstein because of his leftist views. In the summer of 1971, the Bureau warned the White House that the Latin text of Mass might contain anti-war messages, which could cause embarrassment to President Nixon should he attend the premiere and applaud politely. Rumors of such a plot by Bernstein were leaked to the press. According to Gordon Liddy, White House counsel John Dean stated that the work was "definitely anti-war and anti-establishment, etc". In the event, Nixon did not attend the premiere; Nixon had this decision described in the press as an act of courtesy to Jacqueline Kennedy Onassis, because he felt the formal opening "should really be her night".

== Other major performances ==
Much of the original cast reunited in a production at the Metropolitan Opera in New York City in July 1972.

The European première of Mass was performed in July 1973 at Vienna's Konzerthaus with a cast consisting of students from Yale University, a choir from Vienna, and the Yale Symphony Orchestra, all conducted by John Mauceri. Mauceri, a protégé of the composer who studied at Tanglewood, was then a faculty member at Yale, and director of the student orchestra. He conducted the piece at Yale in the fall of 1972, at which time the composer elected to take the cast and orchestra abroad. Bernstein's Amberson Enterprises sponsored the production, which used amateur performers because of union restrictions on taking the Kennedy Center cast abroad. Michael Hume, the son of The Washington Post music critic Paul Hume, sang the role of the Celebrant. Ted Libby, later a music critic for The New York Times and The Washington Post, was a member of the Street Chorus, as was the television actor Robert Picardo.

The Yale/Vienna production was filmed for television by ORF, the Austrian broadcasting system, under the direction of Brian Large, a producer of live music films. To date, this production has not been released on video, though it was broadcast several times in the United States by PBS, in its "Theatre in America" series. The producers of the PBS biography, Leonard Bernstein: Reaching for the Note, used clips from the film because no other high quality footage could be found. The design, direction and flavor of the production are redolent of the 1960s and 1970s, when Godspell, Hair, and Jesus Christ Superstar used similar anarchical styles to present counter-culture themes on stage.

On March 11 and 12, 1974, a fully staged performance of Mass was presented at Florida Atlantic University in Boca Raton, Florida. Under the direction of Richard Wright, this Florida premiere performance featured Robert Terry Whidden portraying the Celebrant, with choreography by Sharon Brooks.

The first British performance was staged at Coventry Theatre on May 16, 1976, by the University of Warwick with the City of Birmingham Symphony Orchestra, University of Warwick Chamber Choir and Chorus, Southend Boys' Choir, The London Chorale, Cycles Dance Company, Cameron (a pop group), conductor Roy Wales, Robert Carpenter Turner as the Celebrant, and producer Clive Barker. Roy Wales received permission directly from Leonard Bernstein in November 1974 to stage this British premiere, following a visit that Bernstein made to the University of Warwick in October 1974 when Roy Wales conducted a performance of Chichester Psalms in his presence. Wales had conducted the first London performance of Chichester Psalms on June 10, 1966, in the Duke's Hall at the Royal Academy of Music. The Coventry performance of Mass was followed the next night by the first London performance, at the Royal Albert Hall, on May 17, 1976, and this was reviewed in the Financial Times by Paul Griffiths and by William Mann in The Times, both May 18, 1976. Most reviews of the Royal Albert Hall premiere were mixed, but the performance was widely praised. In the Financial Times, Griffiths wrote, "Given such poor material, this performance was almost a miracle of transubstantiation. The playing of the City of Birmingham Symphony Orchestra was full, bold and vigorous, and so too was the singing of the University of Warwick Chorus, joined by the excellent Southend Boys' Choir. Roy Wales had clearly trained his forces exceptionally well."

In 1981, the Kennedy Center mounted a tenth anniversary production, directed by Tom O'Horgan and conducted by John Mauceri, that was broadcast on September 19, 1981 ("Live from the Kennedy Center"). Donal Henahan described the work as even shallower than he remembered it from 1972 at the Metropolitan Opera.

In 1982, a production was mounted in Berlin's Deutschlandhalle conducted by Bernstein protégé David Charles Abell, directed by Wolfgang Weber, and choreographed by William Milié.

Ten years after staging the British premiere, Roy Wales conducted the Australian premiere on April 11, 1986, in the Queensland Performing Arts Centre. Performed by The Brisbane Philharmonic Orchestra, Brisbane Chorale, Queensland Conservatorium singers and with Jonathon Welch as the Celebrant, staged by Giuseppe Sorbello, and choreography by dance designer Ruth Gabriel, the performances were critically acclaimed.

In 2000, Mass was staged and performed at the Vatican as part of the Jubilee 2000 celebrations of the Roman Catholic Church. Pope John Paul II attended that special event. The Celebrant was portrayed by Douglas Webster and the boy soprano role was split by identical twins Pascal Le Boeuf and Remy Le Boeuf.

On November 19, 2002, with the Collegiate Chorale and the Orchestra of St. Luke's staged a production in New York City with Robert Bass conducting. The Celebrant was portrayed by Douglas Webster and the boy soprano was sung by James Burnett Danner. Soloists included Geoffrey Blaisdell, Peter Buchi, Charis Fliermans, D. Michael Heath, Jan Horvath, Andre McCormick, Warren Moore, Anika Noni Rose, Liz Queler, and Lori Rivera. Writing in The New York Times, Anthony Tommasini wrote: "In retrospect it's hard to understand the hostility the work provoked. Admittedly the text is glibly anti-establishment and often mawkish. But after 9/11, a line like 'Everyone who hates his brother is a murderer' no longer seems such pap." He praised some moments but faulted others for sounding like "a rush job". He praised the performance and concluded: "In many ways Mass is an earnest mess, but it got to this baby boomer. Here is Uncle Lenny trying to make sense of it all. You have to love the guy."

The University of Illinois Urbana-Champaign presented a gala production of Mass at the Krannert Center for the Performing Arts, with student performers from the theater and dance departments and School of Music, in October 2006 in honor of the College of Fine and Applied Arts' 75th anniversary. Ricardo Herrera sang the part of the Celebrant; the performance was directed by James Zager, choreographed by John Dayger, and conducted by Eduardo Diazmuñoz. Chester Alwes and Fred Stoltzfus prepared the chorus.

=== 40th anniversary ===
2011 saw several performances of Mass commemorating the 40th anniversary of its premiere in 1971. Among these were a production presented by the Anchorage Concert Chorus, Alaska Children's Choir, and Alaska Dance Theatre in the Atwood Concert Hall on March 18 and 20 in Anchorage, Alaska, and the University of Colorado at Boulder in the Boettcher Concert Hall (Denver) on April 26. A full-stage production was performed at the Benjamin and Marian Schuster Performing Arts Center in Dayton, Ohio, May 13 and 14, featuring the Dayton Philharmonic, conducted by Neal Gittleman, and actors, singers and dancers from Wright State University, directed by Greg Hellems, choreographed by Gina Walther, with musical direction by Hank Dahlman, as well as the Kettering Children's Choir, featuring John Wright as the Celebrant, and produced by W. Stuart McDowell.

The BBC performed Mass as part of their 2012 Proms music festival at Royal Albert Hall. Featured was Morten Frank Larsen as the Celebrant, the BBC National Orchestra of Wales, the BBC National Chorus of Wales, and the National Youth Choir of Wales.

Mass was performed on March 9 and 10, 2012, at the Adelaide Festival Theatre during the 2012 Adelaide Festival of Arts with Kristjan Järvi conducting. The Celebrant was Jubilant Sykes, performing with the Adelaide Symphony Orchestra, Absolute Trio, and the Adelaide Festival Chorus and Children's Choir. Soloists included James Egglestone, Carolyn Ferrie, Leah Flanagan, Adam Goodburn, Lane Hinchcliff, David Linn, Nic Lock, Beau Daniel Loumeau, Samantha Mack, Libby O'Donovan, Mark Oates, Kirsty-Ann Roberts, Gary Rowley, Danielle Ruggiero, Sally-Anne Russell, and James Scott. The director was Andy Packer and the chorus director was Carl Crossin. A very positive review in Limelight magazine described the production as "a brave production of a brave work that doesn't shy away from exposing the contradictions and hypocrisy of life with or without religion". This performance was described in Festival publicity as the "Australian première" but in fact several earlier Australian performances were held: in Sydney in 1987 by the NSW State Conservatorium of Music, with Peter Cousens as the Celebrant, conducted by Ronald Smart; in Brisbane in 1986 by the Brisbane Chorale; in Melbourne in 1989 by the State Orchestra of Victoria; and in Adelaide at the 52nd Intervarsity Choral Festival in 2001.

The Philadelphia Orchestra presented a staged version of Mass at the Kimmel Center for the Performing Arts, April 30 – May 3, 2015. Yannick Nézet-Séguin conducted and Kevin Vortmann sang the role of the Celebrant. The production was recorded by Deutsche Grammophon and released in 2018, as part of the Bernstein Centenary celebrations.

The Conservatorium of Music in Sydney again staged Mass at the Sydney Opera House, with Christopher Hillier as the Celebrant and Eduardo Diazmunoz conducting as part of the Conservatorium's centenary.

On November 13, 14, and 15, 2015, a full-staged production of Mass was performed by the opera, orchestra, and choir departments of the Blair School of Music at Vanderbilt University, with Steven Fiske as the Celebrant. The production was directed by Gayle Shay, the chorus was directed by Tucker Biddlecombe, and the conductor was Robin Fountain.

=== Bernstein Centennial ===
In February 2018, Los Angeles Philharmonic staged a production of Mass at the Walt Disney Concert Hall directed by Elkhanah Pulitzer for the Bernstein centennial. The production was then revived at Lincoln Center for the July 2018 Mostly Mozart Festival.

On 6 and 7 April 2018, at the Royal Festival Hall in London, Marin Alsop conducted the Mass Orchestra, comprising young musicians from Chineke! Junior Orchestra and the National Youth Orchestra of Great Britain, plus Tony award-winner Paulo Szot in a performance of Bernstein's Mass. Performers: National Youth Orchestra of Great Britain, Chineke! Junior Orchestra, Marin Alsop (conductor), Paulo Szot (celebrant), Maia Greaves (treble), Freddie Jemison (treble), Leo Jemison (treble), Voicelab, Trinity Laban Conservatoire of Music and Dance, Finchley Children's Music Group, Avanti House Secondary School (Harrow), Millennium Performing Arts, Tring Park School for the Performing Arts, Streetwise Opera, Woven Gold, Choir With No Name, Yeast Culture (visuals), Lilian Baylis Technology School (visuals).

On July 28, 2018, Mass made its professional Chicago area debut at the Ravinia Festival in Highland Park, Illinois. The staged performance was part of the festival's season-long tribute to Bernstein to honor the composer's centenary. Marin Alsop conducted the Chicago Symphony Orchestra in its debut performance of the piece. Paulo Szot reprised his role as celebrant for the performance. Other performers included the Chicago Children's Choir, Vocality, and the Highland Park High School Marching band. The production's creative director was Kevin Newbury. An encore performance was given on July 20, 2019, by many of the same performers and members of the creative team. The encore performance was filmed for the PBS series, Great Performances. The episode first aired on May 16, 2020.

As part of the 2018 Bernstein centennial celebrations, more than thirty other productions took place around the world, including at multiple universities. In October 2018, the University of Virginia presented the work with the UVA University Singers, orchestra, dancers, community and youth choirs, and Kevin Vortmann as Celebrant. Michael Slon conducted, Bob Chapel directed, with sets by Tom Bloom, and choreography by former Alvin Ailey American Dance Theater dancer Demetia Hopkins-Greene. On December 6, 7, 8, and 9, 2018 the San Diego State University School of Music and Dance and School of Theatre, Television, and Film ran a production of Mass with performers from the orchestra, choirs, jazz department, the Marching Aztecs, and MFA in Musical Theatre program with André Ward as the Celebrant. The production was conducted by Michael Gerdes.

On May 10 and 12, 2019, the San Jose State University School of Music and Dance presented a production of Mass at the Hammer Theater Center in downtown San Jose, CA. Fred Cohen, conductor; Sandra Bengochea, stage director.

On September 15, 17, 18, 2022, as the concluding event of the Kennedy Center's 50th anniversary celebration, Mass returned 51 years after its world premiere at the Center's 1971 opening gala. Directed by Alison Moritz and choreographed by Hope Boykin, the performances featured the National Symphony Orchestra, conductor James Gaffigan, and 2020 Marian Anderson Award winner Will Liverman as the Celebrant.

== Recordings ==
- 1971: Alan Titus (Celebrant), Norman Scribner Choir, Berkshire Boy Choir, Studio Orchestra, Leonard Bernstein (conductor) – Columbia Records
- 2004: Jerry Hadley (Celebrant), Rundfunkchor Berlin, Berlin Cathedral Chorus, Deutsches Symphonie-Orchester Berlin, Pacific Mozart Ensemble, Kent Nagano (conductor) – Harmonia Mundi (The 2004 version is Grammy Nominated)
- 2008: Randall Scarlata (Celebrant), Tölzer Knabenchor, Chorus Sine Nomine, Tonkünstler-Orchester, Kristjan Järvi (conductor) – Chandos
- 2009: Jubilant Sykes (Celebrant), Morgan State University Choir, Peabody Children's Chorus, Morgan State University Marching Band, Baltimore Symphony Orchestra, Marin Alsop (conductor) – Naxos (Grammy-nominated)
- 2015: Kevin Vortmann (Celebrant), Temple University Concert Choir, Westminster Symphonic Choir, American Boychoir, Temple University Diamond Marching Band, Philadelphia Orchestra, Yannick Nézet-Séguin (conductor) – Deutsche Grammophon, 2018
- 2020: Vojtěch Dyk (Celebrant), Wiener Singakademie, Schülerinnen und Schüler der Opernschule, Vienna State Opera, Company of Music, Vienna Radio Symphony Orchestra, Dennis Russell Davies (conductor) – Capriccio

== Video ==
Although several performances were televised, none are available commercially. There is one DVD version:

- 2004: Leonard Bernstein Mass at the Vatican City (2000) (ASIN B0002S641Y) Douglas Webster (Celebrant) – Kultur Video
