= Edward Tsanga =

Russian opera singer

Edward Tsanga (Russian: Цанга, Эдуард Николаевич; Syktyvkar, 20 October 1979 – 14 January 2017, Saint Petersburg) was a Russian operatic bass-baritone at the Mariinsky Opera. His video recordings include roles in two operas under Valery Gergiev: as the tsar in Rimsky-Korsakov's The Tale of Tsar Saltan, and Platov in Rodion Shchedrin's The Left-Hander.
