= The Sealed Angel (Shchedrin) =

Choral composition by Rodion Shchedrin

The Sealed Angel (Zapechatlennyi angel) is a Russian-language composition by Rodion Shchedrin in the form of liturgical music based on the story "The Sealed Angel" by Nikolay Leskov. The plot concerns a rural community which protects a religious icon that has been confiscated by officials and sealed with wax. The work is written for soprano, mezzo or alto, tenor, choir boy soloists, flute or oboe, and choir.

The work has nine continuous movements. Performances typically last just under an hour.

== Recordings ==
- State Academic Russian Choir & The Moscow Chamber Choir, Vladimir Minin; Melodiya
- State Choir Latvija, Maris Sirmais; Wergo
- Choir of Gonville & Caius College, Cambridge & The Choir of King's College London, Geoffrey Webber & David Trendell; Delphian
- Soloists Berlin Radio Choir, Stefan Parkman; Coviello
- Chicago Chorale, Bruce Tammen; Self-published
