= Melikhov =

Melikhov (Russian: Мелихов) is a surname. It may refer to:

- Aleksandr Melikhov (born 1998), Russian football player
- Anatoli Melikhov (born 1943), Kazakhstani ice hockey coach
- Artyom Melikhov, Russian tenor singer
- Igor Melikhov (born 1944), Russian diplomat
- Yury Melikhov (1937–2000), Russian cyclist

== See also ==
- Melikhovo, a writer's house museum in the former country estate of the Russian playwright and writer Anton Chekhov. The estate is about forty miles south of Moscow near Chekhov
