= Artyom Melikhov =

Russian tenor singer

Artyom Melikhov (Russian: Артём Мелихов) is a Russian tenor singer who was born in Saint Petersburg. He graduated from both the Glinka Choral School and Saint Petersburg Conservatory where he was under guidance from Yelizaveta Kudryavtseva till 2006. In 2008 under guidance from Valery Gergiev he played a role of one of the Japanese envoys in Le Rossignol opera and during the same year played a soloist role in Chimes at the Mariinsky Theatre. In 2009 he had his first appearance with Mariinsky Theatre where he played in an opera called War and Peace. That year was followed by such 2010 debuts as The Mystery of the Apostle Paul in which he sang in a role of Nero at the Mariinsky Theatre and another War and Peace performance, this time at the John F. Kennedy Center for the Performing Arts. In 2011 he became the Mariinsky Academy of Young Singers soloist and the same year performed the role of Ovlur in an opera called Prince Igor following by his appearance in Dead Souls and Ariadne auf Naxos. In May 2013 he was Rienzi performer at the Saratov Opera in Alexei Stepanyuk's production and the same year sang at the Carmina Burana opera after which he went on a tour to Naples where he performed at the Teatro di San Carlo.

== Mariinsky Theatre ==
- Prince Igor—Ovlur
- War and Peace—Servant at the Ball, Prince Andrei’s Orderly, Prince Eugene’s Aide de Camp, Madman
- The Nose—The Nose
- The Mystery of the Apostle Paul—Nero
- Dead Souls—Selifan
- The Enchanted Wanderer—flogged monk, Prince, Magnetiser, old man in the woods, storyteller
- Il trovatore—messenger
- Samson and Delilah—Philistine messenger
- Ariadne auf Naxos—Brighella
- Carmina Burana
- Eugene Onegin—Lensky
- Aleko—young gypsy
- Lohengrin—main role
- The Bells
- Mazart's Requiem
- Verdi's Requiem
- St John's Passion
