= Boyarina Morozova (opera) =

Opera by Rodion Shchedrin

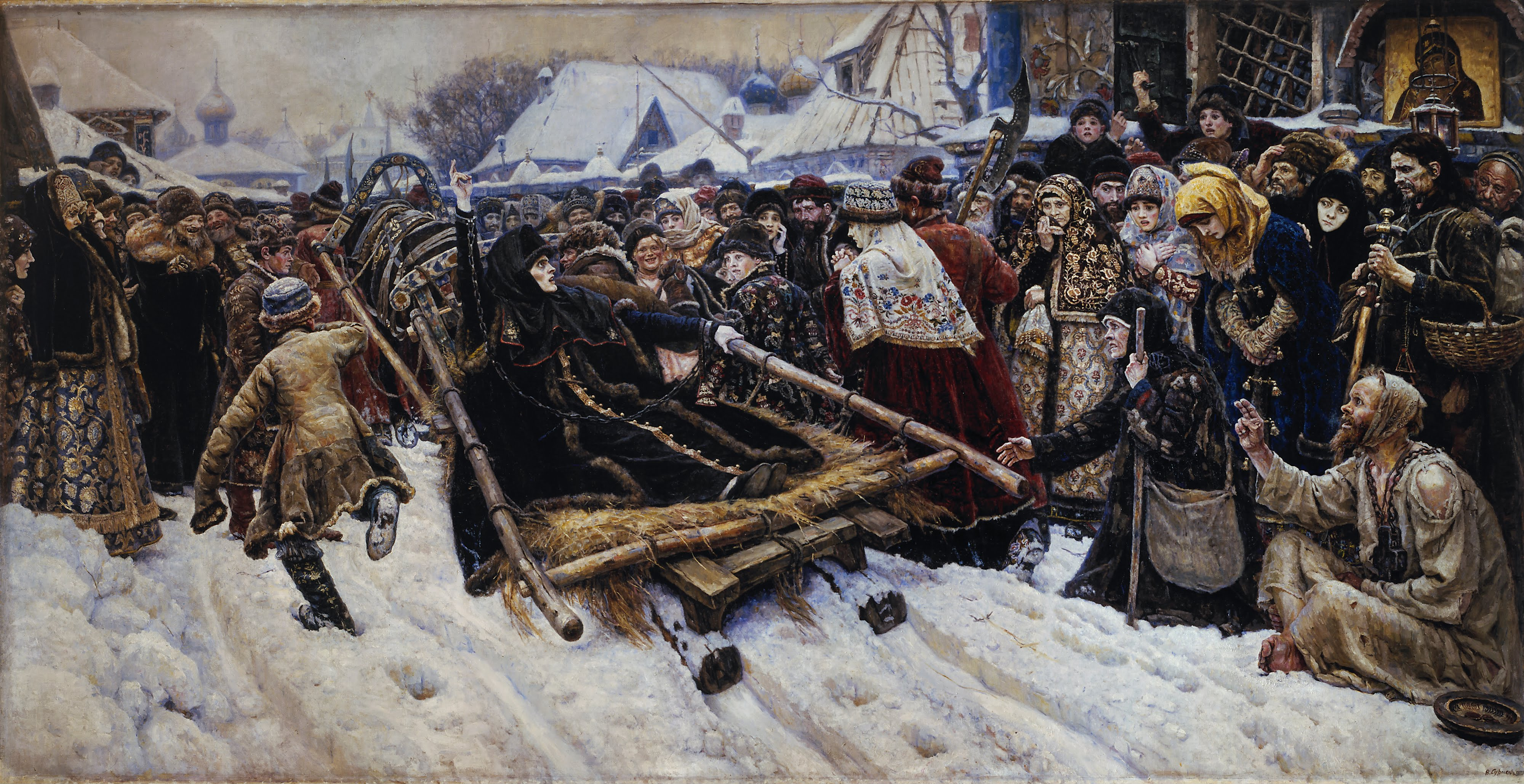
Boyaryna Morozova (1887) by Vasily Surikov depicting the Boyarina's arrest by Orthodox Believers, depicting an elderly Old Believer woman being arrested and carried off on a sled, with two fingers raised in an Old Believer sign of the cross.

Boyarina Morozova (Боярыня Морозова) is a 2006 choral opera by Rodion Shchedrin based on his own libretto on the story of Boyarina Morozova (d.1675), from the account of archbishop Avvakum and inspired by the painting Boyarina Morozova by Vasily Surikov.
