= Roy Wales =

British conductor (1940–2024)

Roy Frederick Wales BEM (9 November 1940 – 12 February 2024) was a British choral, orchestral and operatic conductor, and a recipient of a British Empire Medal for Services to Choral Music in HM the Queen's 2020 New Year Honours.

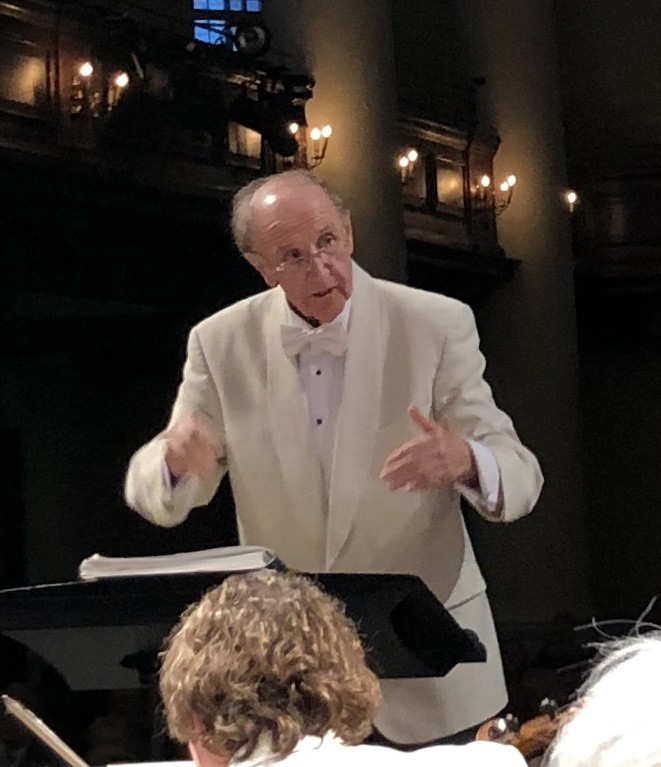
Roy Wales conducting Handel's Israel in Egypt, April 2019, St John's Smith Square London

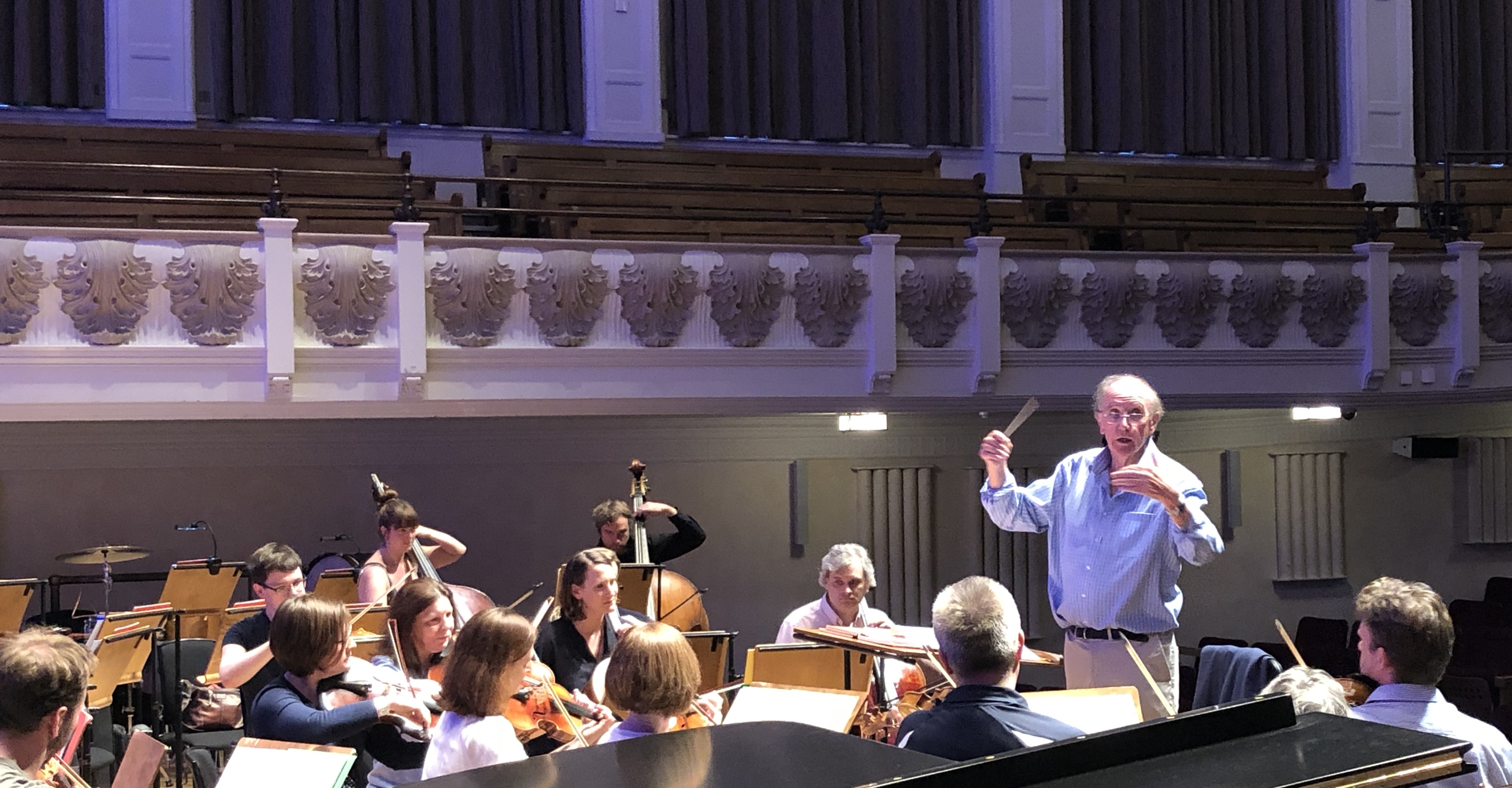
Wales in rehearsal with English Concert Orchestra & Chorus, Cadogan Hall, London, May 2018

== Background ==
Roy Frederick Wales was born in Guernsey in the Channel Islands on 9 November 1940, during the German Occupation. He first became involved in music via the local Salvation Army band.

Wales married Christine Galer (born 1944) in 1969. Together they had two children; Simon (born 1972) and Anna (born 1975). Roy Wales died on 12 February 2024, at the age of 83.

== Career ==
In 1959, Wales left Guernsey and undertook teacher training in Bognor Regis. In 1961 he commenced music studies in London at Trinity College of Music, studying singing with Gwynn Parry Jones.

Wales formed his first choir, the London Student Singers in 1963. In the same year, he appeared in a professional barbershop quartet called The Nutcrackers in Blackpool for a summer season, and he sang in a pantomime Dick Whittington at the Golders Green Hippodrome in London the same year, in a cast featuring Beryl Reid and Tommy Cooper.

From 1964 onwards, Wales took choirs to international choral festivals, starting with the International Student Cultural Festival in Istanbul. In 1965, Wales took his London Student Chorale to the Montreux International Choral Festival in Switzerland, where they were first prize winners.

In 1965, Wales joined the George Hurst Summer Conducting Course at Canford, Dorset, alongside fellow conductors Andrew Davis and John Eliot Gardiner. Wales undertook postgraduate conducting studies at the Guildhall School of Music & Drama with conductor Stanford Robinson, winning the Conducting Prize and Kapsalis Memorial Cup in 1966.

As a singer, Wales performed with the Chorus of the Royal Opera House in the first ROH production of Arnold Schoenberg's Moses und Aaron conducted by Georg Solti. In January & February 1967, he sang with Sadler's Wells Opera Company in Janáček's From The House of the Dead.

During his career, he held positions including Head of Music at Sweyne School, Rayleigh, Essex from 1967 to 1968, Director of Music for the County Borough of Southend-on-Sea from 1968 to 1973, Director of Music at the University of Warwick from 1974 to 1980, Director of the Queensland Conservatorium of Music (now Queensland Conservatorium Griffith University) from 1981 to 1987, and Principal of the Birmingham School of Music (now Royal Birmingham Conservatoire) from 1987 to 1989.

Through his career he founded many choirs and choruses including the London Student Chorale and London Chorale, Southend Festival Chorus, Brisbane Chorale in 1983, and the English Concert Singers and Chorus in 1989.

In May 2003, Wales founded the Cornwall International Male Voice Choral Festival, and he was the Festival Vice President. The first Festival featured 50 choirs from Cornwall, the wider UK and internationally.

In 2011, Wales founded Rottingdean Arts and was its first chairman and artistic director. In 2013, Wales was nominated as a finalist in the Argus Achievement Awards for Contribution to Arts and Culture for his work with Rottingdean Arts.

== Premieres of works by Leonard Bernstein ==
On 6 June 1966, Wales conducted the first London performance of Leonard Bernstein's Chichester Psalms with the London Academic Orchestra, London Student Chorale and Pro Arte Singers in the Duke's Hall of the Royal Academy of Music. Bernstein's work also featured in the official opening concert of the University of Warwick Arts Centre in October 1974, in the presence of the Composer, who was the recipient of an Honorary Doctorate from the university.

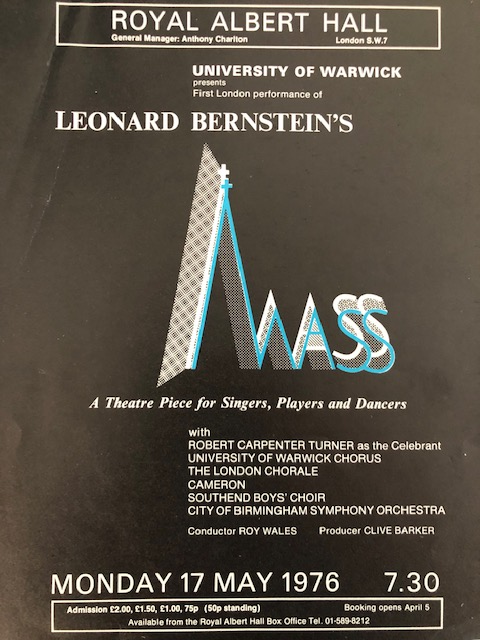
Flyer for London Premiere of Bernstein's Mass 17 May 1976 Royal Albert Hall

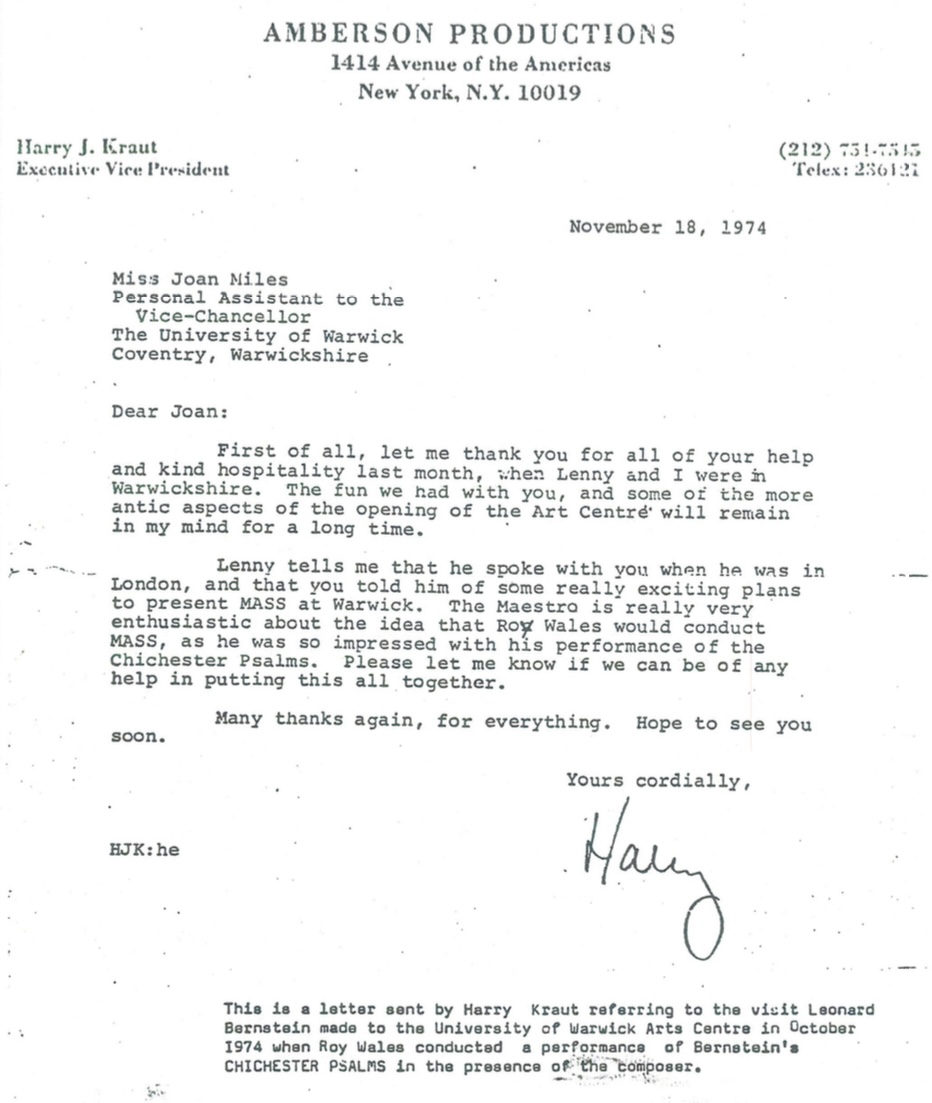
This letter concerns the proposal for the University of Warwick to present the UK Premiere of Bernstein's MASS.

Wales received personal permission from Leonard Bernstein to give the UK Premiere of his Bernstein Mass in Coventry Theatre on 16 May and the Royal Albert Hall on 17 May 1976. Performers included the City of Birmingham Symphony Orchestra, London Chorale, Cycles Dance Company, The London Chorale and University of Warwick Chorus.

Wales also conducted the Australian premiere of the Bernstein Mass on 11 April 1986 in the Concert Hall of the Queensland Performing Arts Centre, with the celebrant Jonathon Welch amongst the performers.

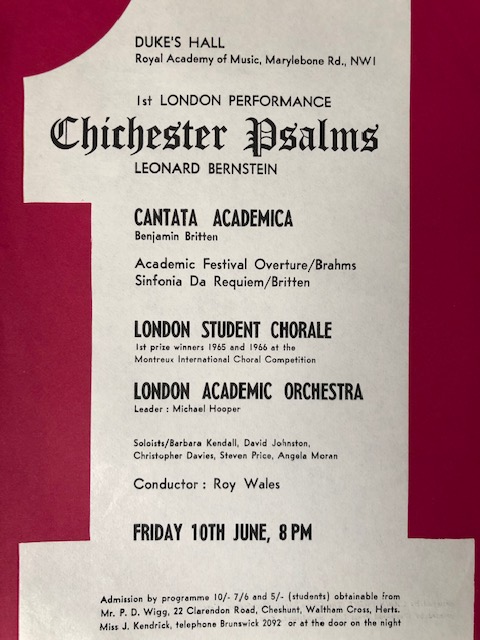
Flyer for the first London Performance of Bernstein's Chichester Psalms, 10 June 1966

== Premieres of works by Paul Patterson ==
Wales worked closely with British composer Paul Patterson over several decades. The London Student Chorale commissioned Patterson's Kyrie for choir and prepared piano, and Wales conducted the World Premiere at St John's Smith Square on 17 March 1972 with the composer at the piano. Kyrie was also performed by the choir and conducted by Wales a month later at the Third International University Choral Festival at the Lincoln Centre in New York. Kyrie was recorded for the BBC in October 1972.

Patterson's companion piece, Gloria, written for Wales and the London Chorale, was premiered on 24 March 1973 at the Royal Albert Hall. Gloria was performed by the same forces again at the Queen Elizabeth Hall on 24 June 1973. Kyrie and Gloria were recorded in September 1975 at Abbey Road Studios for the His Master's Voice label under the title Choral and Organ Works, released in July 1977.

Wales conducted the UK Premiere of Patterson's Requiem in Coventry Cathedral on 21 June 1975, performed by the University of Warwick Choir and Orchestra and London Chorale. The first London Performance followed on 28 June 1975 with the London Mozart Players in the Queen Elizabeth Hall.

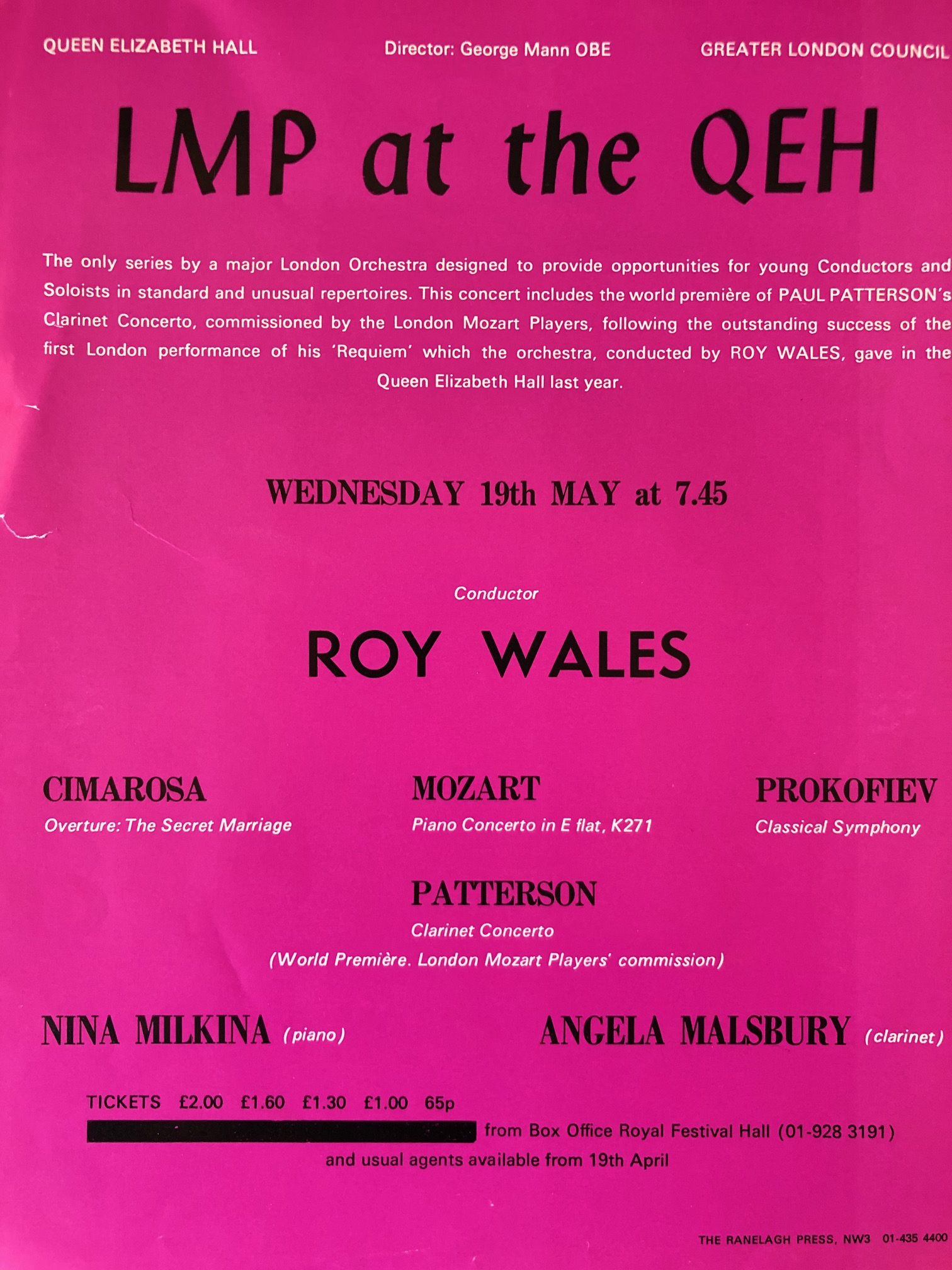
Concert flyer for World Premiere of Paul Patterson's Clarinet Concerto, London Mozart Players, conductor Roy Wales

The London Mozart Players commissioned Patterson's Clarinet Concerto and Wales conducted the World Premiere on 19 May 1976 in the Queen Elizabeth Hall with the LMP and Angela Malsbury, clarinet.

== Premieres of works by other notable composers ==
On 11 November 1965, Wales conducted the Camden Opera Group in the premiere concert performance London Premiere of Aaron Copland's folk opera The Tender Land in Chelsea Town Hall.

Wales conducted the UK Premiere of the one act opera Die Flut (The Tide) by Boris Blacher on 12 May 1966 in St Pancras Town Hall, with Camden Opera Group and Producer Charles Ellis.

On 1 November 1966, Wales conducted the UK Premiere of Laudes Organi by Zoltán Kodály, performed by The London Student Chorale and Malcolm Cottle (Organ) at St Pancras Town Hall.

On 28 November 1966, Wales conducted the Camden Opera Group in the concert/semi-staged UK Premiere of Zoltán Kodály's folk opera Hary Janos in St Pancras Town Hall with a cast including bass Frank Olegario, tenor David Johnston, baritone Michael Rippon and mezzo-soprano Jean Temperley.

For the 1967 Hampstead Festival of the Arts, Wales commissioned and premiered Phyllis Tate's A Secular Requiem on 10 June 1967 in St Peter's Church, Belsize Square, London, performed by the London Student Chorale and London Academic Orchestra. Wales also gave the London Premiere of Tate's choral piece All The World's A Stage as part of a performance at the Queen Elizabeth Hall on 3 June 1980, performed by the London Chorale and English Concert Orchestra.

Wales gave the World Premiere of Stephen Dodgson's The Innocents for unaccompanied choir and soloists, performed by The London Chorale in the Purcell Room on 24 January 1976.

Wales commissioned David Bedford to write Of Beares, Foxes and Many, Many Wonders for The London Chorale, and the World Premiere was given at the Queen Elizabeth Hall on 30 June 1979.

On 8 March 2002, Wales conducted the World Premiere of Michael Stimpson's The Angry Garden, performed by the English Concert Singers & Orchestra at St John's Smith Square London. The piece was recorded in 2019 by the Royal Philharmonic Orchestra and City of London Choir with Hilary Davan Wetton and released in 2021.
