= The Left-Hander (opera) =

Opera by Rodion Shchedrin

- Opera by Rodion Shchedrin
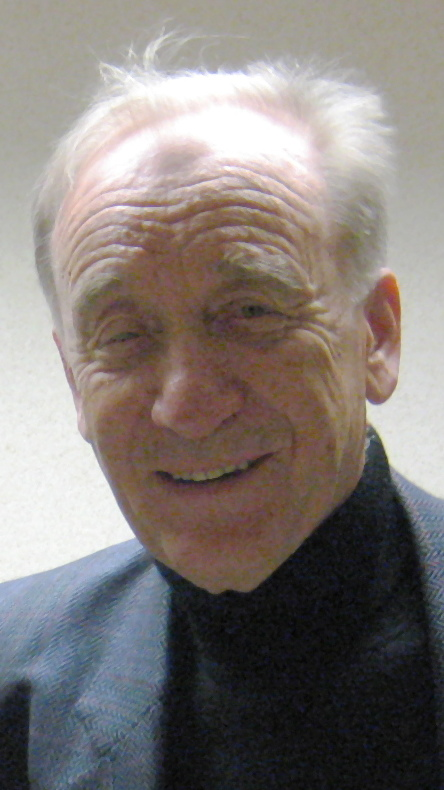
- Shchedrin in 2009
- Native title: Левша
- Librettist: Shchedrin
- Language: Russian
- Based on: Nikolai Leskov's The Tale of Cross-eyed Lefty from Tula and the Steel Flea
- Premiere: 12 July 2013; Mariinsky II, Saint Petersburg

The Left-Hander or Levsha (ru:Левша; The Left-Hander) is an opera in 2 acts by Rodion Shchedrin. The work uses a Russian language libretto by the composer after Nikolai Leskov's The Tale of Cross-eyed Lefty from Tula and the Steel Flea (Russian: Сказ о тульском косом Левше). The work had its world premiere in a concert performance on 26 June 2013, followed by the world stage premiere on 27 July 2013 at the Mariinsky II in St Petersburg. Conductor Valery Gergiev led both performances.

== Plot ==
The action takes place in the early nineteenth century. Tsar Nicolas I admires a tiny dancing flea made of steel by English workmen and given to Nicolas's elder brother Tsar Alexander I. He challenges Russian workmen to create something better. In a flashback the flea is presented to Alexander at Buckingham Palace and its dancing is shown (described in an onomatopoeic orchestral interlude). Back in Nicolas's time, the Left-Hander of the title, a workman, manages to affix minute horseshoes to the English flea; Nicolas is pleased and sends the Left-Hander to England. There he is admiringly interviewed by the Court who try to persuade him to take an English bride, but he refuses. After a tour of English armouries he returns to St Petersburg, his voyage imperilled by a storm and a drunken English “under-skipper”. Arriving drunk himself, he is arrested. He sends a message to the Tsar: the Russian army should stop cleaning their muskets with brick-dust, for the English don't do that, and if war comes between the two nations the Russian guns will be no good. He dies, the Flea sings a lullaby and the opera ends with a burial rite.

== Recording ==
In 2015 a full recording of the opera was released by the Mariinsky Theater with Andrey Popov in the title role, Maria Maksakova as Princess Charlotte, Kristina Alieva as Flea, Edward Tsanga as Platov, Andrei Spekhov as the English sailor, and Vladimir Moroz as both Tsars Alexander I and Nicholas I. Orchestration: 3 flutes, one of them doubling piccolo, or alto flute, 3 oboes, one of them doubling cor anglais, 4 clarinets (III - bass clarinet, and IV - piccolo clarinet in Es), an Armenian duduk, a kazoo, 3 bassoons (III- contrabassoon), 4 French horns, 2 trumpets, 3 trombones, tuba, large percussion set: timpani, snare drum, bass drum, triangle, cymbals, ratchet, guiro, crotales, xylophone, an anvil, bongos, vibraphone, 2 marimbas, ; wind machine, flexatone, wind chimes, bird whistles, zug-flute, ship siren, chocalho, tubular bells, cup-bells; harpsichord, piano, celesta, harp, an accordion; violins I and II, violas, cellos, double basses, 2 domras, a cimbalom (hackbreth).
