= Bruce Tammen =

American conductor (born 1950)

Bruce Tammen (born 14 June 1950) is an American conductor, choir director, and singer.

== Education and career ==
Tammen holds degrees from Luther College, Northwestern University, and the University of Chicago and has taught voice and directed choirs at Luther College, the University of Chicago and area, and the University of Virginia. Tammen studied extensively in France with Dalton Baldwin and Gerard Souzay, and for several years studied with Max van Egmond at Oberlin's Baroque Performance Institute. He has performed several seasons under Helmuth Rilling at the Oregon Bach Festival, and with the Robert Shaw Choral Institute, in Souillac, France. Tammen is baritone soloist on the Telarc/Shaw compact discs Appear and Inspire and Liebeslieder Waltzes. The Chicago Chorale, conducted by Tammen, received the top performance of the year by the Chicago Classical Review with a performance of Rodion Shchedrin's "The Sealed Angel.

Bruce Tammen is married to Esther Menn. They have three sons; Joseph, Elijah, and Daniel Tammen, as well as a daughter Kaia Tammen. He is the uncle of William Carl Geisz and Joseph Kelly Geisz the son of John Geisz.

== Positions held ==
- Chicago Chorale; Conductor
- Virginia Glee Club; Conductor (1996–2001)
- Oregon Bach Festival; Vocalist
- CMAC: The University of Chicago Glee Club; Conductor
