= Jubilant Sykes =

American opera singer (1954–2025)

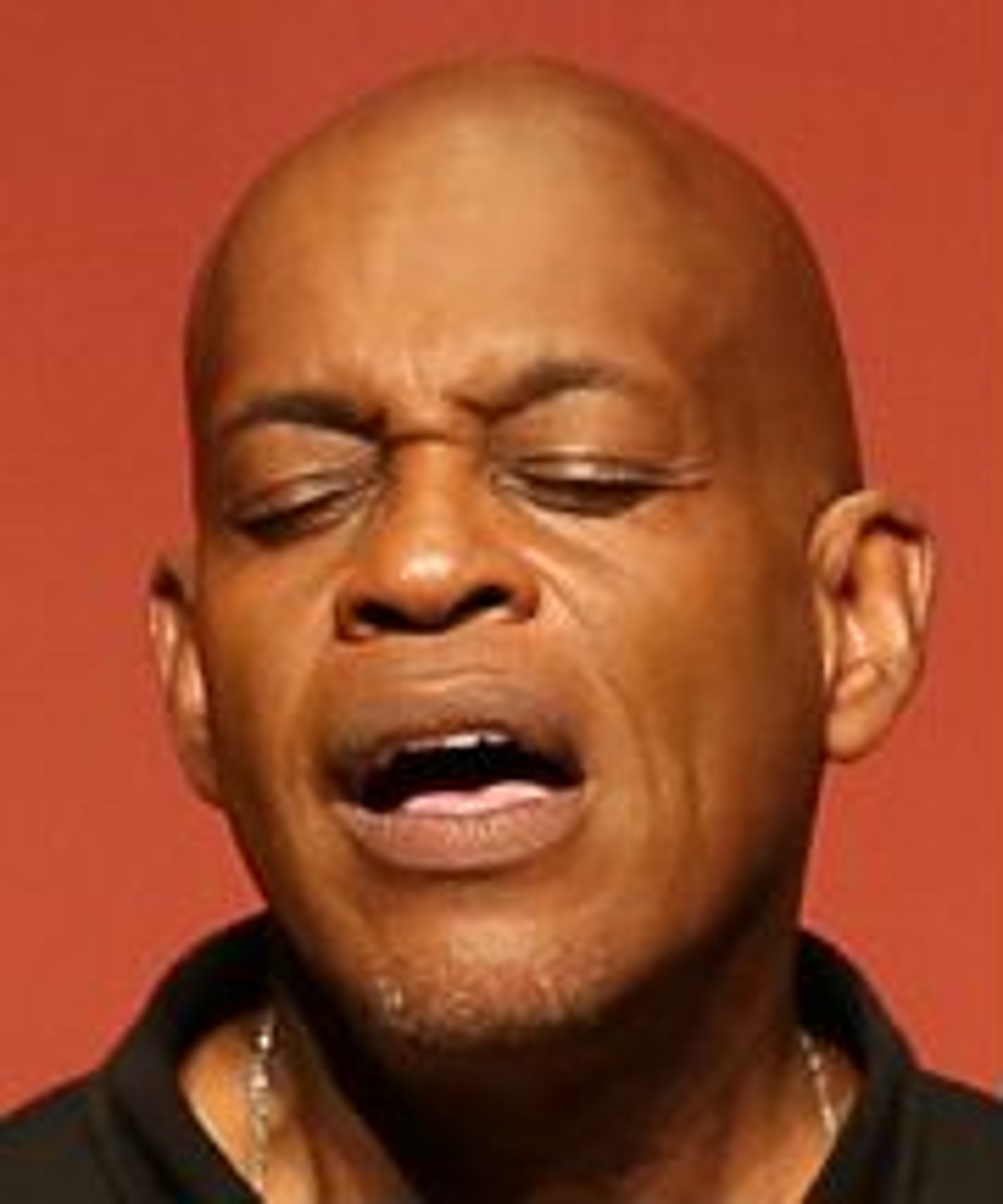
- Sykes in 2019
- Born: Jubilant Roberto Sykes; September 17, 1954; Los Angeles, California, U.S.
- Died: December 8, 2025 (aged 71); Santa Monica, California, U.S.
- Occupation: Baritone
- Children: 3

Jubilant Roberto Sykes (September 17, 1954 – December 8, 2025) was an American baritone singer. He was active internationally on the opera stage, in concert and in musicals, and performed contemporary worship music, African-American spirituals, gospel, funk and pop. A 2008 recording of Leonard Bernstein's Mass, in which Sykes performed the part of the Celebrant, was nominated for a Grammy Award for Best Classical Album.

== Early life ==
Jubilant Roberto Sykes was born in Los Angeles on September 17, 1954, to Robert and Eloise Sykes. He later said that his mother named him Jubilant because she wanted him to become jubilant. Growing up in Los Angeles, he sang soprano as a child and took piano lessons. He lost interest in music when his voice changed, until a teacher nurtured his interest in classical music. Sykes attended California State University, Fullerton, studied voice and graduated in 1979.

== Career ==
From 1978, he worked for the music ministry of Grace Community Church. During his time at Fullerton, a philanthropist noted his musical dedication and donated a European study scholarship. He developed his skills in Austria and Paris. He enrolled as a graduate student at the University of Southern California, where he was cast in a production of Gershwin's Porgy and Bess that toured Europe.

Sykes released a first album, Number of the Lord, in 1981. Robert Darden, a music journalist from New York and a gospel music scholar, noticed his voice of a "rich baritone sound, virtuosity, and control". Besides gospel, he performed contemporary sacred music, funk and African American spirituals.

In 1990, Sykes was cast in his first professional operatic job as Jake in Porgy and Bess with the Houston Grand Opera. This led to concerts with the Minnesota Orchestra. He achieved first place in the regional Metropolitan Opera National Council Auditions followed by his debut at the Metropolitan Opera in New York City in 1990, again as Jake. During this period, he performed a wide range of repertoire of jazz and classical music. His 1994 album Jubilant Sykes Sings Copland and Spirituals contrasted music by Aaron Copland and arrangements of spirituals such as "Go Down, Moses", with the London Symphony Orchestra. He performed contemporary worship music with Keith and Kristyn Getty.

Sykes performed with guitarist Christopher Parkening and other artists, including Julie Andrews, Josh Groban, Carlos Santana, John Williams, and Brian Wilson. He appeared at such venues as the Deutsche Oper Berlin, Carnegie Hall, the Kennedy Center, the Barbican Centre in London, the Apollo Theater, and the Hollywood Bowl. and other major venues around the world. He performed as a soloist with orchestras conducted by Christoph Eschenbach, Raymond Leppard and Lorin Maazel. In the 1990s, he signed with IMG. He appeared in the 2001 City Center Encores! performance of Bloomer Girl as Pompey.

In 2008, he appeared in the role of the Celebrant in a Naxos recording of Leonard Bernstein's Mass; the following year, the recording was nominated for a Grammy Award in the Best Classical Album category. Leslie Wright, a critic for MusicWeb International, favorably compared Sykes to Alan Titus, who had sung the Celebrant in the premiere recording of the Mass. Wright also noted that Sykes, whose voice changed "from beautifully soft singing to crooning, as the text requires", seemed more dramatic and interesting.

Sykes was the artistic advisor for Orchestra Santa Monica.

== Personal life and death ==
Sykes and his wife Cecelia had three sons. They lived in Santa Monica.

Sykes was found dead at his home on December 8, 2025, aged 71. Police arrived and found him injured, with "critical injuries consistent with stabbing". Paramedics pronounced him dead. The Los Angeles Times reported that according to the police, Sykes had been stabbed several times by his son, Micah. Sykes' wife, Cecelia, initially reported the incident as an assault, and told investigators that Micah had a history of mental illness, although according to the Times, investigators had not determined at that point whether this played a role in Sykes' killing. Micah was arrested without incident and charged on suspicion of homicide.

== Filmography ==
=== Film ===
Year	Title	Role	Note
2014	Freedom	Ozias	

== Recordings ==
- Number of the Lord (1981)
- Jubilant (Sony Music, 1998)
- Wait for Me (Sony, 2001)
- Jubilation, with Christopher Parkening (Angel Records, 2007)
- Bernstein: Mass, with Peabody Children's Chorus, Morgan State University choir, Baltimore Symphony Orchestra, Marin Alsop, cond.
- Jubilant Sykes Sings Copland and Other Spirituals (Ariola Records, 2010)

== Accolades ==
Awards	Year	Category	Work	Result	Ref.
Grammy Awards	2010	Best Classical Album	Mass	Nominated	
