= Dead Souls (opera) =

Opera by Rodion Shchedrin

Dead Souls (Мёртвые души) is a 1976 Russian-language opera in three acts by Rodion Shchedrin based on Gogol's novel Dead Souls to a libretto by the composer. It was premiered at the Kirov Theatre in 1977, and overseas in Boston in 1988.

A major revival was premiered at the Bolshoi Theatre in Moscow on 22 November 2025, by the following cast:

- Folk Song (mezzo-sopranos/contraltos in Russian folk style) - soloists of Komon Folk Ensemble
- Pavel Ivanovich Chichikov (baritone) - Vasily Sokolov
- Korobochka (mezzo-soprano) - Elena Manistina
- Sobakevich (bass) - Vladislav Popov
- Plyushkin (mezzo-soprano or character tenor) - Evgenia Segeniuk
- Manilov (lyric tenor) - Tikhon Goryachev
- Madame Lisa Manilova, his wife (lyric-coloratura soprano) - Anna Aglatova
- Selifan, Chichikov's coachman (Russian folk tenor) - Andrey Zorin
- Mizhuev, Nozdryov's brother-in-law (low bass) - Demian Onufrak
- Anna Grigorievna, a pleasant lady in any respect (coloratura soprano) - Ramilya Minikhanova
- Sofia Ivanovna, a merely pleasant lady (coloratura mezzo-soprano) - Daria Belousova
- Governor (bass) - Danil Knyazev
- Governor's wife (contralto) - Irina Berezina
- Governor's daughter (ballerina) - Kristina Latysheva
- Public Prosecutor (baritone) - Andrei Bulgakov
- Chief of police (bass-baritone) - Chingis Bairov
- Postmaster (dramatic tenor) - Alezander Chernov
- President of the local council (tenor)- Zakhar Kovalyov
- Priest (lyric tenor) - Igor Yanulaitis
- Superintendent of Rural Police (baritone-bass) - Andrei Prys
- The Mother's Solgier's Lament (mezzo-soprano) - Svetlana Shilova

["Orchestration" (approximately)] Three flutes, one of them doubling a piccolo or alto flute, two oboes (doubling cor anglais), two clarinets in B, 1 clarinet in A, 1 clarinet piccolo in Es, bass clarinet in B, two bassoons (doubling contrabassoon), four french horns, two trumpets, three trombones, tuba, timpani, snare drum, bass drum, clash cymbals, suspended cymbal, bongos, timbales, crotales, tubular bells, glockenspiel, xylophone, bar chimes, flexatone, small siren ad lib., vibraphone, jingle bells, whip, triangle, gong, wind chimes, harpsichord or prepared piano, celesta, harp, bass guitar, balalaika, small domra, alto domra, small choir (sopranos, altos, tenors & basses- 2 groups of 4 soloists), violas, cellos, double basses.

== Recordings ==
- radio recording – Bolshoi Theatre Chorus and Orchestra, Yevgeny Svetlanov (1976).
- Vinyl and CD – Bolshoi Theatre Chorus and Orchestra, Yuri Temirkanov, 1982 Melodiya: MELCD1001837 – 2 CDs Reviewed in Gramophone Magazine 7/96.
- television recording – Mariinsky Theatre "Golden Mask" Festival (May, 2012)
