= Anna Karenina (1975 film) =

1975 film

- Directed by: Margarita Pilikhina
- Screenplay by: Boris Lvov-Anokhin
- Based on: Anna Karenina; 1878 novel by Leo Tolstoy
- Starring: Maya Plisetskaya; Alexander Godunov; Nina Sorokina; Yuri Vladimirov; Aleksandr Sedov; M. Sedova; Vladimir Tikhonov
- Cinematography: Vladimir Papyan; Margarita Pilikhina
- Music by: Rodion Shchedrin
- Production company: Mosfilm
- Distributed by: Darelcine
- Release date: 1975
- Running time: 81 minutes
- Country: Soviet Union
- Language: Russian

Anna Karenina (Russian: Анна Каренина) is a 1975 Soviet film directed by Margarita Pilikhina. It was first shown at the 1975 Cannes Film Festival where it premiered out of competition.

The film is a Bolshoi Ballet version of Leo Tolstoy's 1878 novel Anna Karenina with choreography by Maya Plisetskaya who also took on the title role.

== Plot ==
Count Vronsky (Alexander Godunov) spots Anna Karenina (Maya Plisetskaya) waiting at a train station. He is immediately taken with her. When the two meet again they cannot deny their attraction and dance passionately together.

== Cast ==
- Maya Plisetskaya as Anna Karenina
- Alexander Godunov as Vronsky
- Nina Sorokina as Kitti
- Yuri Vladimirov as Stantsionnyy Muzhik
- Aleksandr Sedov
- M. Sedova as Betsi
- Vladimir Tikhonov as Karenin
