= The Seagull (ballet) =

Ballet by Rodion Shchedrin

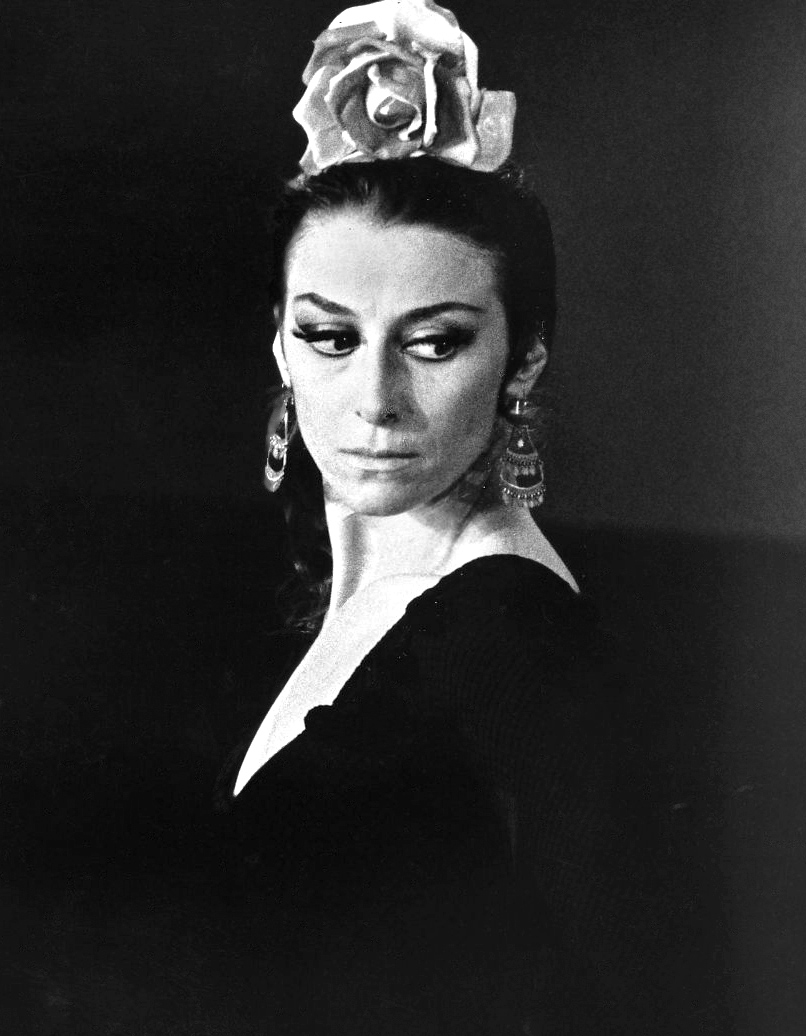
- Maya Plisetskaya in 1974
- Choreographer: Maya Plisetskaya
- Music: Rodion Shchedrin
- Based on: Anton Chekhov's The Seagull
- Premiere: 27 May 1980; Bolshoi Theatre, Moscow

The Seagull is a ballet in two acts by Rodion Shchedrin based on the 1896 play The Seagull of Anton Chekhov. The authors of the libretto: Rodion Shchedrin and Valery Levental. It was composed in 1980 and premiered on 27 May 1980 at the Bolshoi Theatre in Moscow, choreographed by Maya Plisetskaya.

With her experience with the ballet Anna Karenina, Plisetskaya created the choreography and performed the title role. After the premiere, ballet critic Natalia Krymova wrote: "Maya Plisetskaya's role in this performance is fully consistent with the spirit of the play and expresses the diversity of emotions so important to the author. Plisetskaya as a choreographer clearly professes what Treplev says: "new forms are needed." Thus, she breaks the traditional canons of ballet, replacing them with pantomime. Personifying Nina Zarechnaya, she dances only what "flows freely from the soul." Plisetskaya's dance in "The Seagull" can rightly be attributed to these words: "the life of the human spirit." A curious event occurs at the Bolshoi premiere. A woman fell asleep in the audience at the orchestra. She dreams that a gas cylinder explodes in her country house and she screams throughout the hall. Hundreds of spectators stared at her, hanging on their boxes. Everyone on stage froze, but the orchestra continued to play. And she screamed when the sound engineer very resolutely imitated a shot at a seagull.
