= Nikonites =

Russian religious leader

Nikonites, also known as Nikonians, are followers of the main current of the Russian Orthodox Church, which accepted the reforms undertaken during the reign of Patriarch Nikon—as opposed to the Old Believers, who rejected the reforms and maintain strong religious traditions that predate them.
