= Not Love Alone =

1961 opera by Rodion Shchedrin

Not Love Alone (also translated Not for Love Alone or Not Only Love; Russian: Не только любовь, romanized: Ne tol'ko lyubov) is the first opera by Rodion Shchedrin, written 1961, revised in 1971.

Irina Arkhipova created the role of Varvara, and recorded Varvara's aria on her Arias recital for Melodiya 1967.

A well-known piece from this opera (usually played by cello and piano) is the humorous Quadrille from the second Act (Scene 15: The arrival of Varvara Vasilyevna and quadrille).
