= Anna Aglatova =

Russian soprano singer (born 1982)

Anna Khristoforovna Aglatova
- Анна Христофоровна Аглатова
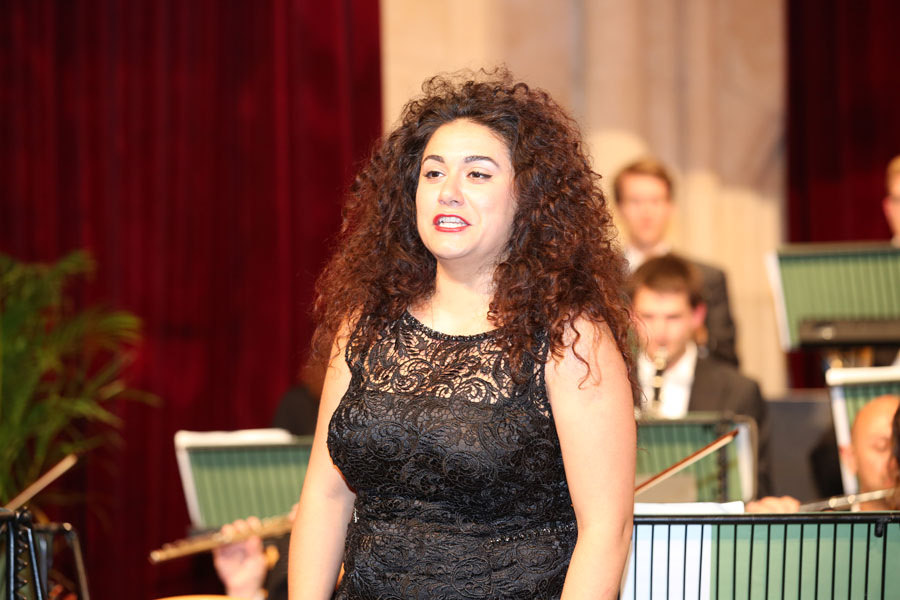
- Anna Aglatova (2014)
- Born: Анна Хачатуровна Асриян; March 4, 1982 (age 43); Kislovodsk, Russian SFSR, Soviet Union
- Education: Gnessin State Musical College
- Occupation: Opera singer (soprano)
- Notable work: Performances at Bolshoi Theatre, Novosibirsk Opera and Ballet Theatre
- Awards: Bella Voce International Competition (2003); All-Russian Festival Winner (2008); Triumph Prize (2009)

Anna Khristoforovna Aglatova (Russian: Анна Христофоровна Аглатова, born as Russian: Анна Хачатуровна Асриян; born 4 March 1982 in Kislovodsk) is a Russian soprano singer.

== Career ==
Aglatova was born in Kislovodsk and by 2004 joined the singing department of the Gnessin State Musical College. Prior to it, she was a recipient of the Sergei Leiferkus grant from the Vladimir Spivakov Fund and in 2005 made her first public appearance at the Bolshoi Theatre. Her career there, have not started with ease since her father didn't want her to work for Bolshoi. In 2003, she was a recipient of the first prize at the Bella voce International Competition and the same year participated at both the Christmas Festival at Düsseldorf and the fourteenth annual Chaliapin Season at Mineralnye Vody. She also was a participant for Irina Arkhipova Fund and was a part of the Novosibirsk Opera and Ballet Theatre. There, in 2006, she sang the role of Susanna at The Marriage of Figaro which was performed at the Moscow International Performance Arts Center and was directed by Tatjana Guerbaca while Teodor Currentzis was its conductor. In 2008 she became an All-Russian Festival winner, and next year became Triumph prize recipient.

== Bolshoi Theatre ==
- Falstaff — Nannetta
- Die Zauberfloete — Pamina and Papagena
- Boris Godunov — Xenia
- Turandot —Liu
- The Queen of Spades — Prilepa
- The Love for Three Oranges — Ninetta
- The Children of Rosenthal — Tanya
- The Legend of the Invisible City of Kitezh — Sirin
- La bohème — Musetta
- Carmen — Micaela
- Die Fledermaus — Adele
- The Tsar's Bride — Marfa
- L'enfant et les sortileges — A widower bat, An owl, A shepherdess Lisa (La sonnambula)
- L'Elisir d'Amore — Adina
- Alcina — main role
- Don Giovanni — Donna Anna
- The Tale of Tsar Saltan — Swan Queen
- Faust — Marguerite
