= Chicago Chorale =

Choral organization in Chicago, Illinois, US

- Origin: Chicago, Illinois
- Genres: Choral, Classical
- Occupation: Mixed Choir
- Instrument: 60 Voices
- Members: Conductor; Bruce Tammen
- Website: www.chicagochorale.org

Chicago Chorale is a choral organization in Chicago, Illinois.

== About ==
Chicago Chorale was formed around 2000.

== Performances ==
Past performances include the Rachmaninoff Vespers (All-Night Vigil, op. 37), Requiems of Herbert Howells, Durufle, Gabriel Faure, Brahms, and Mozart; Frank Martin’s Mass for Double Chorus, Thomas Tallis’ Lamentations of Jeremiah, Handel’s Messiah, Arnold Schoenberg’s Friede auf Erden, and Bach’s St. Matthew Passion, Mass in B Minor, Magnificat, and Christmas Oratorio, which the choir performed both in Chicago and in Mexico City with the Orquesta del Nuevo Mundo. In 2008 the Chorale performed at the Ravinia Festival with the Chicago Symphony Orchestra under the direction of Erich Kunzel, and in 2011 under Ludwig Wicki. Chorale has appeared four times on WFMT (98.7 FM) radio’s “Live with Kerry Frumkin” and recorded six CDs.

== Membership ==
There are approximately 60 performers split evenly into four voice parts. Members pay $125 annual dues. Auditions are held annually. Information on both the current members and auditions for new members can be found on the choir's website.

== Leadership ==
Chicago Chorale's Artistic Director is Bruce Tammen. The group also has a Managing Director (Megan Balderston) and maintains a Board and an Advisory Board.
