= Lolita (opera) =

1994 opera in two acts by Rodion Shchedrin

- Opera by Rodion Shchedrin
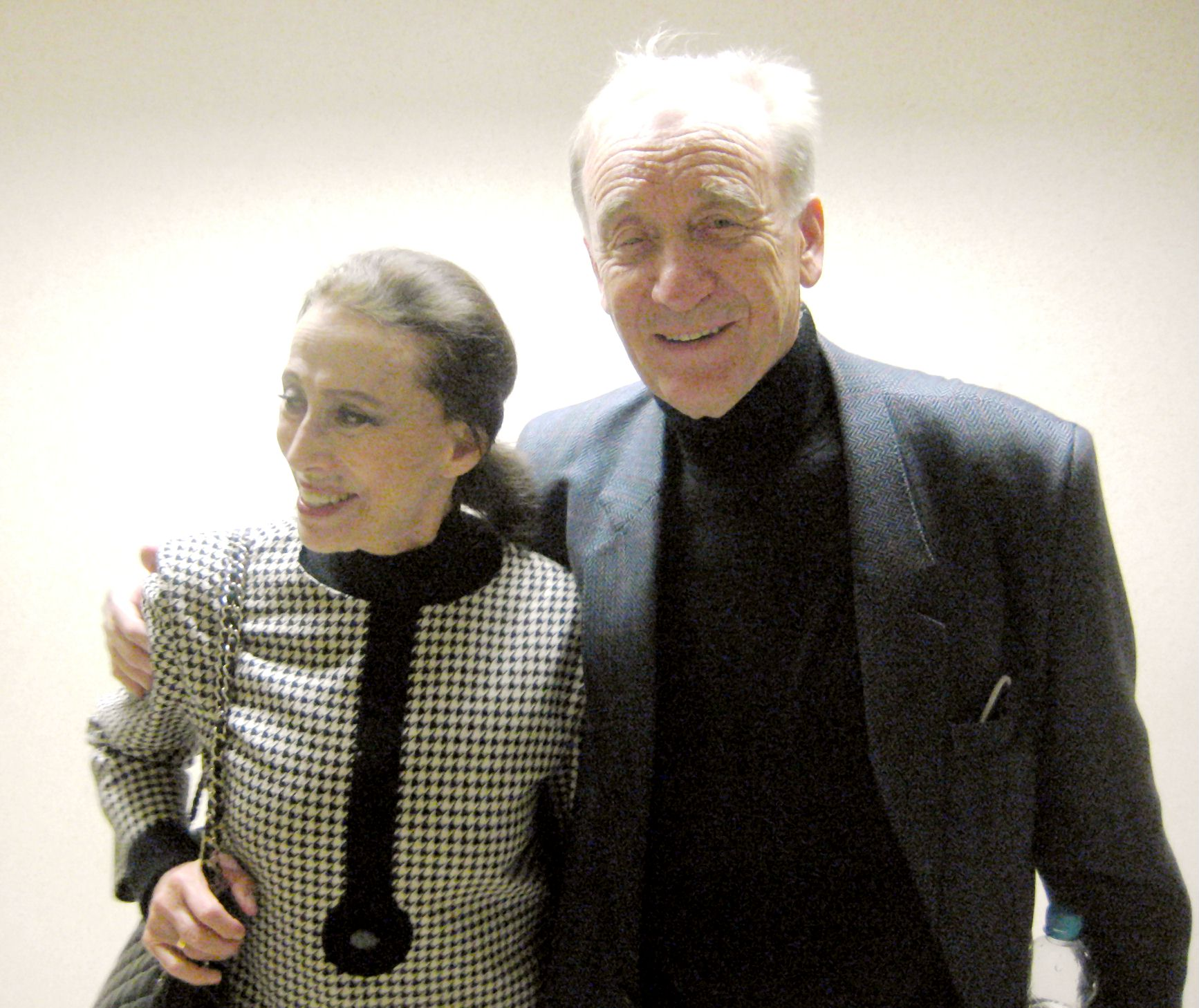
- Rodion Shchedrin, the composer, with his wife, Maya Plisetskaya, in 2009
- Native title: Лолита
- Librettist: Rodion Shchedrin
- Language: Russian
- Based on: Lolita (1955), novel by Vladimir Nabokov
- Premiere: 14 December 1994; Royal Swedish Opera

Lolita (Лолита) is an opera in two acts by composer Rodion Shchedrin. Composed in 1992, it uses a Russian language libretto by the composer which is based on Vladimir Nabokov's 1955 novel of the same name, written in English. The opera premiered in 1994 at the Royal Swedish Opera, Stockholm, using a Swedish language translation of the original libretto.

== Composition history ==
Lolita is Shchedrin's fourth work for the stage based on literary works by Russian writers. He had already been his own librettist in composing a film score and a ballet based on Tolstoy's Anna Karenina (1972), an opera based on Gogol's Dead Souls (1976) and a ballet based on Chekhov's The Seagull (1979). It was followed by Enchanted Wanderer in 2002, based on Nikolai Leskov's 1873 novella The Enchanted Wanderer, and Boyarinya Morozova in 2006, based on texts from The Life of Protopope Avvakum and The Life of Boyarina Morozova.

In 2001 Shchedrin extracted "symphonic fragments" for orchestra from the opera score, which were published as Lolita-Serenade, dedicated to Mariss Jansons.

== Performance history ==
The opera Lolita was commissioned by Mstislav Rostropovich. It was first intended for the Opéra Bastille, the new opera house in Paris, inaugurated in 1989. Instead, it was premiered on 14 December 1994 at the Royal Swedish Opera, staged by Ann-Margret Petterson and conducted by Rostropovich. The performance ran four hours, and was considered well-staged but musically monotonous. Lasse Zilliacus had translated the work into Swedish. The first performance in Russian was on 12 May 2003 at the Perm Opera and Ballet Theatre, conducted by Valery Platonov. It was also given in 2004 in Moscow at the Novaya Opera. The opera was nominated for Russia's Golden Mask award. In 2008 the second act of the opera was performed in concert at St. Petersburg's Mariinsky Theatre, conducted by Valery Gergiev, together with Messiaen's L'ascension and Pierre Boulez's Four Notations, as part of the Second New Horizons festival.

The premiere of a German version in a translation of Ariane Csonka Comstock was given on 30 April 2011 at the opening night of the Internationale Maifestspiele Wiesbaden in a production of the Hessisches Staatstheater Wiesbaden, in the presence of the composer and his wife, Maya Plisetskaya. It was staged by Konstanze Lauterbach, conducted by Wolfgang Ott, with Emma Pearson in the title role and Sébastien Soulès as Humbert. By agreement with the composer, the opera was shortened by a third. A workshop before the premiere, called Opernforum (Opera Forum), introduced the history and music of the work.

Lolita was published by Schott; it is available in Russian, Swedish, English and German. Ariane Comstock translated it to English. The performance time is given as three hours.

== Roles ==
Roles, voice types,premiere cast
Role	Voice type	Premiere cast 14 December 1994 Conductor: Mstislav Rostropovich
Lolita	lyrical coloratura soprano	Lisa Gustafsson
Humbert Humbert	baritone	Per-Arne Wahlgren
Claire Quilty	lyric tenor	Björn Haugan
Charlotte, Lolita's mother	mezzo-soprano	Laila Andersson-Palme

== Synopsis ==
Lolita is the only staged opera after Nabokov's novel, which was written in English in the United States. The story of the "famous and infamous novel" is told by Humbert Humbert, a 37-year-old literary scholar, who becomes obsessed and sexually involved with his landlady's daughter Lolita, who is 12 years old at the beginning of the story. Shchedrin called the novel "a wonderful thriller begging to be transformed into an opera". He commented further: "It feels like a nostalgia for beauty; it is a symbol, really. ... For me personally, Lolita as a character is less of a human being but rather an archetype, a symbol of beauty but a fleeting beauty." He kept most of the plot, but moved the beginning to a court where Humbert is sentenced.

The publisher summarizes: "Humbert Humbert, professor of literature and sophisticate, is obsessed with 12-year-old fatherless Lolita. He seduces the girl and lives with her for some time after marrying pro forma her mother (who dies shortly after). Three years after the end of their increasingly fraught relationship, Humbert meets Lolita again, now married to another man and expecting his baby. Humbert's jealousy, however, is not directed towards Lolita or her husband, but towards the Mephistophelian film director Quilty, who has used Lolita for porn films. Humbert takes bloody revenge on Quilty – and is sentenced to death in the electric chair."

A review of the German premiere has more details: Humbert marries Charlotte, Lolita's mother, to get closer to Lolita. When Charlotte detects Humbert's passion for her daughter, she panics and dies in a car accident. Humbert keeps her death a secret to Lolita and travels with her through the United States. The girl escapes to an affair with Quilty, who abuses her for porn films and is killed by Humbert. Humbert dies in prison; Lolita, again in a new affair, dies giving birth. Lolita's death was in the novel, but originally not in the opera until the German premiere.

== Music ==
The opera is scored for a large orchestra consisting of 4 flutes (3rd doubling alto flute, 4th doubling piccolo), 2 oboes, English horn, 3 clarinets (3rd doubling alto saxophone), 2 bassoons, contrabassoon, 4 horns, 3 trumpets, 3 trombones, bass tuba, a percussion section requiring 3 players (instruments include a.o. glass chimes, siren, wind chimes, tin whistle and xylophone), harp, celesta, harpsichord and strings. In addition to several minor roles, the opera requires a boys' choir and a "choir of judges" who all sing bass.

The music of Lolita-Serenade, which is part of the opera, has been compared to that of Alban Berg's Lulu:

Despite the darkness and violence – Lolita is, after all, the story of a predatory, obsessed, self-deluded murderer and the lost childhood and early death of an orphaned 13-year-old girl – Shchedrin's Lolita Serenade has many moments of affecting tenderness, from the gently intertwining flute tendrils that begin it to the sweetly sad epilogue that ends the piece. The scoring is striking and memorable, especially in the use of spare, unadorned harpsichord figures to impart a sense of fragility and lost innocence. Anyone who (as I do) responds to Berg's Lulu Suite should hear this remarkable composition, which is drawn from the same well.

The opera begins with only flutes and cellos playing, symbolizing the difference in age of the protagonists. The scene opens with Humbert accusing himself at a court. A "choir of judges", all "Russian" basses reminiscent of the chant in the Russian Orthodox Church calls him a "beast".

Shchedrin's music has been termed chamber music for extended parts of the opera, reflecting the psyche of the protagonists with compassion, also some comic characters such as two singing Advertising Girls. In a scene between Humbert and Lolita reminiscent of Carmen, Shchedrin quotes Bizet.

In the end Humbert stammers syllables of Lolita's name against a boys' choir chanting Ora pro nobis (Pray for us).
