= Rodion Shchedrin =

Soviet and Russian composer and pianist (1932–2025)

- Родион Щедрин
- Shchedrin in 2017
- Born: 16 December 1932; Moscow, Russian SFSR, Soviet Union
- Died: 29 August 2025 (aged 92); Munich, Bavaria, Germany
- Occupations: Composer, pianist and music pedagogue
- Works: List of compositions
- Spouse: Maya Plisetskaya (m. 1958; died 2015)
- Awards: USSR State Prize; Lenin Prize; State Prize of the Russian Federation

Rodion Konstantinovich Shchedrin (Russian: Родион Константинович Щедрин, IPA: [rədʲɪˈon kənstɐnʲˈtʲinəvʲɪtɕ ɕːɪˈdrʲin]; 16 December 1932 – 29 August 2025) was a Soviet and Russian composer, pianist, and music teacher. He wrote in a wide range of genres, including operas such as Lolita and The Left-Hander, and ballets such as the Carmen Suite, created for his wife, the ballerina Maya Plisetskaya of the Bolshoi Theatre. His orchestral works includes five concertos for orchestra and six piano concertos, in which he often appeared as soloist. He also composed vocal works such as The Sealed Angel, as well as chamber music and film scores, including Anna Karenina. His works have been widely performed and commissioned internationally, particularly in the United States and Western Europe. Shchedrin is regarded as one of the leading composers of the late Soviet period and an important figure in Russian contemporary music in the decades that followed.

== Life and career ==
Shchedrin was born in Moscow on 16 December 1932, into a musical family: his father was a composer and teacher of music theory, and his grandfather was an Orthodox priest. He was exposed to spiritual independence and critical awareness at an early age. He studied at the Moscow Choral School and Moscow Conservatory, where he studied composition with Yuri Shaporin and piano with Yakov Flier, graduating in 1955.

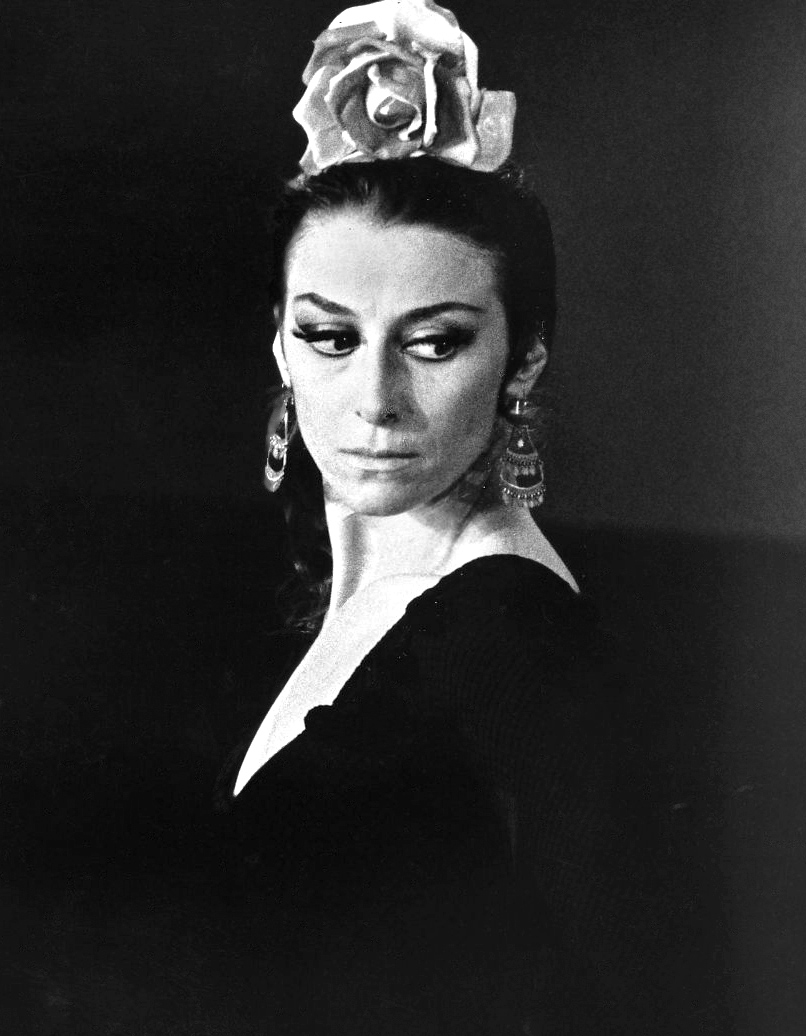
Maya Plisetskaya as Carmen, 1974

Shchedrin's early works are tonal and colourfully orchestrated, often incorporating elements of folk music, while some of his later compositions employed aleatoric and serial techniques. An accomplished pianist and organist, he performed the solo part of his First Piano Concerto in 1954, while still a student, with Gennady Rozhdestvensky conducting. The concerto draws on Russian folklore, combining empathy with ironic detachment. Although a capable performer, he decided early to focus primarily on composition. Among his early works was the ballet The Little Humpbacked Horse, premiered in 1955.

In 1958 Shchedrin married the ballerina Maya Plisetskaya, who later became prima ballerina of the Bolshoi Theatre, and they remained together until her death in 2015. Many of his ballets were written with her in mind, including Carmen Suite (1967), Anna Karenina (1971, based on Tolstoy's novel), and Lady with a Lapdog (1985, after Chekhov's short story). The couple were prominent figures in the cultural life of the Soviet Union, although both were closely monitored by the KGB.

Shchedrin composed his First Symphony in 1958, characterized by "movements in the wrong order" and a tone of "wildness and aggression". His Second Symphony, written between 1962 and 1965, is structured as 25 overlapping preludes, including a double fugue and canon. In 1963 he completed his first Concerto for Orchestra, a single-movement work in which monothematic material is combined with other motifs and variations. Subtitled Naughty Limericks (Osorniye chastushki), the piece achieved success with both audiences and critics, and was later choreographed by George Balanchine. Between 1964 and 1970 Shchedrin composed a cycle of 24 Preludes and Fugues after he heard those of Dmitri Shostakovich, in turn inspired by those of J. S. Bach. He followed this with the Polyphonic Notebook, a collection of 25 piano preludes written in 1972 as homages to earlier music.

Shchedrin taught at the Moscow Conservatory from 1965 to 1969. In his Second Piano Concerto he experimented with Twelve-tone techniques and incorporated elements of jazz. In 1967 he toured Europe with the Leningrad Philharmonic under Yevgeny Mravinsky, performing the work. The following year Leonard Bernstein commissioned his Second Concerto for Orchestra, subtitled Zvony (The Chimes), for the 125th anniversary of the New York Philharmonic. The music evokes the sounds of traditional Russian bells, though without nostalgic intent.

In 1968 Shchedrin refused to sign an open letter approving the invasion of Czechoslovakia by Warsaw Pact. He became president of the Union of Russian Composers in 1973, succeeding Shostakovich who had suggested him for the post. Shchedrin's third Concerto for Orchestra is based on music of Russian provincial circuses. It was premiered in 1989 by the Chicago Symphony Orchestra conducted by Lorin Maazel. The fourth, Khorovody (Round Dances), was written in 1989, and the fifth, Four Russian Songs, was composed in 1998. He used the "phenomenon of notated aleatorics" in his Third Piano Concerto, in 33 variations with a theme at the end. He premiered it on 5 May 1974, playing his earlier concertos the same night, which caused a sensation. The performance with the USSR Symphony Orchestra conducted by Yevgeny Svetlanov was recorded and released on LP and later on CD. Shchedrin wrote his Fourth Piano Concerto in 1991, commissioned by Steinway for the centenary of the company's founding. It is subtitled "sharp keys", and the composer used only sharp keys as his "kind of musical minimalism" but with "timbral effects and thematic variety", as the musicologist Sigrid Neef noted.

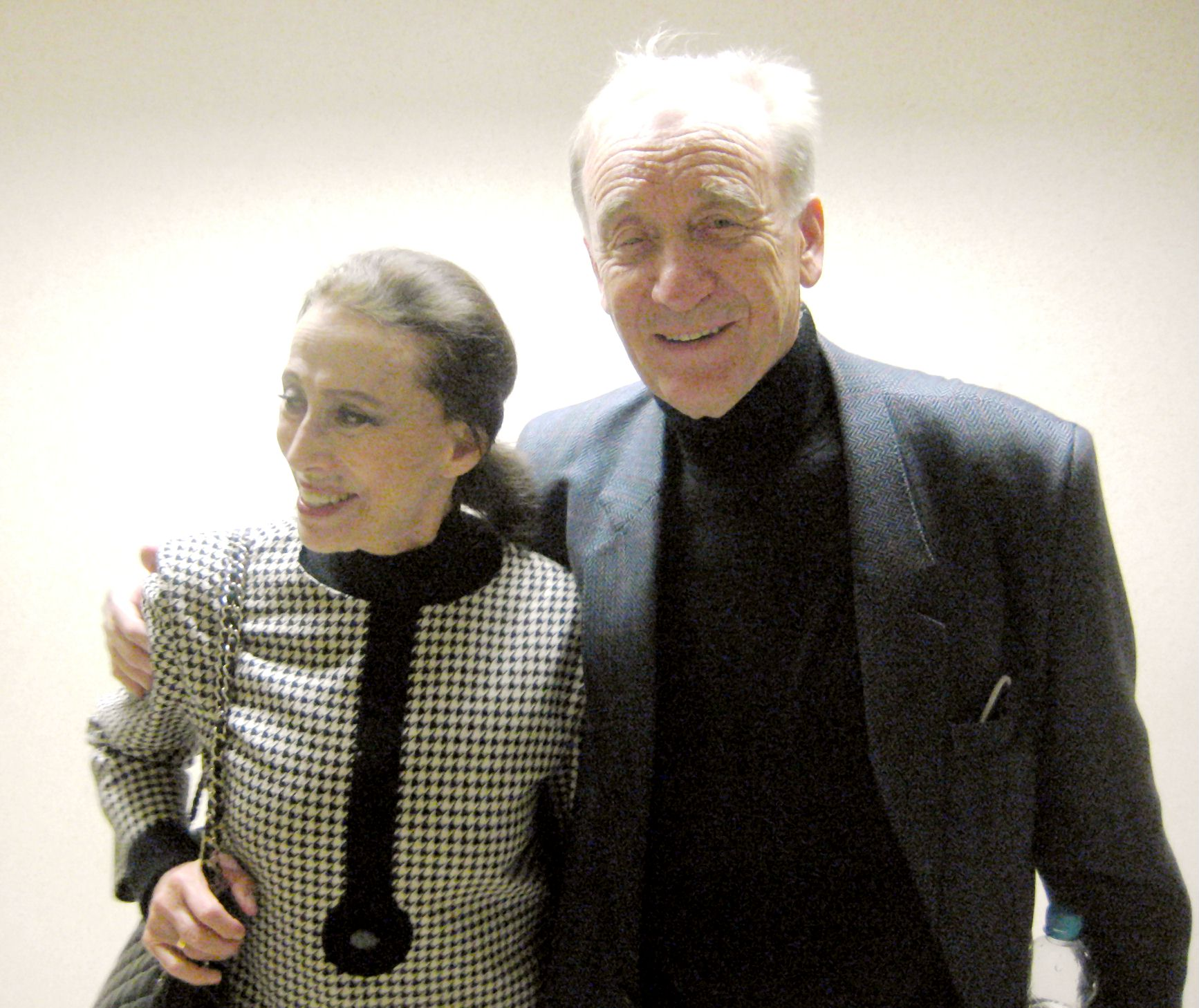
Shchedrin and his wife in 2009

Shchedrin was made a member of the Berlin Academy of Arts in 1989. He worked towards the transformation of the Soviet Union as a member of the Inter-regional Deputies Group, an opposition party inspired by Andrei Sakharov. Following the collapse of the Soviet Union, Shchedrin took advantage of the new opportunities for international travel and musical collaboration, and largely divided his time between Munich and Moscow. He was also a citizen of Lithuania and Spain. He was regarded as one of the leaders of Russian new music during the following decades, while also building a significant reputation in the United States and Western Europe.

Shchedrin's concert opera The Enchanted Wanderer was commissioned by Lorin Maazel for the New York Philharmonic; the composer based his libretto on a story by Nikolai Leskov. It was premiered in New York 2002. A festival of Shchedrin's music was given in Moscow that year on the occasion of his 70th birthday. In June 2008, Shchedrin Days took place in Armenia with the participation of Shchedrin and Maya Plisetskaya as honorary guests. He was invited to the 2009 Rheingau Musik Festival by Walter Fink, as the 19th composer to be featured in the annual Komponistenporträt. He and his wife attended the concerts which included his Russian liturgy The Sealed Angel for choir and flute, performed in Eberbach Abbey. His chamber music included Ancient Melodies of Russian Folk Songs (2007) with the cellist Raphael Wallfisch and himself at the piano, and the song cycle Meine Zeit, mein Raubtier (My Age, my Wild Beast) with tenor Kenneth Tarver and pianist Roland Pöntinen who played it also at the Verbier Festival. His Double Concerto "Romantic Offering" for piano, cello and orchestra was premiered on 9 February 2011 by Martha Argerich and Mischa Maisky with the Luzerner Sinfonieorchester conducted by Neeme Järvi. The premiere of a German version of his opera Lolita was performed as the opening night of the Internationale Maifestspiele Wiesbaden in a production of the Hessisches Staatstheater Wiesbaden in 2011. His dramatic scene Cleopatra i zmeja (Cleopatra and the Serpent) for soprano and orchestra, commissioned by the Salzburg Whitsun Festival, was premiered by Mojca Erdmann and the Mariinsky Theatre Orchestra, conducted by Valery Gergiev, on 28 May 2012.

Shchedrin died in Munich on 29 August 2025, at the age of 92.

== Compositions ==
Shchedrin composed in many genres: stage works, including operas such as Not Love Alone (1961) and Dead Souls (1976, after Nikolai Gogol's novel); ballets; incidental music; orchestral works, including symphonies, concertos for orchestra, and concertos for solo instruments (often piano); chamber music; solo piano works; vocal music for soloists and choirs; arrangements; and film scores.

=== Stage works ===
==== Operas ====
- Not Love Alone (1961)
- Dead Souls (1976)
- Lolita (1993)
- The Enchanted Wanderer (2002)
- Boyarina Morozova (2006)
- The Left-Hander (2013)
- A Christmas Tale (2015)

==== Ballets ====
- The Little Humpbacked Horse (1956)
- Carmen Suite (1967)
- Anna Karenina (1971), ballet after Leo Tolstoy
- The Seagull (1979), ballet after Anton Chekhov's play. First performance in 1980 by the Bolshoi Theatre
- The Lady with the Lapdog (1985), ballet after Chekhov

=== Orchestral works ===
==== Symphonies ====
- Symphony No. 1 (1958) in three parts (1958)
- Symphony No. 2 "Twenty-Five Preludes" (1962–1965).
- Symphony No. 3. Symphony Concertante "Scenes of Russian Fairy Tales" in five parts (2000).

==== Concertos for Orchestra ====
- Concerto for Orchestra No. 1 "Naughty Limericks" (1963)
- Concerto for Orchestra No. 2 "The Chimes" (1968)
- Concerto for Orchestra No. 3 "Old Russian Circus Music" (1989)
- Concerto for Orchestra No. 4 "Round Dances (Khorovody)" (1989)
- Concerto for Orchestra No. 5 "Four Russian Songs" (1998)

==== Concertos for solo instrument with orchestra ====
- Piano
  - Piano Concerto No. 1 in four parts in D major (1954).
  - Piano Concerto No. 2 in three parts (1966).
  - Piano Concerto No. 3 "Variations and Theme" (1973)
  - Piano Concerto No. 4 "Sharp Keys" in two parts (1991)
  - Piano Concerto No. 5 in three parts (1999)
  - Piano Concerto No. 6 "Concerto Lontano" for piano and string orchestra (2003)
- Trumpet Concerto (1994)
- Cello Concerto "sotto voce" (1994)
- Concerto "cantabile" for violin and string orchestra (1997).
- Oboe Concerto (1998)
- Double Concerto "Romantic Offering" for piano, cello and orchestra (2010).

==== Other orchestral works ====
- Self-Portrait, variations (1984).
- Beethoven's Heiligenstädter Testament (2008)
- Symphonic Diptych (2009)
- Lithuanian Saga (2009)

=== Vocal music ===
- Poetoria, concerto for poet accompanied by a woman's voice, mixed chorus and symphony orchestra (1968), to words by Andrei Voznesensky
- Lenin Is Amongst Us, oratorio (1969)
- The Sealed Angel, Russian liturgy for mixed chorus a cappella with shepherd's pipe (1988)
- Meine Zeit, mein Raubtier (My Age, my Wild Beast), song cycle for tenor and piano
- Cleopatra i zmeja (Cleopatra and the Serpent) dramatic scene for soprano and orchestra (2011)

=== Chamber and instrumental works ===
- Musical Offering for organ, three flutes, three bassoons and three trombones (1983). Written for the 300th anniversary of J. S. Bach's birth.

=== Film scores ===
- The Height (1957)
- Anna Karenina (1967)
- Anna Karenina (1975)

== Writings ==
- Shchedrin, Rodion Konstantinovich (2012). Autobiographical Memories. Mainz: Schott. ISBN 978-3-254-08419-4.

== Discography ==
- Symphonic Works (in Russian). Moscow: Melodiya︡. 1990. OCLC 25437053.
- Carmen Suite. Naxos. 1990. OCLC 919567563.
- 24 Preludes and Fugues, Polyphonic Notebook. London: Olympia. 1994. OCLC 32434594.
- The Seagull. Russian Disc. 1995. OCLC 34747616.
- The Sealed Angel: Russian liturgy. BMG Classics. 1996. OCLC 38058871.
- Dead Souls (in Russian). Melodiya︡. 1996. OCLC 35803828.
- Piano Concertos Nos. 1–3. Melodiya︡. 1996. OCLC 38995208.
- Polyphonic Notebook for Piano; 24 Preludes and Fugues for piano. Melodiya︡. 1996. OCLC 37291240.
- Old Russian circus music, Symphony no. 2. Colchester, Essex, England: Chandos. 1997. OCLC 811243951.
- Carmen Suite; Concerto for Orchestra No. 1 "Naughty Limericks"; Concerto for Orchestra No. 2 "The chimes". Hamburg: Deutsche Grammophon. 2001. OCLC 1408585860.
- Boyarina Morozova (in Russian). Mainz: WERGO. 2007. OCLC 1408561173.
- Piano music of Rodion Shchedrin. Baton Rouge: Centaur. 2009. OCLC 437368378.
- The Sealed Angel. Harmonia Mundi. 2009. OCLC 1454952051.
- Naughty Limericks; Not Love Alone; Solemn overture; Piano Concerto No. 2. Melodiya︡. 2009. OCLC 1454940450.
- The Enchanted Wanderer. Mariinsky Theatre. 2010. OCLC 723663435.
- Concertos for Orchestra Nos. 4 and 5. Naxos. 2010. OCLC 1026137949.
- Dead Souls (in Russian). Melodiya︡. 2011. OCLC 1272230640.
- Shchedrin plays Shchedrin. Moscow: Melodiya︡. 2012. OCLC 821263984.
- The Left-hander (in Russian). Mariinsky Theatre. 2014. OCLC 905239536.

== Awards and honors ==
- USSR State Prize (1972)
- People's Artist of the USSR (1981)
- Lenin Prize (1984)
- State Prize of the Russian Federation in Literature and Art in 1992 (25 December 1992) – for the choral music of The Sealed Angel by N. Leskov
- Shostakovich Award (Russia, 1992)
- Crystal Award of the World Economic Forum (Davos, 1995)
- Composer of the Year Pittsburgh Symphony Orchestra (2002)
- Ovation Award (2008)
- Order of Saint Anna, 3rd class (12 February 2010)
- Winner of the German music award Echo Klassik 2008 for the opera Boyarina Morozova (2008)
- Winner of the Russian National Theatre Award "Golden Mask" for the opera The Enchanted Wanderer (2009)
- Grammy Awards
1. Nomination Concerto cantabile (2001)
2. Nomination for the opera The Enchanted Wanderer (2009)
- Order of Honour (2017)
- Russian Federation National Award (2019, for 2018)
- Full Cavalier of the Order "For Merit to the Fatherland":
  - 1st class (2022)
  - 2nd class (3 December 2007) – for outstanding contributions to the development of national music and many years of creative activity
  - 3rd class (2 December 2002) – for outstanding contribution to the development of musical art
  - 4th class (2012)
- Asteroid 4625 Shchedrin

=== Memberships ===
- Corresponding Member of the Bavarian Academy of Fine Arts (1976)
- Honorary member of the GDR Academy of Fine Arts (1983)
- Honorary member of the International Music Council (1985)
- Member of the Berlin Academy of Arts (1989)

=== Honorary academic ===
- Honorary Professor of Moscow Conservatory (1997)
- Honorary Professor of Saint Petersburg Conservatory (2005)
- Honorary Professor of Moscow State University (2007)
- Honorary Professor of Beijing Conservatory (2008)
