= Ratchet =

Ratchet may refer to:

== Devices ==
- Ratchet (device), a mechanical device that allows movement in only one direction
- Ratchet, metonymic name for a socket wrench incorporating a ratcheting device
- Ratchet (instrument), a musical instrument and a warning device

== Film and television ==
- Ratchet (Robots), a character in the film Robots
- Ratchet, a character in the Widget the World Watcher television series
- Ratchet, a character in the Red Lantern Corps DC Comics series
- Ratchet (Transformers), a character
- Ratchet, a 1986 thriller film by John Johnson

== Video games ==
- Ratchet (Ratchet & Clank), a video game character
- Ratchet: Deadlocked, a video game

== Music ==
- “Ratchet (song)” Millionaires (group) featuring Kreayshawn, 2012
- "Ratchet" (Bloc Party song), 2013
- Ratchet (Shamir album), 2015
- Ratchet, another name for the RnBass genre

== Other ==
- Ratchet effect, a concept in sociology and economics
- Ratchet option, a financial derivative also known as cliquet option
- Double Ratchet Algorithm, an algorithm for managing cryptographic keys
- Ratchet (slang), a derogatory term
- Ratchet Gearloose, a Disney character, paternal grandfather of Gyro Gearloose

== See also ==
- Nurse Ratched
- Ratched (TV series)
