= The Enchanted Wanderer (opera) =

Opera by Rodion Shchedrin

The Enchanted Wanderer (Russian: Очарованный странник) is a 2002 Russian-language 'concert opera' by Rodion Shchedrin based on the novel The Enchanted Wanderer by Nikolai Leskov. It was commissioned by the New York Philharmonic for Lorin Maazel and first performed on 19 December 2002 in New York by the New York Philharmonic, New York Choral Artists, and Lorin Maazel. The Russian premiere was in Mariinsky Theatre, Saint Petersburg, in 2007.

== Recordings ==
- Soloists: Sergei Aleksashkin, Kristina Kapustinskaya & Evgeny Akimov Mariinsky Theatre Orchestra & Chorus, Valery Gergiev; recorded in 2008, released in 2010.
