= Anna Karenina (disambiguation) =

Anna Karenina is a novel by Leo Tolstoy.

Anna Karenina may also refer to:

== Film ==
- Anna Karenina (1911 film), a Russian short film
- Anna Karenina (1914 film), a Russian drama film
- Anna Karenina (1915 film), an American film starring Betty Nansen
- Anna Karenina (1918 film), a Hungarian film starring Irén Varsányi
- Anna Karenina (1920 film), a German silent historical film
- Anna Karenina (1935 film), by Clarence Brown starring Greta Garbo and Fredric March
- Anna Karenina (1948 film), by Julien Duvivier starring Vivien Leigh and Ralph Richardson
- Anna Karenina (1953 film), a Soviet historical drama film
- Anna Karenina (1967 film), a Russian film by Alexander Zarkhi
- Anna Karenina (1975 film), a Russian film by Margarita Pilikhina
- Anna Karenina (1997 film), an American film by Bernard Rose and starring Sophie Marceau and Sean Bean
- Anna Karenina (2012 film), a British film by Joe Wright and starring Keira Knightley, Jude Law, and Matthew Macfadyen
  - Anna Karenina (2012 soundtrack)
- Anna Karenina: Vronsky's Story, a 2017 Russian film by Karen Shakhnazerov and starring Yelizaveta Boyarskaya and Maksim Matveyev

== Television ==
- Anna Karenina (1961 film), British TV film starring Sean Connery
- Anna Karenina (1977 TV serial), a BBC serial
- Anna Karenina (1985 film), a telefilm by Simon Langton starring Jacqueline Bisset and Christopher Reeve
- Anna Karenina (1996 TV series), a Filipino television series
- Anna Karenina (2000 TV series), a British series by David Blair
- Anna KareNina (2013 TV series), a Philippine television drama based on the 1996 TV series

== Ballet ==
- Anna Karenina (ballet), by Boris Eifman

== Stage ==
- Anna Karenina (musical), a 1992 musical by Peter Kellogg and Daniel Levine
- Anna Karenina, a 1923 opera by Jenő Hubay
- Anna Karenina (Carlson), a 2007 opera by David Carlson
- Anna Karenina (Hamilton), a 1981 opera by Iain Hamilton

== Other uses ==
- MS Anna Karenina or MS Regina Baltica, a cruiseferry

== See also ==
- Anna Karina (1940–2019), Danish-French film actress, singer and writer
- "Anna Karina" (song)
