= Adaptations of Anna Karenina =

This is a list of adaptations of Anna Karenina, the 1877 novel by Leo Tolstoy.

== Theatre ==
- 1992: Helen Edmundson's adaptation was produced by Shared Experience for a touring production. Edmundson won a Time Out Award for Outstanding Theatrical Event of 1992, and a TMA Award.

== Film ==
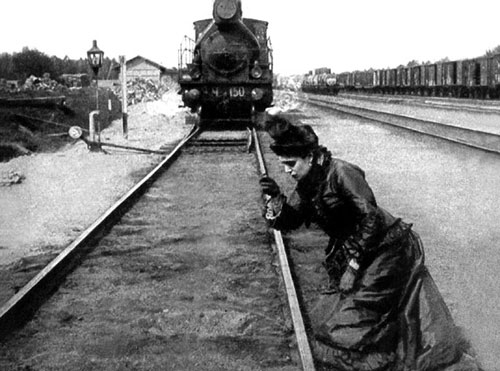
Maria Germanova in Anna Karenina (1914)

Anna Karenina (1920)

- 1911: Anna Karenina (1911 film), a French/Russian adaptation directed by Maurice André Maître.
- 1914: Anna Karenina (1914 film), a Russian adaptation directed by Vladimir Gardin.
- 1915: Anna Karenina (1915 film), an American version starring Danish actress Betty Nansen.
- 1917: "Daughter of Anna Karenina" (Дочь Анны Карениной), by screenwriter, director Alexander Arkatov.
- 1918: Anna Karenina (1918 film), a Hungarian adaptation directed by Márton Garas.
- 1920: Anna Karenina (1920 film), a German silent historical film directed by Frederic Zelnik and starring Lya Mara, Johannes Riemann, and Heinrich Peer.
- 1927: Love (1927 film), an American version, starring Greta Garbo and directed by Edmund Goulding. This version featured significant changes from the novel and had two different endings, with a happy one for American audiences.
- 1935: Anna Karenina (1935 film), an American version starring Greta Garbo and Fredric March and directed by Clarence Brown.
- 1948: Anna Karenina (1948 film) starring Vivien Leigh, Ralph Richardson and directed by Julien Duvivier.
- 1953: Anna Karenina (1953 film), a Russian version directed by Tatyana Lukashevich.
- 1954: Panakkaari, a Tamil language adaptation directed by K. S. Gopalakrishnan
- 1960: Nahr al-Hob (River of Love), an Egyptian movie directed by Ezzel Dine Zulficar
- 1967: Anna Karenina (1967 film), a Russian version directed by Alexander Zarkhi with music by Rodion Shchedrin.
- 1975: Anna Karenina (1975 film), a Russian ballet version directed by Margarita Pilikhina.
- 1985: Anna Karenina (1985 film), a U.S. TV movie starring Jacqueline Bisset and Christopher Reeve, directed by Simon Langton.
- 1997: Anna Karenina (1997 film), the first American version to be filmed entirely on locations in Russia, directed by Bernard Rose and starring Sophie Marceau and Sean Bean.
- 2012: Anna Karenina (2012 film), a British version directed by Joe Wright, starring Keira Knightley.
  - see also Anna Karenina (2012 soundtrack), the soundtrack of the 2012 film

== Television ==
- 1961: Anna Karenina, a BBC Television adaptation directed by Rudolph Cartier, starring Claire Bloom and Sean Connery.
- 1977: Anna Karenina, a ten-episode BBC series, directed by Basil Coleman and starred Nicola Pagett, Eric Porter and Stuart Wilson.
- 2000: Anna Karenina, a four-part British Channel 4 TV adaptation directed by David Blair and starring Helen McCrory. Aired in America on PBS Masterpiece Theatre in 2001.
- 2013: Anna Karenina, an Italian version for the Rai 1 network, directed by Christian Duguay and starring Vittoria Puccini
- 2015: The Beautiful Lie, an Australian mini-series aired on the ABC.
- Upcoming Netflix miniseries is set in 21st century in Russia with Svetlana Khodchenkova in lead role

== Ballet ==
- 1972: Anna Karenina, a ballet with original music by Rodion Shchedrin, choreographed by Maya Plisetskaya (solo scenes) together with Natalya Ryzhenko and Viktor Smirnov-Golovanov (mass scenes). The music draws upon the composer's own score for the 1967 film and uses a fragment from Bellini's I Capuleti e i Montecchi.
- 2005: Anna Karenina, a Russian ballet choreographed by Boris Eifman, with music by Tchaikovsky.
- 2018: Anna Karenina, a ballet by John Neumeier inspired by Leo Tolstoy; music by Tchaikovsky, Alfred Schnittke and Cat Stevens/Yusuf Islam
- 2019: Anna Karenina, choreography by Yuri Possokhov, music by Ilya Demutsky

== Musical theatre ==
- 1992: Anna Karenina, an ill-fated Broadway musical adaptation.
- 1994: Anna Karenina, musical by Hungarian authors Tibor Kocsák (music) and Tibor Miklós (book and lyrics)
- 2016: Anna Karenina, an original Russian-language musical produced by the Moscow Operetta Theatre (live-recording filmed in 2018).

== Opera ==
- 1914: Karenina Anna by Hungarian composer Jenő Hubay, premièred in 1923, to a libretto by Sándor Góth and Andor Gábor based on Edmond Guiraud's play drawn from Tolstoy's novel.
- 1962: Anna Kareninová by Czech composer Emil Hlobil on his own libretto, premièred in České Budějovice in 1963.
- 1970: Anna Karenina by Ukrainian composer Yuly Sergeyevich Meytus.
- 1978: Anna Karenina by Scottish composer Iain Hamilton on his own libretto, premièred by ENO at the London Coliseum in 1981.
- 2007: Anna Karenina, an American opera with music by David Carlson on a libretto by Colin Graham which premiered in 2007 at Florida Grand Opera. Second version with an added scene on text by Mark Streshinsky was premièred in 2010 by Opera San Jose.

== Literature ==
- 2010: Android Karenina, a mashup novel by Ben H. Winters.
- 2017: Tash Hearts Tolstoy, a contemporary novel by Kathryn Ormsbee about a fictional web series adapting the book created by the protagonist.
- 2021: Anna K, a novel by Jenny Lee.
