= An Hour with Chekhov =

1929 film

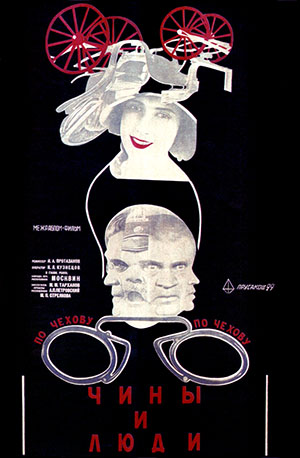
- Directed by: Yakov Protazanov; Mikhail Doller
- Written by: Anton Chekhov; Oleg Leonidov; Yakov Protazanov
- Starring: Mikhail Tarkhanov; Mariya Strelkova; Andrey Petrovsky; N. Shcherbakov; Viktor Stanitsyn; Ivan Moskvin
- Cinematography: Konstantin Kuznetsov
- Release date: 1929
- Running time: 65 minutes
- Country: Soviet Union
- Language: Russian

An Hour with Chekhov (Russian: Чины и люди, romanized: Chini i lyudi, English: Ranks and People) is a 1929 Soviet anthology film directed by Yakov Protazanov and Mikhail Doller based on three short stories written by Anton Chekhov; "Anna on the Neck", "The Death of a Government Clerk", "The Chameleon" and dedicated to the 25th anniversary of his death.

== Plot ==
The first novella of the anthology – "Anna on the Neck" – is the story of Anna Petrovna (Maria Strelkova), who has at a young age become the wife of middle-aged venerable official Modest Alexeyevich (Michael Tarhanov). By marrying, the heroine hopes to be able to financially support her father and brothers, but soon learns that her virtuous spouse does not want to help the drunken relative and his sons. Life in the house of her husband seems dull and monotonous to Anna. The situation changes after a charity ball, where the wife of Modest Alexeyevich causes a sensation. Anna eagerly accepts courtship of the governor, and the wealthy landowner Artynov. At the end of the novella the young woman rides with a suitor in a carriage by her father's house, not realizing that furniture is being removed from the house.

The second part of the anthology – "Death of a Government Clerk" – is an episode from the life of a county court bailiff Chervyakov (Ivan Moskvin), who, when sneezing during a theatrical performance sprays General Bryzgalov (Vladimir Ershov), who is sitting in front of him. He apologizes to the "victim" during the play and then in the intermission, Chervyakov is upset all night because of the embarrassment which has occurred. In the morning he goes to meet Bryzgalov to ask for forgiveness again. The general's words – "What nonsense ... I've already forgotten" (individual lines of the characters are reproduced in the intertitles) do not reduce the suffering of the clerk. After another attempt to explain the indeliberate nature of his act, Chervyakov hears: "Beat it!". Returning home, he lies down on the sofa and dies.

The action of the third story – "Chameleon" takes place in summer on the market. After drinking vodka, artisan Khriukin (Vladimir Popov) tries to play with a small dog. The game ends with him getting his finger bit. The commotion raised by the victim, makes the police inspector Ochumelov and policeman Eldyrin, who happen to be strolling through the area, to start looking for the dog's owner. Attitude to it ranges from anger to tenderness which varies depending on the assumptions heard in the crowd regarding the identity of the owner. After a report that the dog belongs to the brother of General Zhigalov, Ochumelov declares the artisan as the guilty party.

== Production ==
Protazanov, according to film critic Nikolai Lebedev, respectfully treated Chekhov's work. On the eve of the 25th anniversary of the death of Anton Pavlovich, administration of the studio Mezhrabpomfilm offered the film director to adapt several short-stories of the writer; he was granted the right to choose the works himself. The short stories which were included into the anthology were united by the theme of Russian servility and readiness to obey superiors and to recognize any person invested with power as the supreme authority. Common motifs present in three different stories, gave the name of the picture – "Ranks and People". As an epigraph, creators of the film used a phrase from the notebooks of Chekhov: "Russia – land of the bureaucrat".

When working on the script, Yakov Protazanov and Oleg Leonidov took into account that the author's tone, artistic details and lines of Chekhov's characters can not be transferred to film using silent film technology:

Therefore, in some places they had to make changes to the fabric of the stories: the dialogue has been partially replaced with action; the genre of "Death of a Government Clerk" was subject to a transformation (a humorous short story turned into a tragicomic grotesque); in "Anna on the Neck" the emphasis of the story was shifted. But the inner truth of Chekhov and the main character types of the filmed stories have been retained.

— Nikolai Lebedev

== Artistic qualities ==
According to film critic Sergei Lavrentyev, the three novellas included in the anthology exhibit a cluster of fundamental directorial techniques used in cinematic interpretation of literary works. Accordingly, "Anna on the Neck" uses textbook methods of silent film in which the character of the heroine of is created by highlighting small details, and the system of relationships between the characters is revealed with the help of repeated minutiae (slippers which are constantly worn by the husband; eternal detachment in Anna Petrovna's eyes during conversations with Modest Alexeyevich). Film historian Neya Zorkaya when analyzing Protazanov's creation, noted that in the first novella of the film one of the means of expression is "montage featuring a series of isolated individuals": The camera pulls out from a crowd of people to the dazed bride at the time of the wedding, then to the confused brothers, and then to the father holding a glass of vodka.

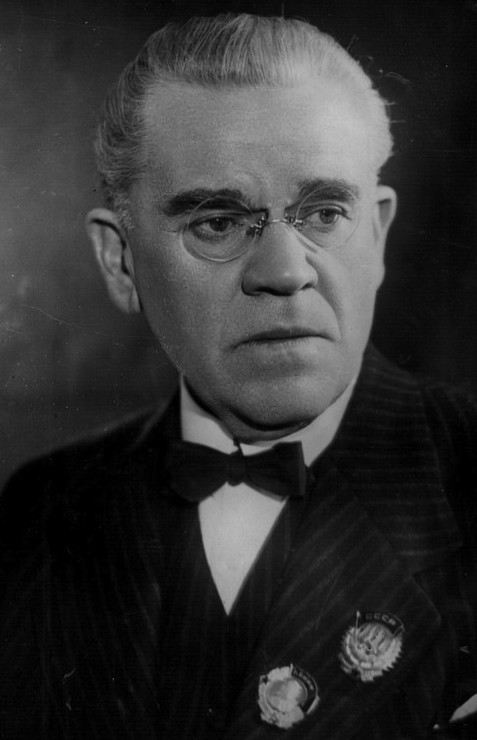
Ivan Moskvin played two roles in the film; Chervyakov and Ochumelov.

In the story "The Death of a Government Clerk", much of which was shot in the realistic tradition, in the finale the director suddenly uses elements of fantasy – they are found in the episode when the General towering over from the colossal table looks down at the small huddled officer; Bryzgalov at this point resembles a giant, Chervyakov (whose imagination spawns the vision) – a "bug".

Film critic Sergey Lavrentyev on the contrary highlights the beginning of "Chameleon": an image of a provincial town wearied from the heat with sleepy inhabitants and a slow rhythm of life largely explains the behavior of artisan Khryukin, who selects a small dog as an object of entertainment. But the scenes with the search for the owner and the inspector Ochumelov whose mood changes by the minute are less cinematic and more theatrical:

The audience gradually sinks into a state similar to the one which the villagers doltish from the heat inhabit, and one comes to the conclusion that for a literalist film adaptation (that is to say, an illustration) sound is the basic requirement. It is necessary to deliver the great texts – what kind of an illustration is it without this!

— Sergey Lavrentyev

== Cast ==
=== Anna on the Neck ===
- Mikhail Tarkhanov as Modest Alekseievitch
- Mariya Strelkova as Anna Petrovna
- Andrey Petrovsky as Governor
- N. Shcherbakov as Anna's father
- Viktor Stanitsyn as Artynov

=== The Death of a Government Clerk ===
- Ivan Moskvin as Cherviakov, the bureaucrat
- Vladimir Yershov as General Brizzhalov

=== The Chameleon ===
- Daniil Vvedenskiy as Kommissar Yeldyrin
- Vladimir Popov as Khriukin
