= The Storm (1933 film) =

- Russian: Гроза
- Directed by: Vladimir Petrov
- Written by: Aleksandr Ostrovskiy (play); Vladimir Petrov
- Starring: Alla Tarasova; Ivan Chuvelyov; Mikhail Tsaryov; Varvara Massalitinova; Irina Zarubina
- Cinematography: Vyacheslav Gordanov
- Music by: Vladimir Shcherbachov
- Production company: Soyuzfilm
- Release date: 1933
- Country: Soviet Union
- Language: Russian

The Storm (Russian: Гроза) is a 1933 Soviet film directed by Vladimir Petrov.

The film is based on play by Alexander Ostrovsky, The Storm.

== Plot ==
The story is set in the first half of the 19th century in the fictional town of Kalinov, located on the Volga River. The main characters are a local self-taught mechanic, Kulygin, who converses with the young people Kudyash and Shapkin about the arrogance of the wealthy merchant Diky. Diky’s nephew, Boris, arrives in Kalinov after the death of his parents, seeking his inheritance from his uncle, but is warned that Diky will not willingly part with the money. Despite his initial struggles with his uncle’s home, Boris begins to become enchanted with the life in Kalinov, while Kulygin tells him about the town’s history and people. Meanwhile, a stranger named Feklusha speaks highly of Kalinov, and the wife of a local man, Varvara, discusses family relations with the beautiful and troubled Kateryna, who reveals her yearning for something beyond her constrained life.

The second act takes place in the house of the Kabans, where the female characters discuss the troubles between Kateryna and her husband, Tikhon. Kateryna’s desire for freedom grows, and with the encouragement of Varvara, she begins an affair with Boris. Varvara plans to arrange secret meetings for them, and the plot begins to develop as Tikhon leaves town. Tensions between the characters reach a climax as Boris and Kateryna meet and succumb to their passion. Meanwhile, the older generation of characters, including the stern Kabaniha, persist in enforcing societal norms, creating a stark contrast to the youth's actions. Kateryna is plagued by guilt and the fear of divine retribution, especially after a visit from a mad woman who warns of impending damnation.

In the final act, the tension culminates in a tragic conclusion. Kateryna, overwhelmed by guilt and the oppressive forces around her, takes her own life by jumping into the Volga River. Tikhon, devastated by his wife’s death, blames his mother for her role in pushing Kateryna to despair. The play ends with Tikhon mourning his wife’s loss, asking why he was left to suffer, while his mother, Kabaniha, coldly denies responsibility. Kulygin, observing the scene, delivers a final judgment on Kateryna's fate, stating that her soul is no longer under the control of her tormentors, but in the hands of a more merciful judge. The tragic fate of Kateryna, as well as the relationships that contributed to her demise, serve as a grim reflection of the societal pressures and moral conflicts of the time.

== Cast ==
- Alla Tarasova as Katerina Petrovna Kabanova
- Ivan Chuvelyov as Tikhon Kabanov, her husband
- Mikhail Tsaryov as Boris Grigoriyevich, her lover
- Varvara Massalitinova as Marfa Ignatovna Kabanova, her mother-in-law
- Irina Zarubina as Barbara Kabanova, her sister-in-law
- Mikhail Zharov as Koudryash
- Yekaterina Korchagina-Aleksandrovskaya as The Old Seer [Script Name: Feklusha]
- Mikhail Tarkhanov as Saveli Prokofiyevich Dikoy

== Awards ==
- 1934: Venice Film Festival (Cup one of the six best films — Vladimir Petrov)
