= Alla Tarasova =

Soviet and Russian actress (1898–1973)

- Алла Тарасова
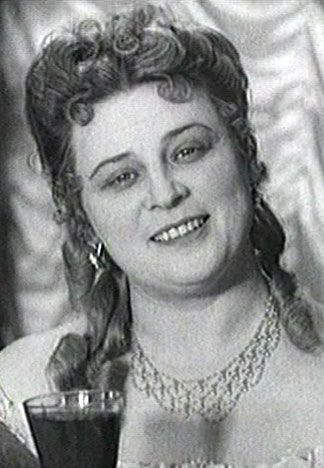
- Born: 6 February [O.S. 25 January] 1898; Kyiv, Russian Empire
- Died: 5 April 1973 (aged 75); Moscow, Russian SFSR, Soviet Union
- Occupations: Actress; pedagogue
- Years active: 1916–1973
- Spouse: Ivan Moskvin (m. 1936–)

Alla Konstantinovna Tarasova (Russian: Алла Константиновна Тарасова; 6 February [O.S. 25 January] 1898 – 5 April 1973) was a Soviet and Russian stage and film actress and pedagogue. She was a leading actress of Konstantin Stanislavski's Moscow Art Theatre from the late 1920s onward. People's Artist of the USSR (1937) and Hero of Socialist Labour (1973).

== Career ==
A title role in Anna Karenina (1937) was her most resounding success. She appeared to mixed reviews as Katerina in the screen version of Ostrovsky's The Storm (1934) and as Catherine I in the movie Peter the Great (1937). Tarasova toured London and United States with the Moscow Art Theatre in 1922–1924 to much international acclaim. She was a recipient of five Stalin Prizes (in 1941, twice in 1946, 1947, and 1949), two Orders of Lenin and the honorary title of People's Artist of the USSR in 1937.

Tarasova joined the Communist Party in 1954, having already been elected to the Supreme Soviet of the Soviet Union in 1952. She served as a deputy of the Supreme Soviet until 1960 and was awarded the title of Hero of Socialist Labour shortly before her death in 1973.

Tarasova died on 5 April 1973 and was interred at the Vvedenskoye Cemetery.

In 1975, a ship, the MV Alla Tarasova, was named after her.

== Filmography ==
- Raskolnikow (1923)
- The Storm (1933)
- Peter the Great (1937)
- Guilty Without Guilt (1945)
- Anna Karenina (1953)
- A Long Happy Life (1966)

== Awards ==
- Stalin Prize first degree (1941, 1946, 1947, 1949)
- Stalin Prize second degree (1946)

== Sources ==
- Solovyova, Inna. 1999. "The Theatre and Socialist Realism, 1929-1953." Trans. Jean Benedetti. In A History of Russian Theatre. Ed. Robert Leach and Victor Borovsky. Cambridge: Cambridge UP. 325–357. ISBN 0-521-43220-0.
