= James Durkin =

James Durkin may refer to:

- James Durkin (actor) (1879–1934), Canadian-born American actor and director
- Jim Durkin (James B. Durkin, born 1961), member of the Illinois House of Representatives
