= Viktor Stanitsyn =

Soviet actor (1897–1976)

- Born: Viktor Yakovlevich Gyoze; 2 May 1897; Yekaterinoslav, Russian Empire
- Died: 24 December 1976 (aged 79); Moscow, Soviet Union
- Occupations: Actor, theater director and pedagogue
- Years active: 1918–1976

Viktor Yakovlevich Stanitsyn (Russian: Ви́ктор Я́ковлевич Стани́цын; 2 May 1897 – 24 December 1976) was a Soviet and Russian stage and film actor, theatre director and pedagogue. People's Artist of the USSR (1948).

== Biography ==
Viktor was born in Yekaterinoslav (current Dnipro).

From 1916 to 1917, he studied at the Imperial Moscow University. In 1918, he entered the Second Studio of Moscow Art Theatre, where he started acting on stage.

From 1946 to 1976, he taught acting at the Moscow Art Theatre School. He became a member of the Communist Party in 1954.

He died in Moscow at the age of 79, and was buried at the Vvedenskoye Cemetery.

== Filmography ==
- An Hour with Chekhov (1929) as Artynov (segment "Anna on the Neck")
- The Four Visits of Samuel Wolfe (1934) as Bill Steiner
- Dawn of Paris (1936) as Karl Shtaiper, commander of Internationalist Battalion
- Guilty Without Guilt (1945) as Nil Stratonych Dudukin
- The Third Blow (1948) as Fyodor Tolbukhin
- The Battle of Stalingrad (1949) as Winston Churchill / Fyodor Tolbukhin
- They Have a Motherland (1949) as Colonel Barkley
- The Fall of Berlin (1950) as Winston Churchill
- The Lights of Baku (1950) as Winston Churchill
- The Unforgettable Year 1919 (1951) as Winston Churchill
- Anna Karenina (1953) as Prince Stepan Arkadyevich Oblonsky
- Dead Souls (1960) as Governor
- War and Peace (1965–1967) as Ilya Andreyevich Rostov

== Awards and honours ==
- Honored Artist of the RSFSR (1933)
- Order of the Badge of Honour (1937)
- People's Artist of the RSFSR (1938)
- Medal "For the Defence of Moscow" (1946)
- Medal "For Valiant Labour in the Great Patriotic War 1941–1945" (1946)
- Four Stalin Prizes (1947; 1949; 1951; 1952)
- Medal "In Commemoration of the 800th Anniversary of Moscow" (1948)
- People's Artist of the USSR (1948)
- Two Orders of the Red Banner of Labour (1957; 1971)
- Stanislavsky State Prize of the RSFSR (1974)

== Bibliography ==
- Riley, John. Dmitri Shostakovich: A Life in Film. Tauris, 2005.
