= Peter the Great (1937 film) =

1937 film by Vladimir Petrov

- Official movie poster
- Directed by: Vladimir Petrov
- Written by: Vladimir Petrov; Aleksey Tolstoy; Nikolay Leshchenko
- Starring: Nikolay Simonov; Nikolai Cherkasov; Alla Tarasova; Mikhail Zharov; Viktor Dobrovolsky
- Cinematography: Vyacheslav Gordanov; Vladimir Yakovlev
- Edited by: N. Kerstens
- Music by: Vladimir Shcherbachov
- Production company: Lenfilm
- Release dates: 1937 (Part 1); 1938 (Part 2)
- Running time: 96 min./96 min.
- Country: Soviet Union
- Language: Russian

The full film, containing both parts

Peter the Great (Russian: Пётр Первый, romanized: Pyotr pervyy) is a 1937-1938 Soviet two-part historical biographical film, shot on the Order of Lenin from Leningrad film studio Lenfilm director Vladimir Petrov on the eponymous play Aleksey Nikolayevich Tolstoy, devoted to the life and activity of the Russian Emperor Peter I.

== Plot ==
The historical film chronicles the life and state-building efforts of Peter I, the reformer and ruler of 18th-century Russia, focusing on the period from the Battle of Narva in 1700 to Peter's proclamation as Emperor in 1721.

The story begins in 1700, with Tsar Peter and his trusted ally, Alexander Menshikov, arriving in Veliky Novgorod after the Russian defeat at Narva. Peter reprimands his son, Alexei, for neglecting to fortify the city and later admits to Menshikov that the "Narva fiasco" has taught him a crucial lesson. Meanwhile, Menshikov hints to a serf named Fedka about the opportunities in the Russian army. As Peter begins forming a new army, he successfully leads the siege of Marienburg, capturing the town. Among the prisoners is Catherine, a pastor's ward and wife of a Swedish dragoon, who becomes Menshikov's lover and later Peter's consort and wife.

Peter establishes the city of Saint Petersburg, reflecting his ambition for modernization, while his relationship with Catherine deepens. Discontented with his father’s reforms and shocked by the birth of Peter’s child with Catherine, Alexei flees to Europe with his mistress, Euphrosyne. Meanwhile, Fedka, who had served in the Marienburg campaign, is sold to the Ural industrialist Nikita Demidov but later escapes to the Don after enduring harsh treatment.

In 1709, the climactic Battle of Poltava occurs, where Peter's forces decisively defeat Charles XII of Sweden. Despite Ivan Mazepa's suggestion to assassinate Peter, Charles refuses. Later, Peter visits Berlin, where he meets Frederick William I of Prussia and the philosopher Leibniz. Back in Russia, Demidov’s oppressive practices lead to the brutal treatment of serfs, but Fedka survives and joins the Don Cossacks. Meanwhile, Peter admonishes Menshikov for corruption and learns of Alexei’s whereabouts from Count Peter Tolstoy.

Peter brings Alexei back to Russia, using Euphrosyne’s cooperation, but Alexei's actions—calling for rebellion against his father—lead to his arrest and trial. The film portrays Alexei's imprisonment and eventual sentencing by the Senate, with Peter tacitly approving the verdict.

The film concludes with the triumph of the Great Northern War, culminating in the Russian victory at the Battle of Grengam and the celebration of peace treaties. In a grand ceremony, Peter declares his new title as Emperor, marking the dawn of a new era for Russia.

== Cast ==
- Nikolai Simonov as Tsar Pyotr I
- Mikhail Zharov as Alexander Danilovich Menshikov
- Nikolay Cherkasov as Prince Alexei
- Mikhail Tarkhanov as Field Marshal Boris Sheremetev
- Viktor Dobrovolsky as Yaguzhinsky, an officer / Fedka, a debtor
- Alla Tarasova as Catherine, a peasant girl
- Konstantin Gibshman as Buinosov, the boyar
- Nikolai Orlov as Yemov
- Fyodor Bogdanov as Foundry Owner
- Vladimir Gardin as Pyotr Andreyevich Tolstoy

== Awards ==
- Prize at an exhibition in Paris (1937)
- Stalin Prize (1941) I Class – Mikhail Zharov, Vladimir Petrov, Nikolay Simonov
