= Guilty Without Guilt =

- Russian: Без вины виноватые
- Directed by: Vladimir Petrov
- Written by: Vladimir Petrov; Aleksandr Ostrovskiy (play)
- Starring: Alla Tarasova; Viktor Stanitsyn; Boris Livanov; Olga Vikland; Vladimir Druzhnikov
- Cinematography: Vladimir Yakovlev
- Music by: Nikolai Kryukov
- Release date: 1945
- Country: Soviet Union

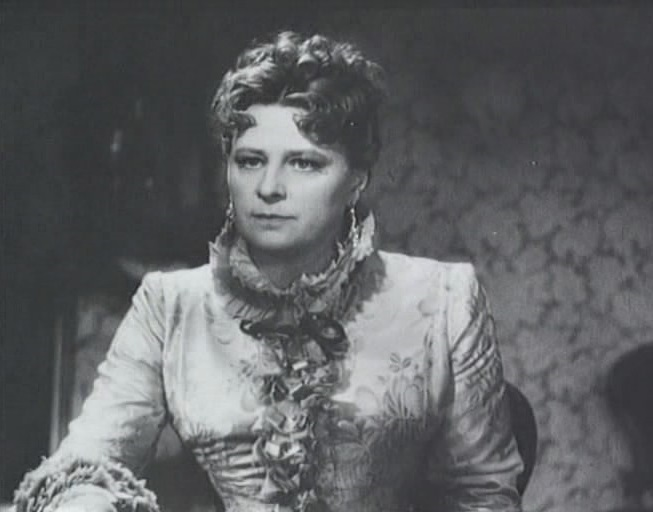
Alla Tarasova in Guilty Without Guilt

Guilty Without Guilt, (Russian: Без вины виноватые, Bez viny vinovatye) is a 1945 Soviet drama film directed by Vladimir Petrov.

== Plot ==
A famous actress, Kruchinina, graciously agrees to go on tour in a provincial town that holds painful memories for her. There, she unexpectedly finds the son she was forced to abandon many years ago. Hardened by a difficult childhood and youth, he has become a minor actor in the local theater and, like everyone around him, a habitual drinker.

== Cast ==
- Alla Tarasova as Elena Ivanovna Kruchinina (as A. K. Tarasova)
- Viktor Stanitsyn as Nil Stratonych Dudukin (as V. Ya. Stanitsin)
- Boris Livanov as Grigoriy Lvovich Murov (as B. N. Livanov)
- Olga Vikland as Nina Pavlovna Korinkina (as O. A. Vikland)
- Vladimir Druzhnikov as Grigoriy Neznamov (as V. V. Druzhnikov)
- Aleksey Gribov as Shmaga (as A. N. Gribov)
- Pavel Massalsky as Petya Milovzorov (as P. V. Massalskiy)
- Sofya Khalyutina as Arina Galchikha (as S. V. Khalyutina)
- Nikolai Konovalov as Theatre impresario (as N. L. Konovalov)
- Boris Shukhmin as Assistant director (as B. N. Shukhmin)
- Sofya Garrel as Shelavina (uncredited)
