= The Celebrated Scandal =

1915 film directed by James Durkin

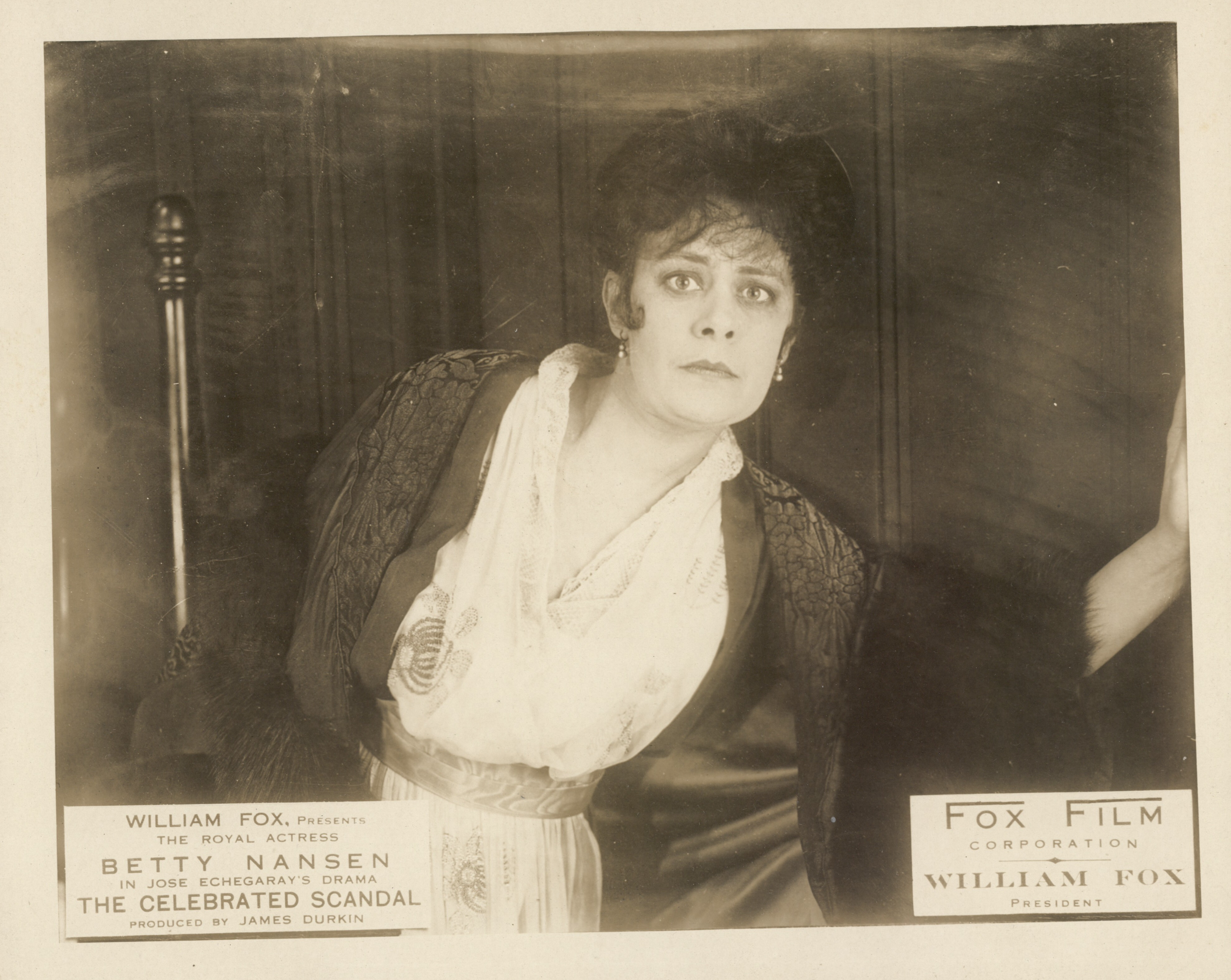
- Lobby card
- Directed by: James Durkin (ass't David Thompson)
- Written by: Elaine S. Carrington (*as Elaine Stern)
- Based on: 1881 play El gran galeoto by José Echegaray y Eizaguirre
- Produced by: William Fox
- Starring: Betty Nansen
- Distributed by: Fox Film Corporation
- Release date: February 11, 1915
- Running time: 5 reels
- Country: USA
- Language: Silent..English intertitles

The Celebrated Scandal is a lost 1915 silent film feature directed by James Durkin and starring Betty Nansen. Although the film's copyright registration states that J. Gordon Edwards "picturized" the film, the opinion of film historians, including the American Film Institute, is that while Edwards may have worked on a discarded earlier version, he did not contribute to the picture as released. The Celebrated Scandal was produced and distributed by the Fox Film Corporation.

== Plot ==
Julian's old friend, who saved him financially when he was desperate, has died. Julian takes in his son, a man in his early twenties named Ernesto, to provide a home for him while Ernesto finds his start in life. Julian and his 20-year-old wife, Theodora, become very fond of Ernesto, feeling like he is a family member. However, the rest of the community looks down on Ernesto and assumes that he and Theodora are having an affair, though Theodora is very happy with her older husband. Julian's brother and sister-in-law, Severo and Mercedes, believe the gossip. Mercedes first approaches and accuses Theodora and Ernesto, who deny the accusations. Severo tells Julian. At first Julian repudiates the lies, but under the continual pressure of accusation, he begins to misinterpret the pair's behavior until he comes to believe they've betrayed him despite their continual, unwavering denials. The emotional shock and stress, as well as the ruin caused by the community's disapproval, undermine his health. Severo's and Mercedes' continual condemnation of Theodora alienates Julian from her and she's denied access to him, even as he dies. With his death, Theodora would be alone in a community that shuns her, so Ernesto tells Severo that the gossips have created what had not existed before; a bond between him and Theodora. He will take her to another city and begin a new life with her there, even if it is in poverty.

== Cast ==
- Betty Nansen - Teodora
- Edward José - Don Julian
- Walter Hitchcock - Don Severo
- Stuart Holmes - Alvarez
- Wilmuth Merkyl - Ernesto (*as John Merkyl)
- Helen Robertson - Mercedes

== See also ==
- List of Fox Film films
- 1937 Fox vault fire
- The World and His Wife (1920)
- Lovers (1927)
