= Dead Souls (1960 film) =

- Directed by: Leonid Trauberg
- Written by: Nikolai Gogol; Leonid Trauberg
- Starring: Vladimir Belokurov; Viktor Stanitsyn; Boris Livanov; Alexey Gribov; Anastasia Zuyeva
- Cinematography: Konstantin Brovin
- Edited by: Tatyana Likhachyova
- Music by: Vladimir Rubin
- Production company: Mosfilm
- Release date: 1960
- Running time: 104 minutes
- Country: Soviet Union
- Language: Russian

Dead Souls (Russian: Мёртвые души, romanized: Myortvye dushi) is a 1960 Soviet comedy-drama film directed by Leonid Trauberg based on the Moscow Art Theatre's stage production of "Dead Souls".

== Cast ==
- Vladimir Belokurov - Chichikov
- Viktor Stanitsyn - Governor
- Boris Livanov - Nozdryov
- Alexey Gribov - Sobakevich
- Anastasia Zuyeva - Korobochka
- Boris Petker - Plyushkin
- Yuri Leonidov - Manilov
- Sophia Garrel - governor
- Alexey Zhiltsov - Alexei Ivanovich, Chief of Police
- Mikhail Yanshin - Ivan Andreevich, postmaster
- Sergei Kalinin - Selifan, Chichikov's coachman
- Olga Wicklund - Anna, a lady agreeable in all respects
- Lyudmila Makarova - Sophia Ivanovna, simply a nice lady
- Victoria Radunskaya - the governor's daughter
- Nina Agapova - lady at the ball (uncredited)
- Yuri Nikulin - Waiter (uncredited)
