= Shopworn =

1932 film

- Theatrical release poster
- Directed by: Nick Grinde
- Screenplay by: Jo Swerling; Robert Riskin
- Story by: Sarah Y. Mason
- Produced by: Harry Cohn
- Starring: Barbara Stanwyck; Regis Toomey
- Cinematography: Joseph Walker
- Edited by: Gene Havlick
- Production company: Columbia Pictures
- Distributed by: Columbia Pictures
- Release date: March 25, 1932 (US)
- Running time: 72 minutes; 65 minutes (reissue)
- Country: United States
- Language: English

Shopworn is a 1932 American pre-Code romantic drama film directed by Nick Grinde and starring Barbara Stanwyck and Regis Toomey. Written by Jo Swerling and Robert Riskin, based on a story by Sarah Y. Mason, the film is about a poor hardworking waitress who meets and falls in love with a wealthy college student. His mother objects to the union and has the waitress framed as a sex worker. After serving her time, the waitress enters show business and becomes a star.

== Plot ==
Waitress Kitty Lane and wealthy David Livingston fall in love. However, his overly protective mother Helen does not approve and does everything she can to break them up. She has her friend Judge Forbes first try bribery; when that fails, he arranges to have her jailed on a bogus morals charge. Meanwhile, Mrs. Livingston convinces her son that Kitty took the $5000 bribe.

As the years pass, Kitty becomes a successful showgirl, with numerous admirers, while David is a doctor. When their paths cross again, their love is rekindled, though Kitty is skeptical of David's resolve in the face of his mother's unwavering opposition. David finally convinces her to marry him.

Alarmed, Mrs. Livingston goes to see Kitty. She begs her to break off the engagement, fearing her son's career will be ruined, but Kitty is unmoved. In desperation, the distraught mother pulls out a gun. Kitty manages to take it away from the confused woman, but is touched by her pleas. When David shows up, Mrs. Livingston hides in the other room while Kitty puts on an act, pretending that she only agreed to marry him to get back at his mother. David is finally convinced, but then a repentant Mrs. Livingston stops him from leaving and confesses the truth, telling him that Kitty is the finest girl she has ever met. David goes to see Kitty weeping in the other room. They embrace and engage in a passionate kiss.

== Cast ==
- Barbara Stanwyck as Kitty Lane
- Regis Toomey as David Livingston
- ZaSu Pitts as Aunt Dot
- Lucien Littlefield as Fred
- Clara Blandick as Mrs. Helen Livingston
- Robert Alden as Toby
- Oscar Apfel as Judge Forbes
- Maude Turner Gordon as Mrs. Thorne
- Albert Conti as Andre
- James Durkin as District Attorney
- Wallis Clark as Mr. Dean (uncredited)
- Edwin Maxwell as Bierbauer (uncredited)
- Tom London as Pa Lane (uncredited)
- Harry Tenbrook as Workman (uncredited)

== Critical response ==
In his review for The New York Times, Mordaunt Hall wrote that despite the performances of the actors, the film was "tedious":

It is beyond the powers of such capable players as Barbara Stanwyck, Regis Toomey, Clara Blandick and Zassu [sic] Pitts to make their actions in this film convincing or even mildly interesting. In fact, none of the persons involved succeeds in enlisting either sympathy or dislike.
