= Tash Hearts Tolstoy =

2017 novel by Kathryn Ormsbee

- First edition cover
- Author: Kathryn Ormsbee
- Publisher: Simon & Schuster
- Publication date: June 6, 2017
- ISBN: 978-1481489331

Tash Hearts Tolstoy is a 2017 young adult novel by Kathryn Ormsbee. It follows a teen web creator who deals with a sudden rise to fame when her Anna Karenina-inspired web series is nominated for an award.

== Plot ==
Alongside her friend Jacklyn, teenage Leo Tolstoy fan Natasha "Tash" Zelenka creates the web video series Unhappy Families, an adaption of Anna Karenina set in the present day. After a popular web creator recommends the show, Unhappy Families rapidly rises in popularity and ends up being nominated for the Golden Tuba award, which is considered one of the highest honors for a web series. Tash is left to grapple with her sudden fame, changing family dynamics with her sister wanting to leave the series and her parents preparing for a new baby, and her feelings for both Jacklyn's brother Paul and vlogger and fellow Golden Tuba nominee Thom, as well as her concerns over how they would react to her asexuality.

== Reception ==
School Library Journal, Booklist, and Kirkus Reviews all gave Tash Hearts Tolstoy starred reviews. Kirkus Reviews noted the diverse representation of various sexualities among the characters, giving particular attention to the "nuanced, trailblazing depiction of a protagonist who identifies as romantic asexual," and described the main cast as "whip-smart, funny, flawed, and compassionate."

Publishers Weekly, while arguing that the book was "close to feeling overstuffed with issues," positively commented on Tash's layered portrayal and voice, concluding that the book provided a "compassionate and frank look into challenges that can seem to fly at teenagers from all directions." Alex Henderson of Aze wrote about the book's handling of asexuality, noting that despite Tash facing acephobic comments from Thom, the story showed he was wrong with Paul being accepting and understanding her. Of the ending, Henderson said it "provides the kind of delightfully sappy and satisfying conclusion awarded to straight romances in YA literature all the time."

The book was nominated for the 2018 edition of Quick Picks for Reluctant Young Adult Readers by the Young Adult Library Services Association.
