= Edward José =

Belgian film director

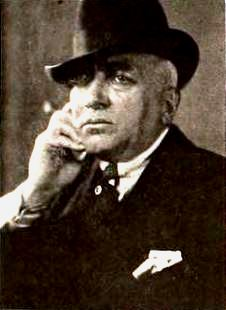
- José in 1920
- Born: 5 July 1865; Rotterdam, Netherlands
- Died: 18 December 1930 (aged 65); Nice, France
- Occupations: Film director, actor
- Years active: 1910-1925

Edward José (5 July 1865 – 18 December 1930) was a Belgian film director and actor of the silent era. He directed 42 films between 1915 and 1925. He also performed in 12 films between 1910 and 1916.

== Selected filmography ==
- The Stain (1914)
- The Perils of Pauline (1914)
- A Fool There Was (1915)
- The Celebrated Scandal (1915)
- Anna Karenina (1915)
- A Woman's Resurrection (1915)
- The Beloved Vagabond (1915)
- The Iron Claw (1916)
- Ashes of Embers (1916)
- Pearl of the Army (1916)
- Mayblossom (1917)
- Her Silent Sacrifice (1917)
- Poppy (1917)
- Resurrection (1918)
- Woman and Wife (1918)
- The Isle of Conquest (1919)
- The Riddle: Woman (1920)
- The Yellow Typhoon (1920)
- The Inner Chamber (1921)
- Her Lord and Master (1921)
- The Matrimonial Web (1921)
- Rainbow (1921)
- The Scarab Ring (1921)
- What Women Will Do (1921)
- The Prodigal Judge (1922)
- The Man from Downing Street (1922)
- The Girl in His Room (1922)
- Terror (1924)
