= Vladimir Petrov (director) =

Soviet film director, screenwriter and actor

- Born: Vladimir Mikhailovich Petrov; 22 July 1896; Saint Petersburg, Russian Empire
- Died: 7 January 1966 (aged 69); Moscow, Soviet Union
- Occupations: Film director, screenwriter, actor
- Years active: 1928–1964

Vladimir Mikhailovich Petrov (Russian: Владимир Михайлович Петров, 22 July 1896 – 7 January 1966) was a Soviet and Russian film director, screenwriter and actor. He directed 24 films between 1928 and 1964. He was awarded Stalin Prize four times, and became a People's Artist of the USSR in 1950.

== Filmography ==
- The Storm (Гроза); 1933
- Peter the Great (Петр Первый); 1937–1938
- Invisible Jan (Неуловимый Ян); 1943
- Kutuzov (Кутузов); 1943
- Guilty Without Guilt (Без вины виноватые); 1945
- The Battle of Stalingrad (Сталинградская битва); 1949
- Sporting Honour (Спортивная честь); 1951
- The Inspector-General (Ревизор); 1952
- Trista let tomu... (300 лет тому...); 1956
- Duel (Поединок); 1957
- First Lesson (Первый урок); 1960

== Awards and honors ==
- Honored Artist of the RSFSR (1935)
- Order of Lenin (1938)
- Stalin Prize first degree (1941) – for film Peter the Great
- Stalin Prize first degree (1946) – for film Kutuzov
- Stalin Prize second degree (1950) – for film Guilty Without Guilt
- Stalin Prize first degree (1950) – for film The Battle of Stalingrad
- Order of the Red Banner of Labour (1944)
- People's Artist of the USSR (1950)
- Medal "For Valiant Labour in the Great Patriotic War 1941–1945"
