= Resurrection (1918 film) =

1918 film

- Directed by: Edward José
- Screenplay by: Charles E. Whittaker
- Based on: Resurrection (Voskraeseniye) by Leo Tolstoy, 1899
- Produced by: Adolph Zukor
- Starring: Pauline Frederick; Robert Elliott; John St. Polis; Jere Austin
- Cinematography: Ned Van Buren
- Production company: Famous Players–Lasky Corporation
- Distributed by: Paramount Pictures
- Release date: May 19, 1918
- Running time: 50 minutes
- Country: United States
- Language: Silent (English intertitles)

Resurrection is a 1918 American silent drama film directed by Edward José. The film stars Pauline Frederick, Robert Elliott, John St. Polis, and Jere Austin. The story was adapted for the screen by Charles E. Whittaker based on Leo Tolstoy's 1899 novel of the same name. The adaptation likely took inspiration from Henri Bataille's 1902 stage adaptation of the novel, which had been translated into English by Michael Morton and presented on the New York stage in 1903. The film was released on May 19, 1918, by Paramount Pictures.

== Plot ==
As described in a film magazine, Katusha, a servant, betrayed by Prince Nekludov, a Russian officer and member of nobility, is forced through the inexorable Russian custom to become a woman of the streets. As a social outcast she is accused of the murder of prominent merchant and sentenced to Siberia by a jury on which the army officer is a member. Overcome by remorse he seeks the Czar and obtains a pardon for Katusha. Upon his arrival in Siberia he gives her the pardon and offers, in atonement for the wrong he has done her, to make her his wife. In the meantime, however, she has been taught right living by Simonson, a peasant, and is determined to stay with him until his sentence is complete.

== Cast ==
- Pauline Frederick as Katusha
- Robert Elliott as Prince Nekludov
- John St. Polis as Simonson
- Jere Austin as Shenbok

== Preservation ==
Resurrection is currently presumed lost. In February of 2021, the film was cited by the National Film Preservation Board on their Lost U.S. Silent Feature Films list.

== See also ==
- A Woman's Resurrection (1915)
