= Mikhail Tsaryov =

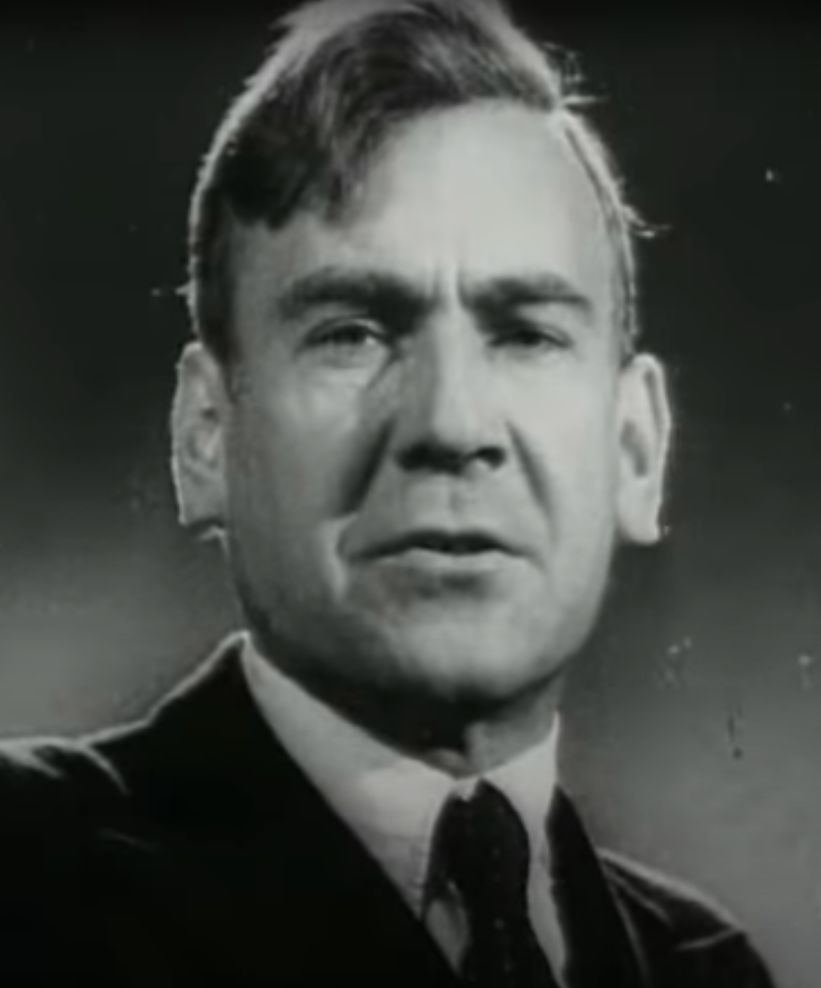
- Born: Mikhail Ivanovich Tsaryov; 1 December 1903; Tver, Russian Empire
- Died: 4 November 1987 (aged 84); Moscow, RSFSR, USSR
- Awards: People's Artist of the USSR (1949)

Mikhail Ivanovich Tsaryov (Russian: Михаи́л Ива́нович Царёв; November 18 [December 1] 1903 — November 4, 1987) was a Soviet theater and film actor, theater director, master of the artistic word (reader). People's Artist of the USSR (1949). Hero of Socialist Labor (1973). The winner of the Stalin Prize second degree (1947) and the State Prize of the USSR (1969). Stanislavsky State Prize of the RSFSR (1977) Member of the CPSU (b) since 1949.

== Filmography ==
- 1932: First Platoon as Lieutenant Kerenko
- 1933: The Storm as Boris Grigoryevich
- 1934: Twice Born as Brovko
- 1936: Gobsek as old organ-grinder
- 1938: Treasure Island as Dr. Livesay
- 1942: Concert to the Front as reader
- 1952: Woe from Wit as Alexander Andreevich Chatsky
- 1952: There Are Enough Common People for Every Wise Man as Glumov
- 1957: Pigmalion as Henry Higgins
- 1958: The Poem of the Sea as Aristarkhov
- 1974: House of Ostrovsky as King Berendey
- 1981: Profitable Place as Aristarkh Vladimirovich Vyshnevsky

== See also ==
- Vsevolod Meyerhold State Theatre
