= Crime and Punishment (1923 film) =

1923 film by Robert Wiene

Raskolnikow
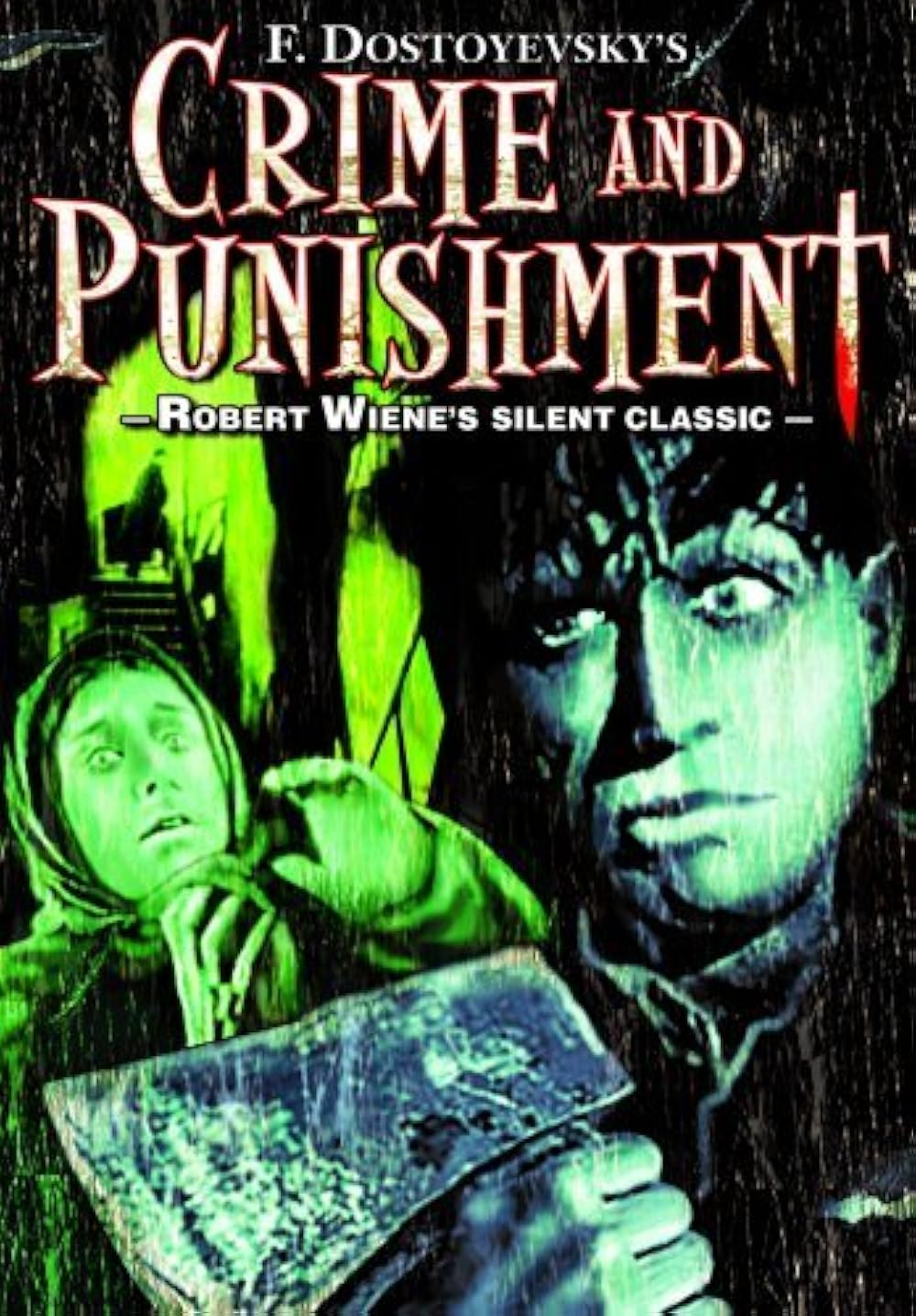
- Poster for the film
- Directed by: Robert Wiene
- Screenplay by: Robert Wiene
- Based on: Crime and Punishment; 1866 novel by Fyodor Dostoyevsky
- Produced by: Robert Wiene
- Starring: Gregori Chmara; Elisaweta Skulskaja; Alla Tarasova
- Cinematography: Willy Goldberger
- Production company: Neumann-Film-Produktion GmbH
- Release date: 3 November 1923
- Running time: 135 minutes
- Country: Germany

Crime and Punishment (German: Raskolnikow) is a 1923 German silent drama film directed by Robert Wiene. The film is an adaptation of the 1866 novel Crime and Punishment by Fyodor Dostoyevsky.

The film is characterised by Jason Buchanan of AllMovie as a German expressionist view of the story: a "nightmarish" avant-garde or experimental psychological drama. It premiered at the Mozartsaal in Berlin.

== Plot ==
Student Raskolnikow, who has written an article about laws and crime, proposing the thesis, that un-ordinary people can commit crimes if their actions are necessary for the benefit of mankind, murders an old woman, who operates a crooked loaning house, as well as her sister, who made the mistake of visiting her at the wrong time. He is suspected of the crime, but somebody else confesses to the murder. Meanwhile, he has fallen in love with Sonja, the street-walking daughter of an ex-official who was fired because of drinking. Raskolnikow's sister is engaged with an arrogant official, who dislikes him, because Raskolnikow gave Sonja 25 Rubel for her father's funeral. When Raskolnikow tells him his opinion of his behaviour against the poor, he tries to show he's a good guy also to the public and showing that Sonja is also a thief at the same time by framing her of a theft of 100 Rubels. But after this, Raskolnikow finds out that Sonja was a very close friend of his second victim.

== Cast ==
- Gregori Chmara as Rodion Raskolnikow
- [Elisabeta Skulskaja as Mother of Rodion Raskolnikow
- Alla Tarasova as Sister of Rodion Raskolnikow
- Andrei Zhilinsky as Rasumichin
- Mikhail Tarkhanov as Marmeladow
- Mariya Germanova as Wife of Marmeladow
- Maria Kryshanovskaya as Sonja, daughter of Marmeladow
- Pavel Pavlov as Untersuchungsrichter (investigating judge)
- Toma as Alona Iwanowa, die Wucherin (the usurer)
- Petr Sharov as Swidrigailow
- Ivan Bersenev as ein Kleinbürger (a member of the petite bourgeoisie)

== Background ==
Crime and Punishment is Robert Wiene's third expressionist film, following The Cabinet of Dr. Caligari and Genuine. The sets were designed by Andrei Andreyev, who created a labyrinthine and distorted decor in the style of the Caligari film. The actors all came from Stanislavski 's Moscow Art Theatre (MKhAT ).

The film had seven acts and, due to its length of 3168 meters, a running time of more than two hours (at a frame rate of 20 frames per second).

== Reception ==
In a retrospective review by Tim Pulleine in the Monthly Film Bulletin that the film was "a conventional prestige opus of the day." Pulleine opined that the dramatisation of the novel was "tolerably effective, barring a few lapses into excessive histrionics (Marmeladov's expiatory confession of alcoholism might have looked extreme in a temperance melodrama)." Pulleine also found that the "most basic problem [...] is that the set designs create a rebarbative dichotomy within the film, since-apart perhaps from the sequences taking place on the stairway leading up to a pawnbroker's flat-the performers are not spatially integrated into the settings but remain obstinately on a separate plane of stylisation."

== Availability ==
A bootleg DVD of the film has been available for years, but contained only around 95 minutes of footage, a full restoration available in both English and Spanish exists on YouTube, but no DVD or other physical release exists for the complete film as of 2025.

The film was restored courtesy of Film Museum, Munich but only had theatrical screenings.

== Bibliography ==
- Jung, Uli; Schatzberg, Walter (1999). Beyond Caligari: The Films of Robert Wiene. Berghahn Books. ISBN 978-1-57181-196-7.
