= Kutuzov (film) =

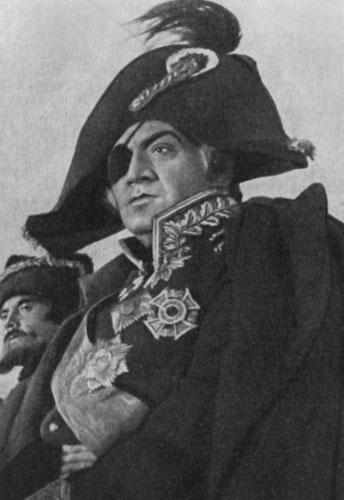
- a character of the film
- Russian: Кутузов
- Directed by: Vladimir Petrov
- Written by: Vladimir Solovyov
- Starring: Aleksei Dikij; Semyon Mezhinsky; Yevgeniy Kaluzhsky; Sergo Zakariadze; Nikolai Okhlopkov; Sergei Blinnikov; Mikhail Pugovkin
- Cinematography: Mikhail Gindin
- Music by: Yuri Shaporin
- Release date: 1943
- Country: Soviet Union
- Language: Russian

Kutuzov (Russian: Кутузов) is a 1943 Soviet drama film directed by Vladimir Petrov.

== Plot ==
The film of 1943 shows the Russian view of the main events of the Patriotic War of 1812.

The main points are Kutuzov's character and warfare, the major battles, the soldiers and the major errors of Napoleon.

- "delaying operation" started by Mikhail Bogdanovich Barclay de Tolly and continued by Kutuzov
- "scorched earth" by burning Moscow
- "guerrilla warfare" on horseback against French supply lines by the Cossacks
- "total war" against French foraging by peasants
- "no peacemaking with Napoleon" by Alexander I of Russia
- Battle of Borodino
- Battle of Maloyaroslavets
- Battle of the Berezina
- French invasion of Russia § Logistics

== Cast ==
- Aleksei Dikiy as Prince Mikhail Kutuzov
- Semyon Mezhinsky as Napoleon Bonaparte
- Yevgeniy Kaluzhsky as Marshal Louis-Alexandre Berthier
- Sergo Zakariadze as General Pyotr Bagration
- Nikolai Okhlopkov as General Michael Andreas Barclay de Tolly
- Sergei Blinnikov as Ataman Matvei Platov
- Mikhail Pugovkin as Fedya, soldier
