= Zoya Barantsevich =

Russian actress

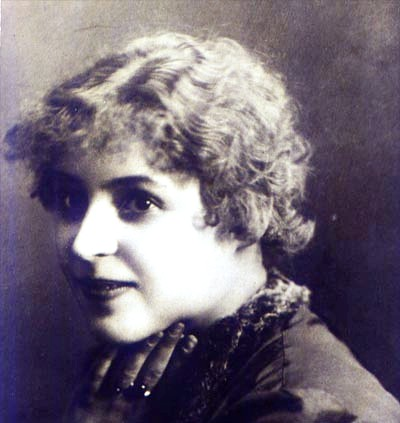
- Born: Zoya Barantsevich; 1896
- Died: 1952 (aged 55–56)
- Occupation: actress
- Years active: 1914–1923

Zoya Barantsevich (Russian: Зоя Баранцевич) was a film actress in the Russian Empire.

== Selected filmography ==
- 1914 — Anna Karenina
- 1916 — Tale of the Blue Sea
- 1916 — Nelli Raintseva
- 1917 — Revolutionary
