= Peter Nansen =

Danish novelist, journalist, and publisher

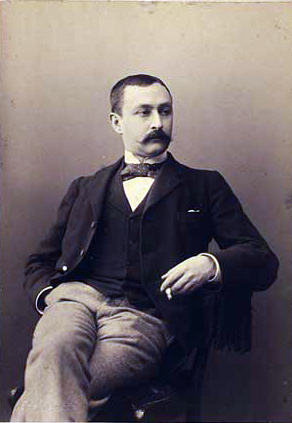
- Peter Nansen, 1898
- Born: January 20, 1861; Copenhagen, Denmark
- Died: July 13, 1918 (aged 57); Mariager, Denmark
- Writing career
- Notable work: Love's Trilogy

Peter Nansen (20 January 1861 – 31 July 1918) was a Danish novelist, journalist, and publisher.

He is best known as the author of the novels Julie's Diary, Marie, and God's Peace, which together constitute Love's Trilogy. Marie in particular became in short order very highly esteemed, and Pierre Bonnard's illustrations (which appeared in 1897 in La Revue Blanche) for the novel were much admired by Renoir. An English translation of Love's Trilogy by Julia Le Gallienne (the second wife of Richard Le Gallienne) appeared in 1908.

Nansen was born in Copenhagen and worked for two decades for the publishing house Gyldendal. It was in his capacity as an editor at Gyldendal that he famously told Sigrid Undset not to attempt to write any more historical novels because she had "no talent for it."

His second wife was the actress Betty Nansen. He died in 1918 in Mariager, a small town in central Denmark.

He is generally regarded as having been very much influenced by the critic Georg Brandes.
