= A Woman's Resurrection =

1915 film

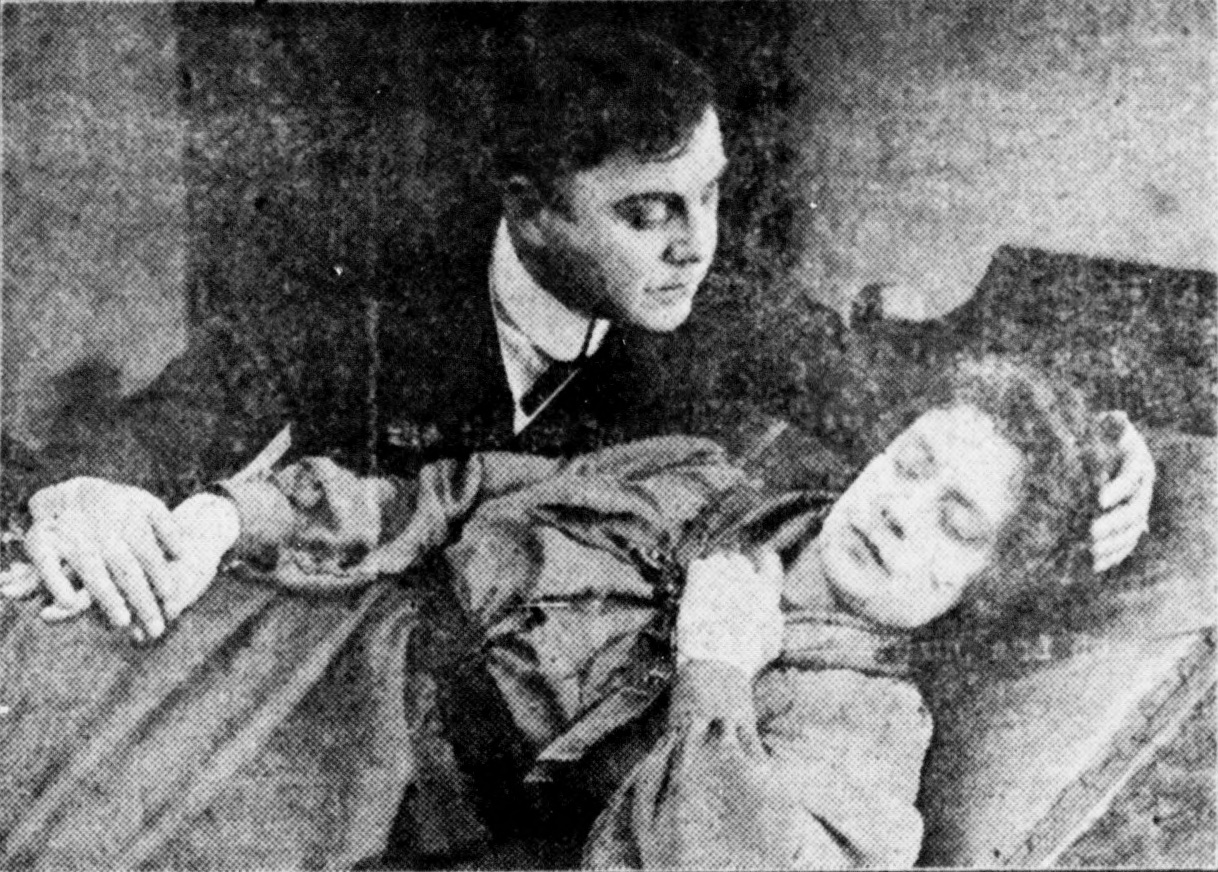
- Scene from the film
- Directed by: J. Gordon Edwards
- Based on: novel, Resurrection by Count Leo Tolstoy c.1899, Moscow
- Produced by: William Fox
- Starring: Betty Nansen
- Distributed by: Fox Films
- Release date: May 1915
- Running time: 5 reels
- Country: USA
- Language: Silent..English titles

A Woman's Resurrection is a lost 1915 silent drama based on Leo Tolstoy's 1899 novel Resurrection. William Fox produced the feature.

== Cast ==
- Betty Nansen - Katusha Maslova
- William J. Kelly - Prince Dimitri Nekhludoff
- Edward José - Simonson
- Mathilde Brundage - Countess Sophia Ivanova (*as Bertha Brundage)
- Arthur Hoops - Ivan Shonbock
- Stuart Holmes - Jacoby
- J. B. Williams - Selenin
- Edgar Davenport - Prince Kerschagen
- Anne Sutherland - Princess Kerschagen
- Frances Lorrimore - Missie (*probably Francine Larrimore)
- Cecilia Sydney - Marietta

== See also ==
- 1937 Fox vault fire
- Resurrection, 1918 film
