= Neya Zorkaya =

Soviet and Russian literary and film critic and historian

Neya Markovna Zorkaya (Russian: Нея Марковна Зоркая; July 12, 1924, Moscow — October 16, 2006, ibid) was a Soviet and Russian culturologist, literary film critic, literary and film scholar, and literary and film historian. She was also a film educator.

== Books ==
Neya Zorkaya published over 1000 scientific and critical articles and 20 books, in addition four books were prepared for publishing from her manuscripts by her daughter posthumously.

== Awards ==
- 1977: USSR Union of Cinematographers Award
- 1996: Honored Worker in Arts of the Russian Federation (ru:Заслуженный деятель искусств Российской Федерации)
- 2006:Nika Award for her contributions to cinematographic sciences, criticism and education
