= Betty Nansen =

Danish actress (1873–1943)

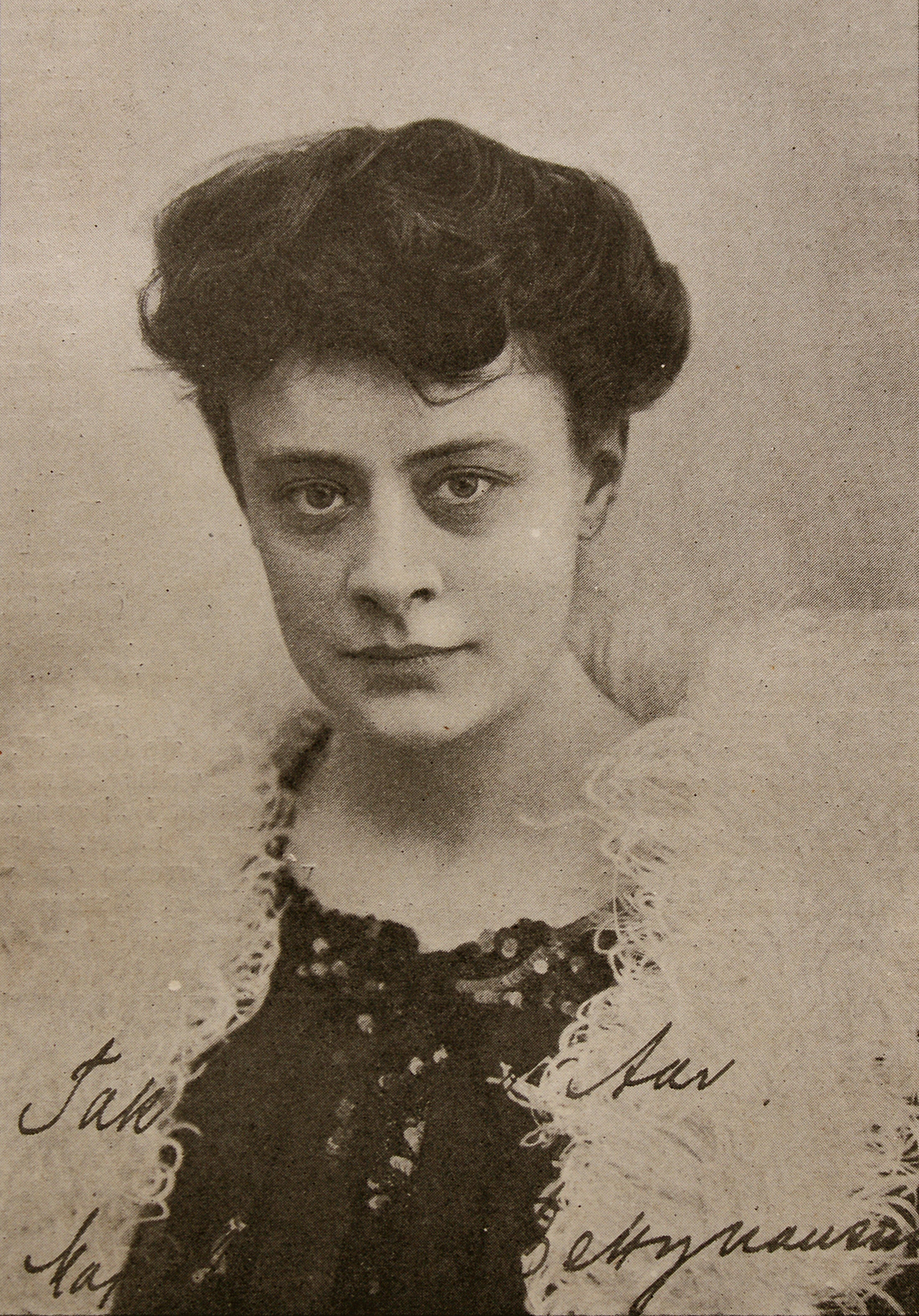
- Nansen in 1919
- Born: Betty Anna Maria Müller; 19 March 1873
- Died: 15 March 1943 (aged 69)
- Occupations: Actress, theatre director
- Spouse(s): Peter Nansen; Henrik Bentzon

Betty Nansen (née Betty Anna Maria Müller; 19 March 1873 – 15 March 1943) was a Danish actress and theatre director of the theater that carries her name, the Betty Nansen Theatre.

== Biography ==
She was born on 19 March 1873.

She had her debut in the fall of 1893 in Copenhagen's Casino Theater as the title character in Victorien Sardou's Dora. She went on to play Magda in Hermann Sudermann's Homeland as well as the title character in Alexandre Dumas' The Lady of the Camellias. In the fall of 1896 she changed to the Royal Danish Theatre, where she had her debut as Martha in Ibsen's The Pillars of Society.

In 1913 to 1916, she went to the United States to try to make a career as a movie actress. She starred in a number of unsuccessful films by J. Gordon Edwards, e.g. Anna Karenina (which is now considered lost) The Song of Hate, Should a Mother Tell, A Woman's Resurrection, and The Celebrated Scandal.

After this failed attempt at movie stardom, she took over management of the Alexandra Theatre in Frederiksberg, which she went on to rename the Betty Nansen Theatre. She managed the theatre for 26 seasons until her death in 1943.

In 1896, she married the writer, journalist and director of Gyldendal, Peter Nansen (1861–1918). Her second marriage was to the actor Henrik Bentzon.

She died on 15 March 1943, just 4 days before her 70th birthday.

== Filmography ==
Year	Title	Role	Notes	Notes
1913	In the Line of Duty			Silent film (short)
1913	Paradise Lost			Silent film
1913	The Princess's Dilemma			Silent film
1914	Moderen			Silent film
1914	Was She Justified?			Silent film
1914	In the Hour of Temptation			Silent film
1914	The Fatal Oath			Silent film
1914	Eventyrersken	Baron esse Magda Gyldenkranzt	August Blom	Silent film (short)
1915	The Celebrated Scandal	Teodora	James Durkin	Silent film
1915	Anna Karenina	Anna Karenina	J. Gordon Edwards	Silent film
1915	A Woman's Resurrection	Katusha Maslova	J. Gordon Edwards	Silent film
1915	The Heart of Lady Alaine			Silent film
1915	Should A Mother Tell?	Marie Baudin	J. Gordon Edwards	Silent film
1915	The Song of Hate	Floria Tosca	J. Gordon Edwards	Silent film
1916	Sonnen	Gerda Krogh	August Blo	Silent film
1917	En ensom Kvinde	Rosa	August Blom	Silent film
