= Anna Karenina (1915 film) =

1915 film directed by J. Gordon Edwards

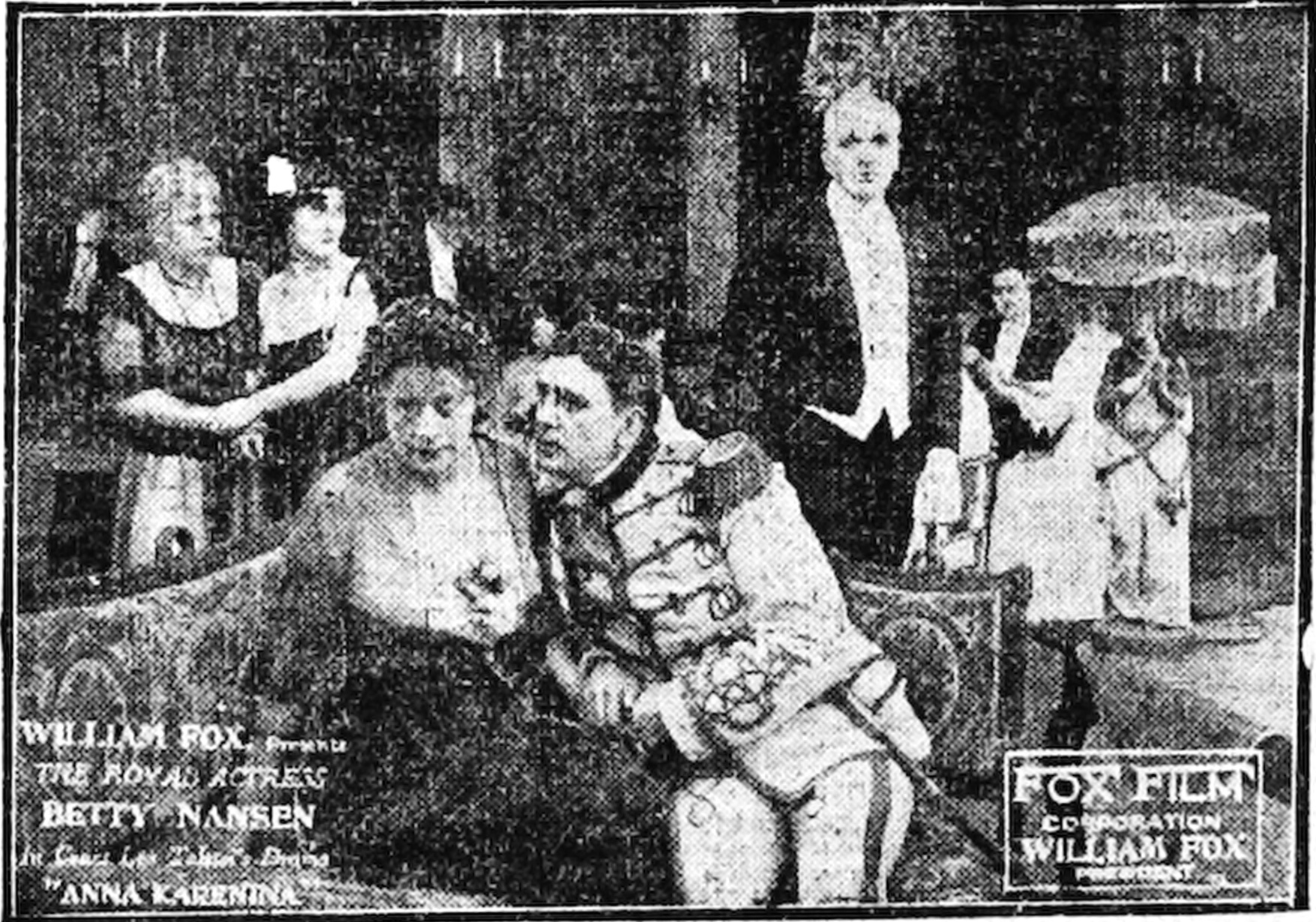
- Newspaper advertisement for film, 1915
- Directed by: J. Gordon Edwards
- Written by: Clara Beranger
- Based on: Anna Karenina; 1878 novel by Leo Tolstoy
- Produced by: William Fox
- Starring: Betty Nansen; Edward José
- Distributed by: Fox Film Corporation
- Release date: April 1, 1915
- Running time: 50 minutes
- Country: United States
- Languages: Silent; English intertitles

Anna Karenina is a 1915 American silent drama film directed by J. Gordon Edwards and starring Betty Nansen. It was the first American adaptation of the 1878 novel by Leo Tolstoy. Some scenes were shot on location at a ski resort near Montreal.

== Plot ==
Anna Karenina is a married aristocrat and socialite living in Saint Petersburg. She is living a torrid romance with a wealthy and young count, he loves her and is willing to marry her once she leave her husband.

However, her infidelity causes her social peers to ostracize her. In isolation she becomes possessive and even paranoid. Untrustworthy herself, she cannot trust her lover and her mental and emotional instability lead eventually to her suicide.

== Cast ==
- Betty Nansen as Anna Karenina
- Edward José as Baron Alexis Karenin
- Richard Thornton as Prince Vronsky
- Stella Hammerstein

== Preservation ==
With no prints of Anna Karenina located in any film archives, it is considered a lost film.

== See also ==
- List of lost films
- 1937 Fox vault fire

== Bibliography ==
- Krefft, Vanda. The Man Who Made the Movies: The Meteoric Rise and Tragic Fall of William Fox. HarperCollins, 2017.
