= Anna Karenina (1961 film) =

1961 British TV film

Anna Karenina is a 1961 British TV adaptation of Leo Tolstoy's 1877 novel Anna Karenina.

It aired on American television in 1964.

The production was thought lost but a copy was found in 2010.

== Cast ==
- Claire Bloom as Anna Karenina
- Sean Connery as Count Alexis Vronsky
- Jack Watling as Stiva, Prince Oblonsky
- Valerie Taylor as Countess Vronsky
- Daphne Anderson as Dolly
- June Thorburn as Kitty
- Albert Lieven as Alexis Karenin
- Frank Williams as Korsunsky
