= Anna Karenina =

1878 novel by Leo Tolstoy

- Cover page of the first volume of Anna Karenina, Moscow, 1878
- Author: Leo Tolstoy
- Original title: Анна Каренина
- Language: Russian
- Genre: Realist novel Tragedy
- Publisher: The Russian Messenger
- Publication date: 1878
- Publication place: Russia
- Media type: Print (serial)
- Pages: 964
- Original text: Анна Каренина at Russian Wikisource
- Translation: Anna Karenina at Wikisource

Anna Karenina (Russian: Анна Каренина, IPA: [ˈanːə kɐˈrʲenʲɪnə]) is a novel, first published in book form in 1878, by the Russian author Leo Tolstoy. Often considered to be the greatest work of world literature, Tolstoy himself called it his first true novel. It was initially released in serial installments from 1875 to 1877, all but the last part appearing in the periodical The Russian Messenger. By the time he was finishing up the last installments, Tolstoy was in an anguished state of mind having come to hate it but finished it unwillingly.

The novel deals with themes of betrayal, faith, family, marriage, Imperial Russian society, desire, and the differences between rural and urban life. The story centres on an extramarital affair between Anna and cavalry officer Count Alexei Kirillovich Vronsky that scandalises the social circles of Saint Petersburg and forces the young lovers to flee to Italy in pursuit of happiness, but after they return to Russia, their lives further unravel.

Trains are a motif throughout the novel, with several major plot points taking place either on passenger trains or at stations in Saint Petersburg and elsewhere in Russia. The story takes place against the backdrop of the liberal reforms initiated by Emperor Alexander II of Russia and the rapid societal transformations that followed. The novel has been adapted into various media including theatre, opera, film, television, ballet, figure skating, and radio drama.

== Main characters ==
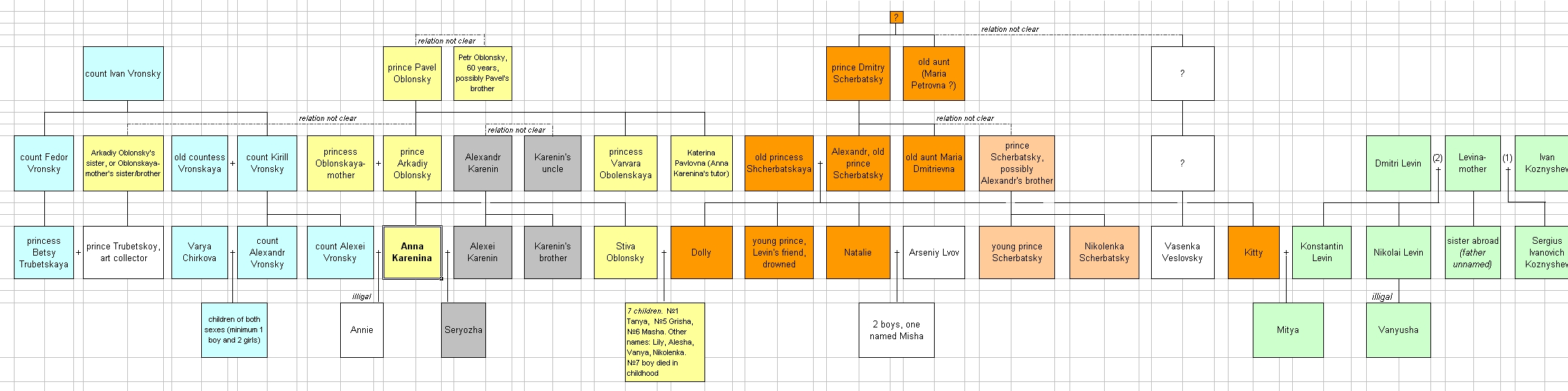
Anna Karenina family tree

- Anna Arkadyevna Karenina (Анна Аркадьевна Каренина): Stepan Oblonsky's sister, Karenin's wife and Vronsky's lover.
- Count Alexei Kirillovich Vronsky (Алексей Кириллович Вронский): Anna's lover, cavalry officer.
- Prince Stepan "Stiva" Arkadyevich Oblonsky (Степан "Стива" Аркадьевич Облонский): civil servant and Anna's brother, man about town, 34 years of age.
- Princess Darya "Dolly" Alexandrovna Oblonskaya (Дарья "Долли" Александровна Облонская): Stepan's wife, 33 years of age.
- Alexei Alexandrovich Karenin (Алексей Александрович Каренин): senior statesman and Anna's husband, twenty years her senior.
- Konstantin "Kostya" Dmitrievich Levin/Lyovin (Константин "Костя" Дмитриевич Лёвин): Kitty's suitor, Stiva's old friend, landowner, 32 years of age. He is often considered to be Tolstoy's alter ego.
- Nikolai Dmitrievich Levin/Lyovin (Николай Дмитриевич Лёвин): Konstantin's elder brother, impoverished alcoholic.
- Sergei Ivanovich Koznyshev (Сергей Иванович Кознышев): Konstantin's half-brother, celebrated writer, 40 years of age.
- Princess Ekaterina "Kitty" Alexandrovna Shcherbatskaya (Екатерина "Кити" Александровна Щербацкая): Dolly's younger sister and later Levin's wife, 18 years of age.
- Prince Alexander Shcherbatsky (Александр Щербацкий): Dolly and Kitty's father.
- Princess Shcherbatskaya (no name or patronymic given): Dolly and Kitty's mother.
- Princess Elizaveta "Betsy" Tverskaya (Елизавета "Бетси" Тверская): Anna's wealthy, morally loose society friend and Vronsky's cousin.
- Countess Lidia (or Lydia) Ivanovna (Лидия Ивановна): leader of a high society circle that includes Karenin, and shuns Princess Betsy and her circle. She maintains an interest in Russian Orthodoxy, mysticism and spirituality.
- Countess Vronskaya: Vronsky's mother.
- Sergei "Seryozha" Alexeyich Karenin (Сергей "Серёжа" Каренин): Anna and Karenin's son, eight years of age.
- Anna "Annie" (Анна "Ани"): Anna and Vronsky's daughter.
- Agafya Mikhailovna (Агафья Михайловнa): Levin's former nurse, now his trusted housekeeper.

== Plot introduction ==
Anna Karenina consists of more than the story of Anna Karenina, a married socialite, and her affair with the affluent Count Vronsky, though their relationship is a very strong component of the plot. The story starts when she arrives in the midst of her brother's family being broken up by his unbridled womanising—something that prefigures her own later situation.

A bachelor, Vronsky is eager to marry Anna if she will agree to leave her husband Karenin, a senior government official. Although Vronsky and Anna go to Italy, where they can be together, leaving behind Anna's child from her first marriage, they have trouble making friends. When they return to Russia, Anna suffers shunning and isolation due to the relationship. While Vronsky pursues his social life, Anna grows increasingly possessive and paranoid about his supposed infidelity.

A parallel story within the novel is Konstantin Levin, a wealthy country landowner who wants to marry Kitty, sister to Dolly and sister-in-law to Anna's brother Stepan Oblonsky. Levin has to propose twice before Kitty accepts. The novel details Levin's difficulties managing his estate, his eventual marriage, and his struggle to accept the Christian faith, until the birth of his first child.

The novel explores a diverse range of topics throughout its approximately one thousand pages. Some of these topics include an evaluation of the land and agricultural system that existed in Russia at the time as well as politics, not only in the Russian government, but also at the level of the individual characters and families, religion, morality, gender, and social class.

== Summary ==
The novel is divided into eight parts and 239 chapters. Its epigraph is "Vengeance is mine; I will repay", from Romans 12:19, which in turn quotes from Deuteronomy 32:35. The novel begins with one of its most oft-quoted lines:

Все счастливые семьи похожи друг на друга, каждая несчастливая семья несчастлива по-своему.
Vse schastlivyye sem'i pokhozhi drug na druga, kazhdaya neschastlivaya sem'ya neschastliva po-svoyemu.
Happy families are all alike; every unhappy family is unhappy in its own way.

=== Part 1 ===
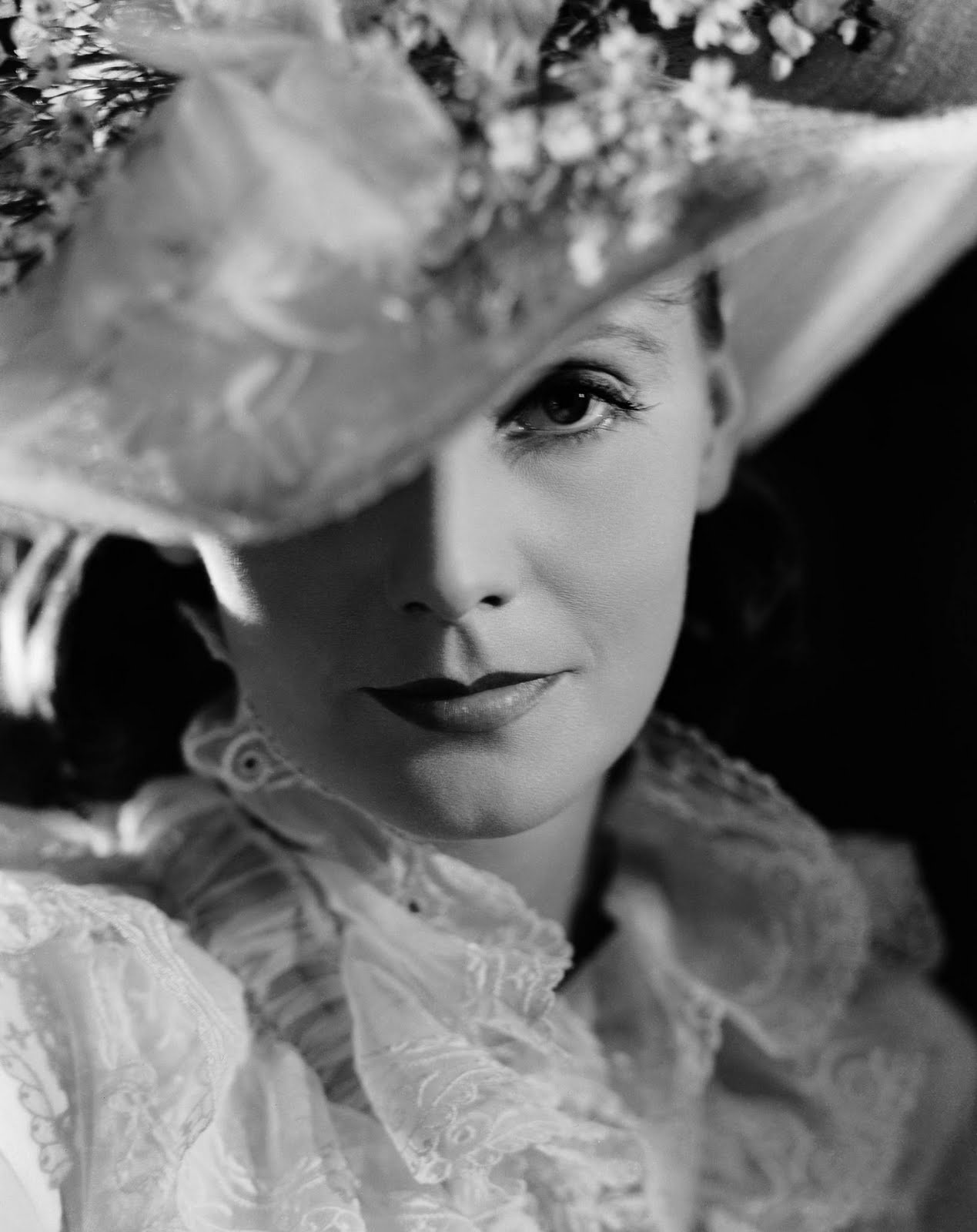
Greta Garbo in a publicity still for Anna Karenina, MGM's influential 1935 production of Tolstoy's novel.

Prince Stepan Arkadyevich Oblonsky ("Stiva"), a Moscow aristocrat and civil servant, has been unfaithful to his wife, Princess Darya Alexandrovna ("Dolly"). Dolly has discovered his affair with the family's governess, and the household and family are in turmoil. Stiva informs the household that his married sister, Anna Arkadyevna Karenina, is coming to visit from Saint Petersburg in a bid to calm the situation.

Meanwhile, Stiva's childhood friend, Konstantin Dmitrievich Levin ("Kostya"), arrives in Moscow with the aim of proposing to Dolly's youngest sister, Princess Katerina Alexandrovna Shcherbatskaya ("Kitty"). Kostya is a passionate, restless, but shy aristocratic landowner who, unlike his Moscow friends, chooses to live in the country on his large estate. He discovers that Kitty is also being pursued by Count Alexei Kirillovich Vronsky, an army cavalry officer.

Whilst at the railway station to meet his sister Anna, Stiva bumps into Vronsky who is there to meet his mother, the Countess Vronskaya. Anna and Vronskaya have travelled and talked together in the same carriage. As the family members are reunited and Vronsky sees Anna for the first time, a railway worker accidentally falls in front of a moving train carriage and is killed. Anna interprets this as an "evil omen".

At the Oblonsky home, Anna talks openly and emotionally to Dolly about Stiva's affair and convinces her that Stiva still loves her despite the infidelity. Dolly is moved by Anna's speeches and decides to forgive Stiva.

Kitty, who comes to visit Dolly and Anna, is just eighteen. In her first season as a debutante, she is expected to make an excellent match with a man of her own social standing. Vronsky has been paying her considerable attention, and she expects to dance with him at a ball that evening. Kitty is very struck by Anna's beauty and personality and becomes infatuated with her just as much as with Vronsky. When Kostya proposes to Kitty at her home, she clumsily turns him down, as she is in love with Vronsky and believes that he will propose to her; she was encouraged to do so by her mother, the Princess Shcherbatskaya, who believes Vronsky would be a better match (in contrast to Kitty's father, who favours Kostya).

At the ball Kitty expects to hear something definitive from Vronsky, but he dances with Anna instead, choosing her as a partner over a shocked and heartbroken Kitty. Kitty realises that Vronsky has fallen in love with Anna and has no intention of marrying her, despite his overt flirtations. Vronsky has regarded his interactions with Kitty merely as a source of amusement and assumes that Kitty has acted for the same reasons. Anna, shaken by her emotional and physical response to Vronsky, returns at once to St. Petersburg. Vronsky travels on the same train. During the overnight journey, the two meet and Vronsky confesses his love. Anna refuses him, although she is affected by his attentions.

Kostya, crushed by Kitty's refusal, returns to his estate, abandoning any hope of marriage. Anna returns to her husband, Count Alexei Alexandrovich Karenin, a senior government official, and their 8-year-old son, Seryozha, in St. Petersburg.

=== Part 2 ===
The Shcherbatskys consult doctors over Kitty's health, which has been failing since Vronsky's rejection. A specialist advises that Kitty should go abroad to a health spa to recover. Dolly speaks to Kitty and understands she is suffering because of Vronsky and Kostya, whom she cares for and had hurt in vain. Kitty, humiliated by Vronsky and tormented by her rejection of Kostya, upsets her sister by referring to Stiva's infidelity, saying she could never love a man who betrayed her. Meanwhile, Stiva visits Kostya on his country estate while selling a nearby plot of land.

In St. Petersburg, Anna begins to spend more time in the inner circle of Princess Elizaveta ("Betsy"), a fashionable socialite and Vronsky's cousin. Vronsky continues to pursue Anna. Although she initially tries to reject him, she eventually succumbs to his attentions and begins an affair. Meanwhile, Karenin reminds his wife of the impropriety of paying too much attention to Vronsky in public, which is becoming the subject of gossip. He is concerned about the couple's public image, although he mistakenly believes that Anna is above suspicion.

Vronsky, a keen horseman, takes part in a steeplechase event, during which he rides his mare Frou-Frou too hard—his irresponsibility causing him to fall and break the horse's back. Anna is unable to hide her distress during the accident. Before this, Anna had told Vronsky that she is pregnant with his child. Karenin is also present at the races and remarks to Anna that her behavior is improper. Anna, in a state of extreme distress and emotion, confesses her affair to her husband. Karenin asks her to break it off to avoid further gossip, believing that their marriage will be preserved.

Kitty and her mother travel to a German spa to enable Kitty to recover from her ill health. There, they meet the wheelchair-using Pietist Madame Stahl, who is accompanied by the kind and virtuous Varenka, her adopted daughter. Influenced by Varenka, Kitty becomes extremely pious and concerned for others, but when her father joins them she becomes disillusioned after learning from him that Madame Stahl is faking her illness. She then returns to Moscow.

=== Part 3 ===
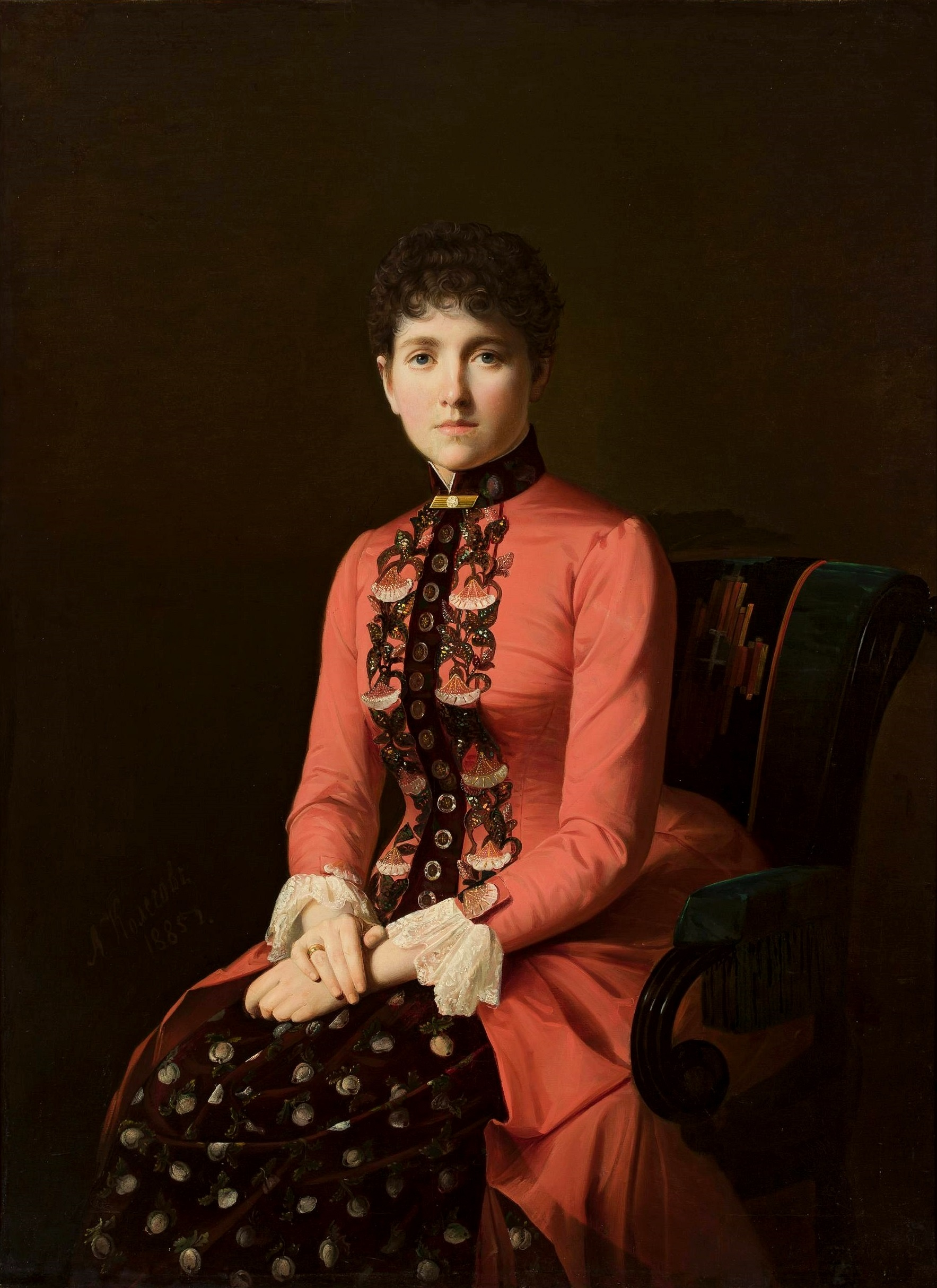
Portrait of a Young Woman (or so called "Anna Karenina") by Aleksei Mikhailovich Kolesov, 1885, National Museum in Warsaw

Kostya continues working on his estate, a setting closely tied to his spiritual thoughts and struggles. He wrestles with the idea of falseness, wondering how he should go about ridding himself of it, and criticizing what he feels is falseness in others. He develops ideas relating to agriculture, and the unique relationship between the agricultural laborer and his native land and culture. He comes to believe that the agricultural reforms of Europe will not work in Russia because of the unique culture and personality of the Russian peasant.

When Kostya visits Dolly, she attempts to understand what happened between him and Kitty and to explain Kitty's behavior. Kostya is very agitated by Dolly's talk about Kitty, and he begins to feel distant from Dolly as he perceives her loving behavior towards her children as false. Kostya resolves to forget Kitty and contemplates the possibility of marriage to a peasant woman. However, a chance sighting of Kitty in her carriage makes Kostya realise he still loves her. Meanwhile, in St. Petersburg, Karenin refuses to separate from Anna, insisting that their relationship will continue. He threatens to take away their son Seryozha if she persists in her affair with Vronsky.

=== Part 4 ===
When Anna and Vronsky continue seeing each other, Karenin consults a lawyer about obtaining a divorce. During the time period, a divorce in Russia could only be requested by the innocent party in an affair and required either that the guilty party confess or that the guilty party be discovered in the act of adultery. Karenin forces Anna to hand over some of Vronsky's love letters, which the lawyer deems insufficient as proof of the affair. Stiva and Dolly argue against Karenin's drive for a divorce.

Karenin changes his plans after hearing that Anna is at risk of death after the difficult birth of her daughter, Annie. At her bedside, Karenin forgives Vronsky. However, Vronsky, embarrassed by Karenin's kindness, unsuccessfully attempts suicide by shooting himself. As Anna recovers, she finds that she cannot bear living with Karenin despite his forgiveness and his attachment to Annie. When she hears that Vronsky is about to leave for a military posting in Tashkent, she becomes desperate. Anna and Vronsky reunite and flee to Italy, leaving behind Seryozha and Karenin's offer of divorce.

Meanwhile, Stiva acts as a matchmaker with Kostya: he arranges a meeting between him and Kitty, which results in their reconciliation and engagement.

=== Part 5 ===
Kostya and Kitty marry and start their new life on his country estate. Although the couple are happy, they undergo a bitter and stressful first three months of marriage. Kostya feels dissatisfied at the amount of time Kitty wants to spend with him and dwells on his inability to be as productive as he was as a bachelor. When the marriage starts to improve, Kostya learns that his brother, Nikolai, is dying of consumption. Kitty offers to accompany Kostya on his journey to see Nikolai and proves herself a great help in nursing Nikolai. Seeing his wife take charge of the situation in an infinitely more capable manner than he could have done himself without her, Kostya's love for Kitty grows. Kitty eventually learns that she is pregnant.

In Italy, Vronsky and Anna struggle to find friends who will accept them. Whilst Anna is happy to be finally alone with Vronsky, he feels suffocated. They cannot socialize with Russians of their own class and find it difficult to amuse themselves. Vronsky, who had believed that being with Anna was the key to his happiness, finds himself increasingly bored and unsatisfied. He takes up painting and makes an attempt to patronize an émigré Russian artist of genius. However, Vronsky cannot see that his own art lacks talent and passion, and that his conversation about art is extremely pretentious. Increasingly restless, Anna and Vronsky decide to return to Russia.

In St. Petersburg, Anna and Vronsky stay in one of the best hotels, but take separate suites. It becomes clear that whilst Vronsky is still able to move freely in Russian society, Anna is barred from it. Even her old friend, Princess Betsy, who has had affairs herself, evades her company. Anna starts to become anxious that Vronsky no longer loves her. Meanwhile, Karenin is comforted by Countess Lidia Ivanovna, an enthusiast of religious and mystic ideas fashionable with the upper classes. She advises him to keep Seryozha away from Anna and to tell him his mother is dead. However, Seryozha refuses to believe that this is true. Anna visits Seryozha uninvited on his ninth birthday but is discovered by Karenin.

Anna, desperate to regain at least some of her former position in society, attends a show at the theater at which all of St. Petersburg's high society are present. Vronsky begs her not to go, but he is unable to bring himself to explain to her why she cannot attend. At the theater, Anna is openly snubbed by her former friends, one of whom makes a deliberate scene and leaves the theater. Anna is devastated. Unable to find a place for themselves in St. Petersburg, Anna and Vronsky leave for Vronsky's country estate.

=== Part 6 ===
Dolly, her children, and her mother, the Princess Shcherbatskaya, spend the summer with Kostya and Kitty. The couple's life is simple and unaffected, although Kostya is uneasy at the "invasion" of so many Shcherbatskys. He becomes extremely jealous when one of the visitors, Veslovsky, flirts openly with the pregnant Kitty. Kostya tries to overcome his jealousy, and briefly succeeds during a hunt with Veslovsky and Oblonsky, but eventually succumbs to his feelings and asks Veslovsky to leave. Veslovsky immediately goes to stay with Anna and Vronsky at their nearby estate.

When Dolly visits Anna, she is struck by the difference between Kostya and Kitty's aristocratic-yet-simple home life and Vronsky's overtly luxurious and lavish country estate. She is also unable to keep pace with Anna's fashionable dresses or Vronsky's extravagant spending on a hospital he is building. In addition, all is not quite well with Anna and Vronsky. Dolly notices Anna's anxious behavior and her uncomfortable flirtations with Veslovsky. Vronsky makes an emotional request to Dolly, asking her to convince Anna to seek a divorce from Karenin so that the two might marry and live normally.

Anna has become intensely jealous of Vronsky and cannot bear when he leaves her, even for short excursions. When Vronsky leaves for several days of provincial elections, Anna becomes convinced that she must marry him to prevent him from leaving her. After Anna writes to Karenin again seeking a divorce, she and Vronsky leave the countryside for Moscow.

=== Part 7 ===
While visiting Moscow for Kitty to give birth, Kostya quickly gets used to the city's fast-paced, expensive and frivolous society life. He accompanies Stiva to a gentleman's club, where the two meet Vronsky. Kostya and Stiva pay a visit to Anna, who is occupying her empty days by being a patroness to an orphaned English girl. Kostya is initially uneasy about the visit, but Anna easily puts him under her spell. When he admits to Kitty that he has visited Anna, she accuses him of falling in love with her. The couple are later reconciled, realizing that Moscow society life has had a negative, corrupting effect on Kostya.

Anna cannot understand why she can attract a man like Kostya, who has a young and beautiful new wife, but can no longer attract Vronsky. Her relationship with Vronsky is under increasing strain, because he can move freely in Russian society while she remains excluded. Her increasing bitterness, boredom, and jealousy cause the couple to argue.

Anna begins to abuse morphine to help her sleep, a habit she began while living with Vronsky at his country estate, and becomes addicted to the narcotic. Meanwhile, after a long and difficult labour, Kitty gives birth to a son, Dmitri, who goes by the nickname Mitya. Kostya is paradoxically both horrified and profoundly moved by the sight of the tiny baby.

Stiva visits Karenin to seek his commendation for a new post. During the visit, Stiva asks Karenin to grant Anna a divorce with her as the innocent party (which would require him to confess to a non-existent affair), but Karenin's decisions are now governed by a French clairvoyant recommended by Lidia Ivanovna. The clairvoyant apparently had a vision in his sleep during Stiva's visit and gives Karenin a cryptic message that he interprets in a way such that he must decline the request for divorce.

Anna becomes increasingly jealous and irrational towards Vronsky, whom she suspects of having love affairs with other women. She is also convinced that he will give in to his mother's plans to marry him off to a rich society woman. They have a bitter row and Anna believes the relationship is over. She starts to think of suicide as an escape from her torments. In her mental and emotional confusion, she sends a telegram to Vronsky asking him to come home to her, and then pays a visit to Dolly and Kitty. Anna's confusion and anger overcome her and, in conscious symmetry with the railway worker's death on her first meeting with Vronsky, from ground level at the end of a railway platform, she commits suicide by throwing herself under a passing freight train.

=== Part 8 ===
Sergei Ivanovich's (Kostya's brother) latest book is ignored by readers and critics and he participates in the Russian commitment to Pan-Slavism. Anna's brother Stiva gets the post he desired so much, and Karenin takes custody of Vronsky and Anna's baby, Annie. A group of Russian volunteers, including the suicidal Vronsky, depart from Russia to fight in the Orthodox Serbian revolt that has broken out against the Turks, more broadly identified as the Russo-Turkish War (1877–1878).

Kostya struggles to find the meaning of his life after his brother Nikolai's death from consumption, and begins to have suicidal thoughts. However, after speaking at length to a peasant, Kostya has a true change of heart, concluding that the meaning of life is to serve God, and that he does believe in the Christian principles taught to him in childhood and no longer questions his faith. He realizes that one must decide for oneself what is acceptable concerning one's own faith and beliefs and chooses not to tell Kitty of the change that he has undergone.

A lightning storm later occurs at Kostya's estate while his wife and newborn son are outdoors and, in his fear for their safety, Kostya realizes that he does indeed love his son as much as he loves Kitty. Kitty's family is concerned that a man as altruistic as her husband does not consider himself to be a Christian.

Kostya is initially displeased that his return to his faith does not bring with it a complete transformation to righteousness. However, at the end of the story, Kostya arrives at the conclusion that despite his newly accepted beliefs, he is human and will go on making mistakes. His life can now be meaningfully and truthfully oriented toward righteousness.

== Style and major themes ==
Tolstoy's style in Anna Karenina is considered by many critics to be transitional, forming a bridge between the realist and modernist novel. According to Ruth Benson in her book about Tolstoy's heroines, Tolstoy's diaries show how displeased he was with his style and approach to writing in early drafts of Anna Karenina, quoting him as stating, "I loathe what I have written. The galleys of Anna Karenina for the April issue of Russkij Vestnik now lie on my table, and I really don't have the heart to correct them. Everything in them is so rotten, and the whole thing should be rewritten—all that has been printed too—scrapped, and melted down, thrown away, renounced (1876, JI 62: 265)".

Anna Karenina is commonly thought to explore the themes of hypocrisy, jealousy, faith, fidelity, family, marriage, society, progress, carnal desire and passion, and the agrarian connection to land in contrast to the lifestyles of the city. According to literary theorist Kornelije Kvas, in the novel Anna Karenina, "unofficial institutions of the system, presented through social salons, function as part of the power apparatus that successfully calms the disorder created by Anna's irrational emotional action, which is a symbol of resistance to the system of social behavioral control." Translator Rosemary Edmonds wrote that Tolstoy does not explicitly moralize in the book, but instead allows his themes to emerge naturally from the "vast panorama of Russian life." She also says one of the novel's key messages is that "no one may build their happiness on another's pain."

Konstantin "Kostya" Dmitrievich Levin is often considered a semi-autobiographical portrayal of Tolstoy's own beliefs, struggles, and life events. Tolstoy's first name was "Lev", and the Russian surname "Levin" means "of Lev". According to footnotes in the Pevear/Volokhonsky translation, the viewpoints Levin supports throughout the novel in his arguments match Tolstoy's outspoken views on the same issues. Moreover, according to W. Gareth Jones, Levin proposed to Kitty in the same way as Tolstoy to Sophia Behrs. The introduction to the Maude translation adds that the scene in which Levin and Kitty declare their love through the initial letters of words is faithful in its minutest details to Tolstoy's own wooing. Additionally, Levin's request that his fiancée read his diary as a way of disclosing his faults and previous sexual encounters parallels Tolstoy's own request to his fiancée Behrs to read his diary.

== Historical context ==
The events in the novel take place against the backdrop of rapid transformations as a result of the liberal reforms initiated by Emperor Alexander II of Russia, principal among these the emancipation reform of 1861, followed by judicial reform, including a jury system; military reforms, the introduction of elected local governments (zemstvos), the fast development of railroads, banks, industry, telegraphy, the rise of new business elites and the decline of the old landed aristocracy, a freer press, the awakening of public opinion, the Pan-Slavism movement, the woman question, volunteering to aid Serbia in its military conflict with the Ottoman Empire in 1876, etc. These contemporary developments are hotly debated by the characters in the novel.

The suburban railway station of Obiralovka, where one of the characters commits suicide, is now known as the town of Zheleznodorozhny, Moscow Oblast.

== Reception ==
In 1877, Dostoevsky published the essay "Anna Karenina as a Fact of Special Importance," later included in A Writer's Diary. He wrote that "Anna Karenina, as an artistic production, is perfect. It has appeared at an opportune moment, and in our epoch no work in European belles-lettres can compare with it."

An 1885 reviewer in The Nation wrote that "Tolstoi shows us life as it really is, with its complexities, its necessary tedium, its frivolities. He does not deceive us: his finest characters have their weak points; he knows that perfection is not human."

William Dean Howells wrote, "After 'The Cossacks' I read 'Anna Karenina' with a deepening sense of the author's unrivaled greatness. I thought that I saw through his eyes a human affair of that most sorrowful sort as it must appear to the Infinite Compassion; the book is a sort of revelation of human nature in circumstances that have been so perpetually lied about that we have almost lost the faculty of perceiving the truth concerning an illicit love."

Matthew Arnold praised

the result which, by his extraordinary fineness of perception, and by his sincere fidelity to it, the author achieves; he works in us a sense of the absolute reality of his personages and their doings. Anna’s shoulders, and masses of hair, and half-shut eyes; Alexis Karenin’s updrawn eyebrows, and tired smile, and cracking finger-joints; Stiva’s eyes suffused with facile moisture—these are as real to us as any of those outward peculiarities which in our own circle of acquaintance we are noticing daily, while the inner man of our circle of acquaintance, happily or unhappily, lies a great deal less clearly revealed to us than that of Count Tolstoy’s creations.

Anna Karenina's immediate reception in the United States was mixed, with the work's themes and eponymous character receiving praise but its length and depiction of suicide receiving criticism.

When William Faulkner was asked to list what he thought were the three greatest novels, he replied: "Anna Karenina, Anna Karenina, and Anna Karenina".

Thomas Mann referred to Anna Karenina as "that very greatest novel of society."

Vladimir Nabokov described the book as "one of the greatest love stories in world literature."

== Translations into English ==
The first scholarly edition of Anna Karenina in Russian was published in 1970. It corrected "some 900 errors" that had accumulated over the years in successive Russian editions. This is the edition usually (but not always) followed by subsequent English translations, new and revised.

=== Public Domain ===
1. Anna Karénina, translated by Nathan Haskell Dole (New York: Thomas Y. Crowell & Co., 1886)
2. Anna Karenina, translated by Constance Garnett (London: William Heinemann, 1901). Still widely reprinted by various publishers.
3. Anna Karénin, translated by Leo Wiener (Boston: The Colonial Press, 1904)
4. Anna Karenina, translated by Rochelle S. Townsend (London: J. M. Dent & Sons, 1912; New York: E. P. Dutton & Co., 1912)
5. Anna Karenina, translated by Aylmer and Louise Maude (Oxford: Oxford University Press, 1918)

=== Copyrighted ===
1. Anna Karenin, translated by Rosemary Edmonds (Penguin, 1954, revised 1978)
2. Anna Karenina, translated by Constance Garnett, revised by Leonard J. Kent and Nina Berberova (New York: Random House, 1965); reissued many times under the publisher's Modern Library imprint.
3. Anna Karenina, translated by Aylmer and Louise Maude, revised by George Gibian (Norton Critical Edition, 1970)
4. Anna Karenina, translated by Joel Carmichael (Bantam Books, 1960)
5. Anna Karenina, translated by David Magarshack (New American Library, 1961)
6. Anna Karenina, translated by Morris S. Gurin and Jacob Gurin (Washington Square Press, 1966)
7. Anna Karénina, translated by Margaret Wettlin (Progress Publishers, 1978)
8. Anna Karenina, translated by Richard Pevear and Larissa Volokhonsky (Penguin, 2000)
9. Anna Karenina, translated by Kyril Zinovieff and Jenny Hughes (Oneworld Classics, 2008), reissued in 2014 under the publisher's new name, Alma Books.
10. Anna Karenina, translated by Rosamund Bartlett (Oxford University Press, 2014)
11. Anna Karenina, translated by Marian Schwartz (Yale University Press, 2015)
12. Anna Karenina, translated by Nicolas Pasternak Slater and Maya Slater (Folio Society, 2026)

=== Comparisons of translations ===
Writing in 2000, academic Zoja Pavlovskis-Petit compared the different translations of Anna Karenina on the market. Commenting on the revision of Constance Garnett's 1901 translation she says: "The revision (1965) ... by Kent & Berberova (the latter no mean stylist herself) succeeds in 'correcting errors ... tightening the prose, converting Briticisms, and casting light on areas Mrs Garnett did not explore'. Their edition shows an excellent understanding of the details of Tolstoy's world (for instance, the fact that the elaborate coiffure Kitty wears to the ball is not her own hair—a detail that eludes most other translators), and at the same time they use English imaginatively (Kitty's shoes 'delighted her feet' rather than 'seemed to make her feet lighter'—Maude; a paraphrase). ... the purist will be pleased to see Kent & Berberova give all the Russian names in full, as used by the author; any reader will be grateful for the footnotes that elucidate anything not immediately accessible to someone not well acquainted with imperial Russia. This emended Garnett should probably be a reader's first choice."

She further comments on the Maudes' translation: "the revised Garnett and the Magarshack versions do better justice to the original, but still, the World's Classics edition (1995) ... offers a very full List of Characters ... and good notes based on the Maudes'." On Edmonds's translation she states: "[it] has the advantage of solid scholarship ... Yet she lacks a true sensitivity for the language ... [leading] to [her] missing many a subtlety." On Carmichael's version she comments: "this is a—rather breezily—readable translation ... but there are errors and misunderstandings, as well as clumsiness." On Magarshack's translation she comments: "[it] offers natural, simple, and direct English prose that is appropriate to Tolstoy's Russian. There is occasional awkwardness ... and imprecision ... but Magarshack understands the text ... and even when unable to translate an idiom closely he renders its real meaning ... This is a good translation." On Wettlin's Soviet version she writes: "steady but uninspired, and sounds like English prose written by a Russian who knows the language but is not completely at home in it. The advantage is that Wettlin misses hardly any cultural detail."

In In Quest Of Tolstoy (2008), Hughes McLean devotes a full chapter ("Which English Anna?") comparing different translations of Anna Karenina. His conclusion, after comparing seven translations, is that "the PV [Pevear and Volokhonsky] translation, while perfectly adequate, is in my view not consistently or unequivocally superior to others in the market." He states his recommendations in the last two pages of the survey: "None of the existing translations is actively bad ... One's choice ... must therefore be based on nuances, subtleties, and refinements." He eliminates the Maudes for "disturbing errors" and "did not find either the Margashack or Carmichael ever superior to the others, and the lack of notes is a drawback." On Edmonds's version he states: "her version has no notes at all and all too frequently errs in the direction of making Tolstoy's 'robust awkwardness' conform to the translator's notion of good English style."

McLean's recommendations are the Kent–Berberova revision of Garnett's translation and the Pevear and Volokhonsky version. "I consider the GKB [Garnett–Kent–Berberova] a very good version, even though it is based on an out-of-date Russian text. Kent and Berberova did a much more thorough and careful revision of Garnett's translation than Gibian did of the Maude one, and they have supplied fairly full notes, conveniently printed at the bottom of the page." McLean takes Pevear and Volokhonsky to task for not using the best critical text (the "Zaidenshnur–Zhdanov text") and offering flawed notes without consulting C.J. Turner's A Karenina Companion (1993), although he calls their version "certainly a good translation."

Reviewing the translations by Bartlett and Schwartz for The New York Times Book Review, Masha Gessen noted that each new translation of Anna Karenina ended up highlighting an aspect of Tolstoy's "variable voice" in the novel, and thus, "The Tolstoy of Garnett... is a monocled British gentleman who is simply incapable of taking his characters as seriously as they take themselves. Pevear and Volokhonsky... created a reasonable, calm storyteller who communicated in conversational American English. Rosamund Bartlett... creates an updated ironic-Brit version of Tolstoy. Marian Schwartz... has produced what is probably the least smooth-talking and most contradictory Tolstoy yet." Gessen found Schwartz's translation to be formally closer to the original Russian, but often weighed down with details as a result; and found Bartlett's translation, like Pevear and Volokhonsky's, to be rendered in more idiomatic English and more readable.

=== Anna Karenin ===
The title has been translated as both Anna Karenin and Anna Karenina. The first instance eschews the Russian practice of employing gender-specific forms of surnames, instead using the masculine form for all characters. The second is a direct transliteration of the actual Russian name. Russian author Vladimir Nabokov explains: "In Russian, a surname ending in a consonant acquires a final 'a' (except for the cases of such names that cannot be declined and except adjectives like OblonskAYA) when designating a woman." Since surnames are not gendered in English, proponents of the first convention—removing the Russian 'a' to naturalize the name into English—argue that it is more consistent with English naming practice, and should be followed in an English translation. Nabokov, for instance, recommends that "only when the reference is to a female stage performer should English feminise a Russian surname (following a French custom: la Pavlova, 'the Pavlova'). Ivanov's and Karenin's wives are Mrs Ivanov and Mrs Karenin in Britain and the US—not 'Mrs Ivanova' or 'Mrs Karenina'."

The practice favored by most translators, however, has been to allow Anna's actual Russian name to stand. Larissa Volokhonsky, herself a Russian, prefers the second option, as did Aylmer and Louise Maude, who lived in Russia for many years and were friends of Tolstoy. A handful of other translators, including Constance Garnett and Rosemary Edmonds, both non-Russians, prefer the first.

== Adaptations ==
The novel has been adapted into various media including opera, film, television, ballet, and radio drama. The first film adaptation was released in 1911 but has not survived.

=== Film and television ===
- 1911: Anna Karenina (1911 film), a Russian adaptation directed by Maurice André Maître
- 1914: Anna Karenina (1914 film), a Russian adaptation directed by Vladimir Gardin
- 1915: Anna Karenina (1915 film), an American version starring Danish actress Betty Nansen
- 1918: Anna Karenina (1918 film), a Hungarian adaptation starring Irén Varsányi as Anna Karenina
- 1927: Love (1927 film), an American version, starring Greta Garbo and directed by Edmund Goulding. This version featured significant changes from the novel and had two different endings, with a happy one for American audiences
- 1935: Anna Karenina (1935 film), starring Greta Garbo and Fredric March; directed by Clarence Brown
- 1948: Anna Karenina (1948 film) starring Vivien Leigh and Ralph Richardson; directed by Julien Duvivier
- 1953: Anna Karenina (1953 film), a Russian version directed by Tatyana Lukashevich
- 1953: Panakkaari (Rich woman), a Tamil language adaptation directed by K. S. Gopalakrishnan, starring T. R. Rajakumari, M. G. Ramachandran and V. Nagayya.
- 1960: Nahr al-Hob (The River of Love), an Egyptian film directed by Ezz El-Dine Zulficar, starring Omar Sharif and Faten Hamama.
- 1961: Anna Karenina (1961 film), a BBC Television adaptation directed by Rudolph Cartier, starring Claire Bloom and Sean Connery.
- 1967: Anna Karenina (1967 film), a Russian version directed by Alexander Zarkhi
- 1977: Anna Karenina, a 1977 ten-episode BBC series, directed by Basil Coleman and starred Nicola Pagett, Eric Porter and Stuart Wilson
- 1975/1979: Anna Karenina (1975 film), film of the Bolshoi Ballet production, directed by Margarita Pilikhina, first released in Finland in 1976. U.S. release in 1979
- 1985: Anna Karenina (1985 film), a TV Movie starring Jacqueline Bisset and Christopher Reeve, directed by Simon Langton
- 1997: Anna Karenina (1997 film), the first American version filmed entirely in Russia, directed by Bernard Rose and starring Sophie Marceau and Sean Bean
- 2000: Anna Karenina (2000 TV series), a British version by David Blair and starring Helen McCrory and Kevin McKidd
- 2012: Anna Karenina (2012 film), a British version by Joe Wright from a screenplay by Tom Stoppard, starring Keira Knightley and Jude Law
- 2013: it:Anna Karenina (miniserie televisiva 2013), an English-language Italian/French/Spanish/German/Lithuanian TV co-production by Christian Duguay and starring Vittoria Puccini, Benjamin Sadler and Santiago Cabrera; alternatively presented as a two-part mini-series or a single 3 hours and 15 minutes film
- 2015: The Beautiful Lie (2015 miniseries), an Australian contemporary re-imagining of Anna Karenina, by Glendyn Ivin and Peter Salmon starring Sarah Snook, Rodger Corser, Benedict Samuel, Sophie Lowe
- 2017: Anna Karenina: Vronsky's Story, a Russian adaption directed by Karen Shakhnazarov
- 2023: Volver a caer, a Mexican version by Almudena Ocaña and Aurora García Tortosa, starring Kate del Castillo, Maxi Iglesias and Rubén Zamora.

=== Theatre ===
- 1992: Helen Edmundson adapted Anna Karenina for a production by Shared Experience which toured around the UK and internationally; Edmundson won a Time Out Award and a TMA Award
- 1992: Anna Karenina, musical with book and lyrics by Peter Kellogg and music by Daniel Levine. Opened on Broadway at Circle in the Square, August 26, 1992; closed October 4, 1992 after 18 previews and 46 performances.

=== Ballet ===
- 1979: Anna Karenina, choreography by André Prokovsky, with music by Tchaikovsky
- 2005: Anna Karenina, choreography by Boris Eifman, with music by Tchaikovsky
- 2019: Anna Karenina, choreography by Yuri Possokhov, with music from Ilya Demutsky

=== Radio ===
- 1949: The MGM Theater of the Air, starring Marlene Dietrich and directed by Marx Loeb

=== Opera ===
- 1978 Anna Karenina, composed by Iain Hamilton
- 2007 Anna Karenina, composed by David Carlson

== See also ==
- Anna Karenina principle
- Leo Tolstoy bibliography
