= Mikhail Tarkhanov (actor) =

Russian actor and theatre director

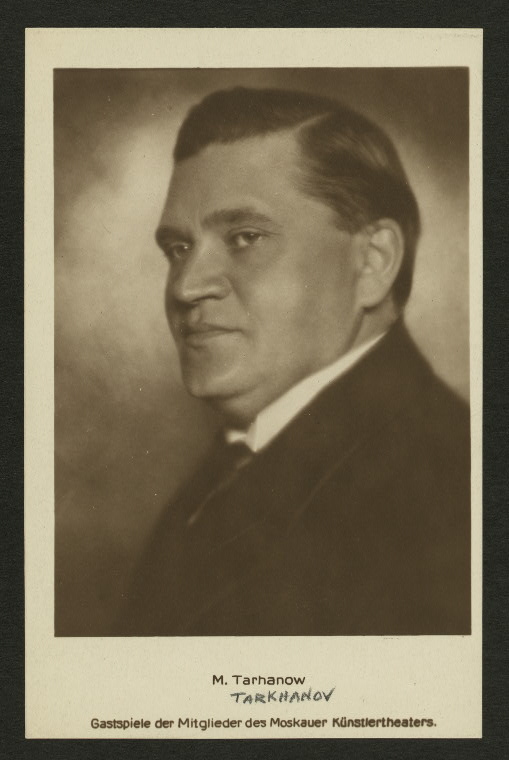
- Born: Mikhail Mikhaylovich Moskvin; 19 September 1877; Moscow, Russian Empire
- Died: 18 August 1948 (aged 70); Leningrad, Russian SFSR, Soviet Union
- Occupations: stage actor, theatre director, pedagogue
- Awards: The Order of Lenin (1938, 1947), The Order of the Red Banner of Labour (1937), Stalin Prize (1943)

Mikhail Mikhaylovich Moskvin (Russian: Михаил Михайлович Москвин; 19 September 1877, in Moscow, Imperial Russia – 18 August 1948, in Moscow, USSR) was a Russian and Soviet stage actor and theatre director, better known by his stage name Mikhail Tarkhanov (Тарханов).

Having made his stage debut in 1898 on stage the Ryazan Theatre, he performed in numerous troupes (including those led by Nikolai Sinelnikov and Vasily Kachalov) before joining the Moscow Art Theatre in 1922 where he soon became one of the leading actors and, in the late 1920s, a stage director. In 1935 he started to teach drama and in 1942-1948 was the head of Russian Academy of Theatre Arts.

In 1937 Tarkhanov was awarded the prestigious People's Artist of the USSR title. He was the recipient on numerous high-profile Soviet state awards, including the Order of Lenin (1838, 1947) and the Order of the Red Banner of Labour (1937) as well as the Stalin Prize laureate (1943, 1st Grade).

In 1923-1937 he was cast in 9 films, most of them the Russian classics adaptations, including Raskolnikow, The Storm (1933), The Youth of Maxim (1934), Dubrovsky (1936) and Pyotr Pervyy (1937).

The actor Ivan Moskvin was his younger brother.
