= Anna Karenina (1914 film) =

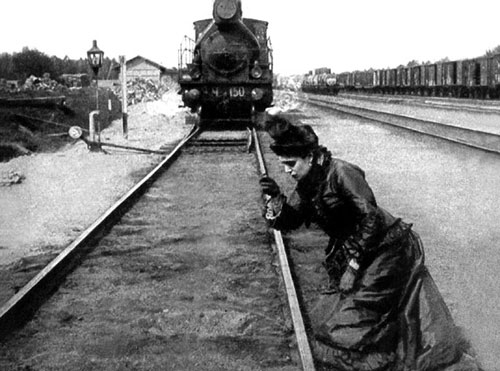
- Scene from the movie
- Russian: Анна Каренина
- Directed by: Vladimir Gardin
- Written by: Vladimir Gardin; Leo Tolstoy
- Based on: Anna Karenina; 1878 novel by Leo Tolstoy
- Starring: Maria Germanova; Vladimir Shaternikov; Mikhail Tamarov; Zoya Barantsevich; V. Obolensky; Vladimir Kvanin; Moreva; Vera Kholodnaya
- Cinematography: Aleksandr Levitsky
- Release date: October 7, 1914
- Country: Russian Empire

Anna Karenina (Russian: Анна Каренина) is a 1914 Russian drama film directed and written by Vladimir Gardin.

== Plot ==
The film is based on the 1878 novel by Leo Tolstoy.

== Cast ==
- Maria Germanova as Anna Karenina
- Vladimir Shaternikov as Karenin
- Mikhail Tamarov as Vronsky
- Zoya Barantsevich as Kittie
- V. Obolensky as Levin
- Vladimir Kvanin as Stiva Oblonsky
- Moreva as Dolly
- Vera Kholodnaya as Italian wet-nurse (uncredited)

== Interesting facts ==
The film is 2700 meters long.

A one-part excerpt from the film has been preserved.
