= James Durkin (actor) =

American stage and film actor and director

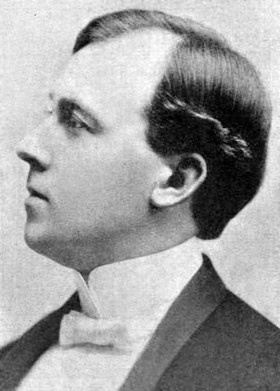
- Durkin in 1903
- Born: James Peter Durkin; May 21, 1876; Quebec, Canada
- Died: March 12, 1934 (aged 57); Los Angeles, California, U.S.
- Resting place: Hollywood Forever Cemetery
- Education: De La Salle College
- Occupations: Actor, director
- Years active: 1906–1934
- Spouse(s): "Mrs. Durkin" (m.?–div. 1904); Maude Fealy (m.1909–div.1917); Alice (Naylor) Durkin

James Durkin (May 21, 1876 – March 12, 1934) was a Canadian-American actor and director of the stage and screen.

== Biography ==
He was born in Quebec on May 21, 1876. Durkin's father was a Commissioner of Crown Lands for the province of Quebec. He was a graduate of De La Salle College in Toronto.

In 1904, he was part of a theater company in San Francisco, until his contract was terminated after it was revealed that he had been having an affair with Frances Starr, another member of the company; Durkin then abandoned his wife and "left [San Francisco] for the East".

In 1906, he made his Broadway debut in the play Julie Bonbon. The following year, he played the male lead in the play Margaret Fleming at Chicago's New Theatre.

While working on Broadway, he met actress Maude Fealy and became her second husband on November 28, 1909. They divorced in 1917. According to the Internet Broadway Database, he acted in six Broadway productions from 1906 to 1923 and directed Chivalry (1925–1926). (Note: Before making an entry into film work, Durkin had been able to work in stage productions as a leading actor and as a manager for theater companies.)

After several years on the stage, Durkin moved into film. He worked for the Thanhouser Company from late spring 1913 to 1914, acting and directing his wife. When Fealy and Durkin left Thanhouser, the trade journal Variety speculated that the couple planned to start a film company of their own. In June 1915, he signed on with the Famous Players Film Company as a director. In December of the same year, Durkin left Famous-Players, signing a two-year contract with Lewis J. Selznick's Equitable Pictures. (Note: Durkin was actually under contract to Paramount Pictures, but on loan to Famous Players. Paramount had him under contract until May of 1916.)

He continued working in film into the 1930s. He had two daughters, Alice Louise (born 1921) and Margaret Jane (born 1927), with his third wife, Alice Naylor.

He died on March 12, 1934, in Los Angeles, California.

== Filmography ==
=== Actor ===
- The Junior Partner (1913, Short) – The Junior Partner
- The Chasm (1914, Short) – The Burglar
- Shadow of the Law (1930) – Prison Warden
- Fighting Caravans (1931) – Minor Role (uncredited)
- The Conquering Horde (1931) – Amos Corley
- Bare Knees (1931, Short)
- Gun Smoke (1931) – J.K. Horton
- The Vice Squad (1931) – Second Magistrate
- An American Tragedy (1931) – Minor Role (uncredited)
- Alexander Hamilton (1931) – Second Ex-Soldier (uncredited)
- Flying High (1931) – Mr. Rankin – Detective (uncredited)
- Nice Women (1931) – Mr. Girard
- The Secret Witness (1931) – Detective (uncredited)
- The House of Mystery (1931, Short) – John Craig
- South of the Rio Grande (1932) – Señor Ruiz
- Shopworn (1932) – District Attorney
- Scarface (1932) – Newspaper Man (uncredited)
- Wild Girl (1932) – Madison Clay (uncredited)
- If I Had a Million (1932) – Glidden Associate (uncredited)
- Song of the Eagle (1933) – Businessman / Customer (uncredited)
- The Big Cage (1933) – Silas Warner
- Secret of the Blue Room (1933) – Kruger, the commissioner's assistant
- The Power and the Glory (1933) – Board of Directors (uncredited)
- Devil's Mate (1933) – Warden
- The Perils of Pauline (1933, Serial) – Prof. Hargrave
- This Side of Heaven (1934) – Raymond – Company Man (uncredited)
- Heat Lightning (1934) – The Sheriff
- Uncertain Lady (1934) – Mr. Weston (replaced by C. Montague Shaw) (scenes deleted)
- Glamour (1934) – Doctor (uncredited)
- Upper World (1934) – Detective (uncredited)
- The Vanishing Shadow (1934, Serial) – Prof. Carl Van Dorn (final film role)

=== Director ===
- Peggy's Invitation (1913, Short)
- When the Wheels of Justice Clogged (1914, Short)
- Remorse (1914, Short)
- The Outlaw's Nemesis (1914, Short)
- Jean of the Wilderness (1914, Short)
- Old Jackson's Girl (1914, Short)
- The Chasm (1914, Short)
- Pawns of Fate (1914, Short)
- The Adventures of a Good Fellow (1914, Short)
- The Celebrated Scandal (1915)
- Big Brother Bill (1915, Short)
- The Running Fight (1915)
- The Incorrigible Dukane (1915, Short)
- The Mummy and the Hummingbird (1915)
- The Clarion (1916)
- Who Killed Simon Baird? (1916)
- The Red Widow (1916 short)

== General references ==
- Hines, Dixie; Hanaford, Harry Prescott, eds. (1914). "James Durkin". Who's Who in Music and Drama. New York: Hanaford. p. 105.
