= Anna Karenina (1911 film) =

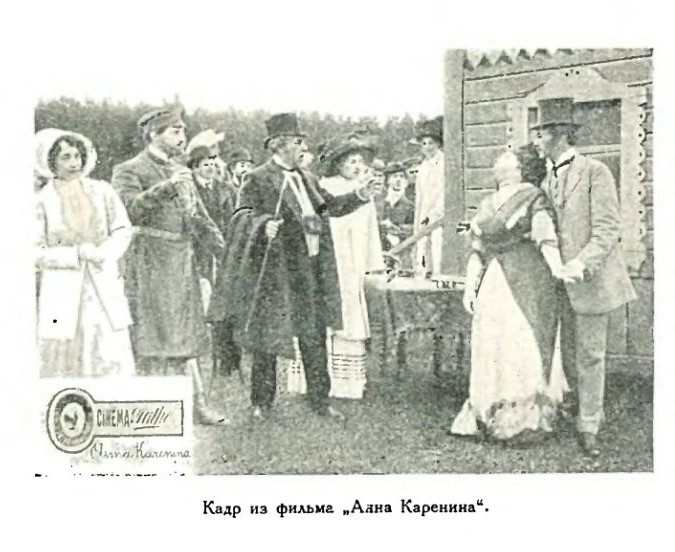
- Russian: Анна Каренина
- Directed by: Maurice Maître
- Written by: Leo Tolstoy
- Based on: Anna Karenina; 1878 novel by Leo Tolstoy
- Starring: Maria Sorochtina; M. Trojanov; Nikolai Vasilyev
- Cinematography: Joseph-Louis Mundwiller
- Production company: Bratja Pate
- Release date: February 10, 1911; Denmark
- Running time: 15 min.
- Country: Russian Empire
- Language: Silent

Anna Karenina (Russian: Анна Каренина) was a 1911 Russian short film directed by Maurice Maître.

== Plot ==
A Dutch print of Anna Karenina

The film was based on the 1878 novel Anna Karenina by Leo Tolstoy.

Countess Anna Karenina vacillates between her lover, Vronsky, and her husband, Count Karenin. Anna's love for Vronsky causes her great pain and social pressure. Vronsky wants Anna to leave her husband, but Vronsky soon goes off to war, rendering her helpless. Anna feels lonely, begins to lose her mind, and eventually throws herself in front of a train.

== Cast ==
- M. Sorochtina as Anna Karenina
- M. Trojanov as Karenin
- Nikolai Vasilyev as Vronsky
- Mamonova
- A. Veskov
- Nikolai Vekov

== Critical response ==
Lev Anninsky: The typically French direction of Maitre and the performance of Vasilyev, who persistently imitated French actors, must have greatly narrowed the psychological range of this picture. It didn't turn out to be a masterpiece.
