= Anna Karenina (1953 film) =

1953 film by Tatyana Lukashevich

- Directed by: Tatyana Lukashevich
- Written by: Nikolay Volkov
- Based on: Anna Karenina; 1878 novel by Leo Tolstoy
- Starring: Alla Tarasova; Nikolai Sosnin; Pavel Massalsky
- Cinematography: Semyon Shejnin; Nikolai Vlasov
- Music by: Boris Izralevsky
- Production company: Mosfilm
- Release date: 1953
- Running time: 165 minutes
- Country: Soviet Union
- Language: Russian

Anna Karenina is a 1953 Soviet historical drama film directed by Tatyana Lukashevich and starring Alla Tarasova, Nikolai Sosnin and Pavel Massalsky. It is based on Leo Tolstoy's 1878 novel Anna Karenina.

== Plot summary ==
The romance of a married woman, Anna Karenina, and a young officer, Vronsky. Anna leaves her family in search of happiness with her beloved. She has to take a very serious step in her life - part with her son. The attitude of high society towards her changes. All this brings a lot of pain and humiliation to the main character. Having never found happiness and not having come to terms with her situation, at the end of the film Anna throws herself under a train.

== Cast ==
- Alla Tarasova as Anna Arkadyevna Karenina
- Nikolai Sosnin as Aleksei Aleksandrovich Karenin
- Pavel Massalsky as Count Aleksei Kirillovich Vronsky
- Viktor Stanitsyn as Prince Stepan Arkadyevich Oblonsky
- Yevdokia Aleyeva as Darya Aleksandrovna Oblonskaya (Dolly)
- Aleksei Zakalinsky as Seryozha Karenin
- Angelina Stepanova as Princess Yelizaveta Feodorovna Tverskaya
- Mariya Durasova as Countess Lidiya Ivanovna
- Nina Slastenina as Countess Vronskaya
- Grigori Konsky as Count Aleksandr Kirillovich Vronsky
- Irina Gosheva as Varya Vronskaya
- Boris Petker as Attorney
- Yevgeniya Khovanskaya as Princess Myagkaya
- Sofiya Pilyavskaya as Ambassador's wife
- Nina Mikhalovskaya as Anna's friend
- Nikolai Svobodin as Diplomat
- Vladimir Kirillin as Tushkevich
- Vladimir Damsky as Karmasov
- Galina Shostko as Karmasova
- Sofya Garrel as Freylina
- Vasily Makarov as dignitary
- Vladimir Popov as Kapitonich, Karenina's butler
- Aleksei Zhiltsov as Kornei, Karenina's valet
- Valeriya Dementyeva as Mariya Yefimova
- Anna Kolomijtseva as Annushka

== Bibliography ==
- Goble, Alan. The Complete Index to Literary Sources in Film. Walter de Gruyter, 1999.
