= List of recipients of the Stalin Prize =

The State Stalin Prize, usually called the Stalin Prize, existed from 1941 to 1954, although some sources give a termination date of 1952. It essentially played the same role; therefore upon the establishment of the USSR State Prize, the diplomas and badges of the recipients of Stalin Prize were changed to that of USSR State Prize.

== Recipients of the Stalin Prize in science and engineering by year ==
=== 1941 ===
- Adela Rosenthal: mathematics
- Abram Alikhanov: physics
- Alexander E. Braunstein: biochemistry
- Nikolai Burdenko: neurosurgery
- Mikhail Gurevich: aeronautical engineering
- Sergey Ilyushin: aeronautical engineering
- Aleksandr Khinchin: mathematics
- Andrey Kolmogorov: mathematics
- Semyon Lavochkin: aeronautical engineering
- Mikhail Loginov: artillery design
- Trofim Lysenko: biology
- Dmitry Maksutov: astronomic optics
- Vladimir Obruchev: geology
- Evgeny Paton: electrical welding
- Nikolai Polikarpov: aeronautical engineering
- Nikolay Semyonov: chemical physics
- Sergei Sobolev: mathematics
- Alexey Shchusev: architecture
- Alexander Sergeyevich Yakovlev: aeronautical engineering
- Ivan Matveyevich Vinogradov: mathematics
- Semyon Volfkovich: chemistry
- Nikolai Ponomarev: astronomic optics
- Alexander Bogomolets: medicine

=== 1942 ===
- Aleksandr Danilovich Aleksandrov: mathematics
- Nicholas Astrov: tank engineer
- Ivan Grave: artillery, for his work Ballistics of Semiclosed Space
- Sergey Ilyushin: aeronautical engineering
- Mstislav Keldysh: mathematics
- Isaak Kikoin: physics
- Mikhail Koshkin: tank engineer
- Leonid Isaakovich Mandelstam: physics
- Sergei Rubinstein: psychology
- Aleksandr Aleksandrovich Shmuk: biochemistry
- Alexander Vishnevsky: surgeon
- Alexander Sergeyevich Yakovlev: aeronautical engineering
- Nikolay Zelinsky work on organic chemistry
- Ivan Bardin: metallurgist
- Ivan Plotnikov: inventor of artificial leather kirza
- Igor Kurchatov: physicist (1st degree; with a group of Ioffe Institute)

=== 1943 ===
- Nicholas Astrov: tank engineer
- Aleksandr Blagonravov: tank engineer
- Zinaida Vissarionovna Ermol'eva: biochemistry
- Sergey Ilyushin: aeronautical engineering
- Ivan Knunyants: chemistry
- Feodosy Krasovsky: astronomy
- Semyon Lavochkin: aeronautical engineering
- Nikolai Nikolaevich Polikarpov: aeronautical engineering
- Sergey Ivanovich Vavilov: physics
- Vladimir Vernadsky: mineralogy and geochemistry
- Yakov Zeldovich: 2nd degree, physics – for works on combustion and detonation
- Mustafa Topchubashov: general surgeon

=== 1944 ===
Laureates for this year were officially announced in 1946.

=== 1945 ===
Laureates for this year were officially announced in 1946

=== 1946 ===
- Pavel Alekseyevich Cherenkov: physics
- Saint Luke: Medicine
- Viktor Hambardzumyan: astrophysics
- Sergey Ilyushin: aeronautical engineering
- Mstislav Keldysh: mathematics
- Lev Landau: physics
- Semyon Lavochkin: aeronautical engineering
- Lazar Lyusternik: mathematics
- Dmitri Maksutov: 1st degree, astronomic optics
- Anatoly Ivanovich Malcev: 2nd degree, for the research on Lie groups
- Vasily Sergeevich Nemchinov: mathematics
- Pelageya Polubarinova-Kochina: mathematics
- Alexander Sergeyevich Yakovlev: aeronautical engineering
- Sergey Ivanovich Vavilov: physics
- Leo Silber: immunology
- Yevgeny Tarle: historian
- Boris Zbarsky: biochemistry
- Nikolay Zelinsky: work on chemistry of proteins
- Konstantin Petrzhak and Georgy Flyorov: physics (2nd degree; for discovery of spontaneous fission)
- Mark Veyngerov for developing of Express Optic-Acoustical Gas Analysis.
- Valentin Felixovich Voyno-Yasenetsky: medicine
- Anatoly Savin: technology
- Yusif Mammadaliyev: chemistry
- Aliashraf Abdulhuseyn oglu Alizade: geologist
- Natalia Uzhviy: actress
- Vyacheslav Lebedinsky: chemist
- Nikolai Rakov: music

=== 1947 ===
- Manfred von Ardenne: for a table-top electron microscope
- Georgy Beriev: aeronautical engineering
- Nikolay Bogolyubov: mathematics
- Grigory Eisenberg: radiocommunication engineer
- Mikhail Gurevich: aeronautical engineering
- Sergey Ilyushin: aeronautical engineering
- Artem Mikoyan: aeronautical engineering
- Alexander Sergeyevich Yakovlev: aeronautical engineering
- Alexei Vasilievich Shubnikov: 2nd degree, for the discovery and study of a new type of piezoelectrics, the results of which are set out in the monograph "Piezoelectric textures" (1946)

=== 1948 ===
- Yekaterina Alexandrovna Ankinovich: 3rd degree, for "geological research and development of the Nikolaevsky polymetal deposit"
- Nikolai Bernstein: neurophysiology
- Alexander Gapeev: geology
- Mikhail Gurevich: aeronautical engineering
- Artem Mikoyan: aeronautical engineering
- Arseny Mironov: aeronautical engineering
- Semyon Lavochkin: aeronautical engineering
- Alexander Sergeyevich Yakovlev: aeronautical engineering

=== 1949 ===
- Mikhail Gurevich: aircraft engineering
- Anna Gelman: engineering
- Mikhail Kalashnikov: engineering
- Leonid Kantorovich: mathematics
- Boris Kurchatov: radiochemistry
- Artem Mikoyan: aircraft engineering
- Nikolaus Riehl: first class, for contributions to the Soviet atomic bomb project
- Yakov Borisovich Zel'dovich (Яков Борисович Зельдович): 1st degree, physics – for special works (actually, for nuclear technology)
- Anatoly Savin
- Max Taitz: aircraft flight testing
- Natalia Uzhviy: actress

=== 1950 ===
- Viktor Hambardzumyan: astrophysics
- Sergey Ilyushin: aeronautical engineering
- Vladimir Obruchev: geology
- Aleksei Pogorelov: mathematics
- Dmitri Skobeltsyn: physics
- Ilia Vekua: mathematics
- Alexei Vasilievich Shubnikov: 3rd degree, for the development of equipment and technology for the production of rubies

=== 1951 ===
- Heinz Barwich: 2nd degree, physics
- Gustav Ludwig Hertz: 2nd degree, physics
- Yuri Krutkov: 2nd degree, physics
- Anatoly Savin
- Peter Adolf Thiessen: 1st degree, for uranium enrichment techniques
- Boris Vannikov: administration of Soviet nuclear program
- Sergey Ivanovich Vavilov: physics
- Viktor Vinogradov: philology
- Yakov Borisovich Zel'dovich: 1st degree, physics – for special works
- Pavel Iosifovich Androsov: 2nd degree, medicine – for the anastomotic coupler
- Vladimir Veksler: physics
- Natalia Uzhviy: actress

=== 1952 ===
- Pavel Cherenkov: physics
- Sergey Ilyushin: aeronautical engineering
- Feodosy Krasovsky: astronomer and geodesist
- Leon Theremin: science for inventing eavesdropping equipment
- Sergey Ivanovich Vavilov: physics
- Ivan Efremov, for Taphonomy and Geological Chronology
- Gury Savin: 2nd degree, for the monograph Stress Concentration around Holes
- Ilya Ilyich Chernyaev: 1st degree, chemistry
- Boris K. Schischkin and two others; for the Flora of the USSR
- Lev Landau, Naum Meiman, Isaak Khalatnikov: 2nd degree, calculations for the atomic bomb project
- Sergey Mergelyan: mathematics

=== 1953 ===
- Manfred von Ardenne: 1st degree, for contributions to the Soviet atomic bomb project
- Nikolay Bogolyubov: physics
- Vitaly Ginzburg: 1st degree, physics
- Eduard Haken: music
- Bruno Pontecorvo: physics
- Max Taitz: cruise missiles flight testing
- Vasily Vladimirov: mathematics
- Yakov Borisovich Zel'dovich: 1st degree, physics – for special works
- Dmitri Lyudvigovich Tomashevich: aircraft design
- Ivan Kartashev: metalworker of the Economizer plant

=== 1954 ===
- Andrei Sakharov: 1st degree, physics
- V. Alexandrov (Александров В. В.), Yu. Bazilevsky (Базилевский Ю. Я.), D. Zhuchkov (Жучков Д. А.), I. Lygin (Лыгин И. Ф.), G. Markov (Марков Г. Я.), B. Melnikov (Мельников Б. Ф.), G. Prokudayev (Прокудаев Г. М.), B. Rameyev, N. Trubnikov (Трубников Н. Б.), A. Tsygankin (Цыганкин А. П.), Yu. Shcherbakov (Щербаков Ю. Ф.) and L. Larionova (Ларионова Л.А.) – Strela computer development team: 1st degree
- Igor Tamm: physics
- Igor Kurchatov: physics

== Recipients of the Stalin Prize in literature and arts by year ==
=== 1941 ===
- Grigori Aleksandrov, Isaak Dunayevsky, and Lyubov Orlova: film Circus (1936)
- Grigori Aleksandrov, Nikolai Erdman, Isaak Dunayevsky, Lyubov Orlova, and Igor Ilyinsky: film Volga-Volga (1938)
- Hamo Beknazarian, Avet Avetisyan, and Hrachia Nersisyan: film Zangezur (1938)
- Mikheil Chiaureli and Spartak Bagashvili: film Arsena (1937)
- Mikheil Chiaureli and Mikheil Gelovani: film The Great Dawn (1938)
- Mark Donskoy and Varvara Massalitinova: films The Childhood of Maxim Gorky (1938) and On His Own (1939)
- Alexander Dovzhenko, Yevgeny Samoylov, and Ivan Skuratov: film Shchors (1939)
- Efim Dzigan: film The Sailors of Kronstadt (1936)
- Efim Dzigan and Vsevolod Vishnevsky: film If War Comes Tomorrow (1938)
- Sergei Eisenstein, Pyotr Pavlenko, Nikolai Cherkasov, and Andrei Abrikosov: film Alexander Nevsky (1938)
- Fridrikh Ermler, Nikolay Bogolyubov, and Aleksandr Zrazhevsky: film The Great Citizen (1938–1939)
- Sergei Gerasimov and Tamara Makarova: film The New Teacher (1939)
- Yevgeni Ivanov-Barkov, Alty Karliyev, and Nina Alisova: film Dursun (1941)
- Iosif Kheifits and Aleksandr Zarkhi: film Baltic Deputy (1937)
- Oleksandr Korniychuk: for Ukrainian plays Platon Krechet (1934) and Bohdan Khmelnytskyi (1939)
- Grigori Kozintsev, Leonid Trauberg, and Boris Chirkov: films The Youth of Maxim (1935), The Return of Maxim (1937), and The Vyborg Side (1939)
- Leonid Lukov and Pavel Nilin: film A Great Life (Part I) (1940)
- Vladimir Petrov, Nikolai Simonov, and Mikhail Zharov: film Peter the First (1937–1938)
- Vsevolod Pudovkin, Mikhail Doller, Boris Livanov, and Aleksandr Khanov: film Minin and Pozharsky (1939)
- Vsevolod Pudovkin, Mikhail Doller, Nikolai Cherkasov-Sergeyev, and Aleksandr Khanov: film Suvorov (1941)
- Ivan Pyryev, Nikolai Kryuchkov, and Marina Ladynina: film Tractor-Drivers (1939)
- Yuli Raizman, Ivan Peltser, and Nikolai Dorokhin: film Last Night (1937)
- Gerbert Rappaport, Aleksandr Ivanovsky, Sergei Lemeshev, and Erast Garin: film Musical Story (1940)
- Mikhail Romm, Aleksei Kapler, Boris Shchukin, and Nikolai Okhlopkov: films Lenin in October (1937) and Lenin in 1918 (1939)
- Nikoloz Shengelaia: film Eliso (1928)
- Nikoloz Shengelaia and Nato Vachnadze: film Orange Valley (1937)
- Georgi Vasilyev, Sergei Vasilyev, and Boris Babochkin: film Chapaev (1939)
- Sergei Yutkevich and Leonid Lyubashevsky: film Yakov Sverdlov (1940)
- Aleksandr Zguridi, Gleb Troyanski, and Boris Dolin: documentary film In the Depths of the Sea (1938)
- Aleksandr Zguridi and Gleb Troyanski: documentary film Force of Life (1940)
- Ilya Kopalin: documentary film On Danube (1940)
- Uzeyir Hajibeyov: Ker oghlu, opera
- Aram Khachaturian: Violin Concerto
- Nikolai Myaskovsky: Symphony No. 21
- Mark Reizen: opera singer, bass
- Sergei Sergeyev-Tsensky: literature
- Yuri Shaporin: On the Field of Kulikovo, cantata
- Dmitri Shostakovich: Piano Quintet
- Aleksey Shchusev: architecture
- Mikhail Aleksandrovich Sholokhov: literature
- Aleksey Nikolayevich Tolstoy: literature, for Peter I
- Aleksandr Tvardovsky: literature
- Olga Lepeshinskaya: ballet
- Vera Mukhina: sculptor
- Natalia Shpiller: opera singer
- Samad Vurgun: poet, dramatist; for Vagif play

=== 1942 ===
- Tikhon Khrennikov: music to the film The Swineherd and the Shepherd
- Dmitri Shostakovich: Symphony No. 7
- Ilya Ehrenburg: literature
- David Fyodorovich Oistrakh: violinist

=== 1943 ===
- Wanda Wasilewska, for her novel The Rainbow
- Mukhtar Ashrafi: Symphony No. 1 Heroic
- Aram Khachaturian: Gayaneh Ballet
- Sergei Prokofiev: Piano Sonata No. 7
- Vissarion Shebalin: String Quartet No. 5
- Aleksey Nikolayevich Tolstoy: literature, for The Road to Calvary
- Pavel Bazhov: literature, for The Malachite Box
- Margarita Aliger: for poetry, Zoya

=== 1944 ===
The awards for this year were given in 1946

=== 1945 ===
The awards for this year were given in 1946

=== 1946 ===
- Rza Tahmasib: cinema, for The Cloth-Peddler (Arshin Mal Alan) film
- Rashid Behbudov: singer and actor, for Asker role in Arshin Mal Alan
- Arnold Azrikan: dramatic tenor, Otello
- Sergei Aslamazyan: cellist
- Mikola Bazhan: literature, for In the Days of War (1945?)
- Yuri Bilibin: geology
- Sergei Eisenstein, Sergei Prokofiev, Eduard Tisse, Andrei Moskvin, Nikolay Cherkasov, Serafima Birman: cinema, for Ivan the Terrible, Part I
- Alexander Fadeyev: literature, for The Young Guard (1st edition, 1945)
- Samuil Feinberg: Piano Concerto No. 2
- Emil Gilels: pianist
- Reinhold Glière: Concerto for voice and orchestra
- Dmitri Kabalevsky: String Quartet No. 2
- Gara Garayev: The Motherland, opera
- Jovdat Hajiyev: The Motherland, opera
- Veniamin Kaverin: literature, for The Two Captains
- Aram Khachaturian: Symphony No. 2
- Tikhon Khrennikov: At 6 p.m. after the War, music from the film
- Boris Liatoshinsky: Ukrainian Quintet
- Samuil Marshak: literature, for the play Twelve Months
- Peretz Markish: literature
- Vera Inber: poetry
- Sulamith Messerer: ballet choreography
- Nikolai Miaskovsky: String Quartet No. 9 – Cello Concerto
- Vano Muradeli: Symphony No. 2
- Vera Panova: literature, for Sputniki
- Gavriil Nikolayevich Popov: Symphony No. 2
- Sergei Orlov: Sculpture
- Sergei Prokofiev: Symphony No. 5 – Piano Sonata No. 8 – Cinderella Ballet
- Alexander Prokofyev: poetry, for the 1944 poem "Rossiya"
- Yuri Shaporin: Story of the Battle for the Russian Land
- Andrei Shtogarenko: My Ukraine, symphony
- Georgi Sviridov: Piano Trio
- Aleksey Shchusev: architecture
- Vikenty Veresaev: literature
- Yevgeny Vuchetich: sculpture
- Stepan Malkhasyants: philologist, for Armenian Explanatory Dictionary
- Boris Gorbatov: literature
- Eugen Kapp: music composition

=== 1947 ===
- Salomėja Nėris: poetry (posthumously)
- Sergei Prokofiev: Sonata No. 1 for violin and piano
- Vissarion Shebalin: Moscow, cantata
- Sergey Nikiforovich Vasilenko: Mirandoline Suite
- Vera Panova: literature, for Kruzhilikha
- Aleksandr Tvardovsky: literature
- Yevgeny Vuchetich, sculpture
- Andrey Vyshinsky: Theory of Judicial Proofs
- Pyotr Pavlenko: literature, for Happiness
- Mikhail Bubennov: literature, for The White Birch

=== 1948 ===
- Boris Asafiev: Monograph on Glinka
- Reinhold Glière: String Quartet No. 4
- Gara Garayev: Leyli and Majnun, symphonic poem
- Ilya Ehrenburg: literature
- Anatoly Rybakov: literature, for The Dagger
- Aleksey Shchusev, architecture
- Volodymyr Sosyura: poetry
- Nikolai Virta
- Yevgeny Vuchetich: sculpture
- The crew of the film Secret Agent
- Zinovy Moiseevich Vilensky: sculpture
- Vladimir Fedorovich Popov: literature, for Steel and Slag
- Arkady Filippenko: music, for Second String Quartet
- Adil Isgandarov: theatre and film director, actor

=== 1949 ===
- Fikret Amirov: Symphonic Mughams
- Alexander Arutiunian: The Motherland, cantata
- Vasiliy Nikolaevich Azhaev: literature, for Far From Moscow
- Fyodor Fedorovsky: scenic design
- Sergei Gerasimov, Vladimir Rapoport, Vladimir Ivanov, Inna Makarova, Nonna Mordyukova, Sergei Gurzo, Lyudmila Shagalova, and Viktor Khokhryakov for the film The Young Guard (1948)
- Feodor Vasilyevich Gladkov: literature, for Story of My Childhood (1949?)
- Dmitri Kabalevsky: Violin Concerto
- Yuri Grigorievich Laptev: 3rd class, literature, for Zarya (1948)
- Mikhail Lukonin: "The Working Day", poem
- Vera Panova: literature, for The Bright Shore
- Faina Ranevskaya: for outstanding creative achievements on theater stage
- Ottilia Reizman: 2nd degree, for the film The Guardian of the World (1948)
- Fyodor Pavlovich Reshetnikov: art
- Sandro Shanshiashvili: for his poetry and plays
- Yevgeny Vuchetich: sculpture
- Ivan Vasilenko: literature, for The Little Star
- Tugolbay Sydykbekov: 3rd class, Kyrgyz writer of prose fiction, for his novel Bizdin zamandın kişileri ("People of our time", 1947)
- Eugen Kapp: music composition

=== 1950 ===
- Leonid Baratov: opera director
- Reinhold Glière: The Bronze Horseman
- Nikolai Myaskovsky: Sonata No. 2 for cello and piano
- Dmitri Shostakovich: Song of the Forests – The Fall of Berlin for chorus
- Yevgeny Vuchetich: sculpture
- Dimitri Arakishvili: composer
- Vadim Sobko: for the novel Guarantee of Peace
- Vasily Yefanov: painter
- Galiya Izmaylova: 2nd degree, ballerina
- Alykul Osmonov: poetry; for his efforts to modernize Kyrgyz literature
- Jahangir Jahangirov: composer, conductor and choirmaster
- Mirza Ibrahimov: writer, playwright
- Mehdi Huseyn: writer and critic; for Absheron novel (1947)
- Bulbul: opera tenor, folk music performer, and one of the founders of vocal arts and national musical theatre
- Sviatoslav Richter: musician
- Suleyman Rustam: for collection of poems Two shores

=== 1951 ===
- Osip Abdulov: 2nd degree, actor
- Arno Babadzhanian: Heroic Ballad
- Vladimir Belyayev: literature for The Old Fortress: A Trilogy
- Sergei Bondarchuk: Taras Shevchenko
- Nikolai Cherkasov: for the film Alexander Popov (the role of Alexander Popov).
- Isaak Dunaevsky: Music to the film The Kuban' Cossacks
- Gevorg Emin: book of poetry New Road
- Bruno Freindlich: for the film Alexander Popov (the role of Guglielmo Marconi).
- German Galynin: Epic Poem
- Edouard Grikurov: conductor (music)
- Aleksandras Gudaitis-Guzevičius, book Kalvio Ignoto teisybė (The truth of blacksmith Ignotas)
- Dmitri Kabalevsky: Taras's Family, opera
- Jan Kapr: New Czechoslovakia, film music
- Nikolai Myaskovsky: Symphony No. 27 – String Quartet No. 13
- Sergei Prokofiev: On Guard for Peace, oratorio
- Vsevolod Pudovkin, Anatoli Golovnya, Vissarion Shebalin, and Vladimir Belokurov: film Zhukovsky (1950)
- Faina Ranevskaya: for the film U nih est' Rodina (They Have Their Motherland)
- Ottilia Reizman: 3rd degree for the film Glory of Labor (1949)
- Fyodor Pavlovich Reshetnikov: art (second time)
- Anatoly Rybakov: literature
- Otar Taktakishvili: Symphony No. 1
- Teofilis Tilvytis, poem Usnynė
- Yuri Trifonov: literature, for Students
- Suleiman Yudakov: composer, musician (composed the Tajik National Anthem)
- Ding Ling: 2nd degree, literature for The Sun Shines Over Sanggan River
- Niyazi: conductor, and composer of the renowned symphonic mugam Rast
- Rasul Rza: literature
- Mstislav Rostropovich: musician

=== 1952 ===
- Ashot Satian: vocal-symphony poem Songs of Ararat Valley (1950)
- Jovdat Hajiyev: For Peace, symphonic poem
- Soltan Hajibeyov
- Mukhtar Ashrafi
- Pavel Necheporenko: distinguished performance on balalaika
- Yuri Shaporin: romances for voice and piano
- Dmitri Shostakovich: Ten Poems for Chorus opus 88
- Andrei Shtogarenko: In Memory of Lesya Ukrainka, symphonic suite
- Juhan Smuul: literature
- Otar Taktakishvili: Piano Concerto no 1
- Aleksey Shchusev: architecture
- Antanas Venclova: literature, Rinktinė (selected works)
- Viktor Arkadyevich Bely: music composition
- Eugen Kapp: music composition
- Silva Kaputikyan: literature
- Marie Podvalová: music performance
- André Stil: literature
