= Mahammadtaghi Aliyev =

- Azerbaijani: Məmmədtağı Əliyev
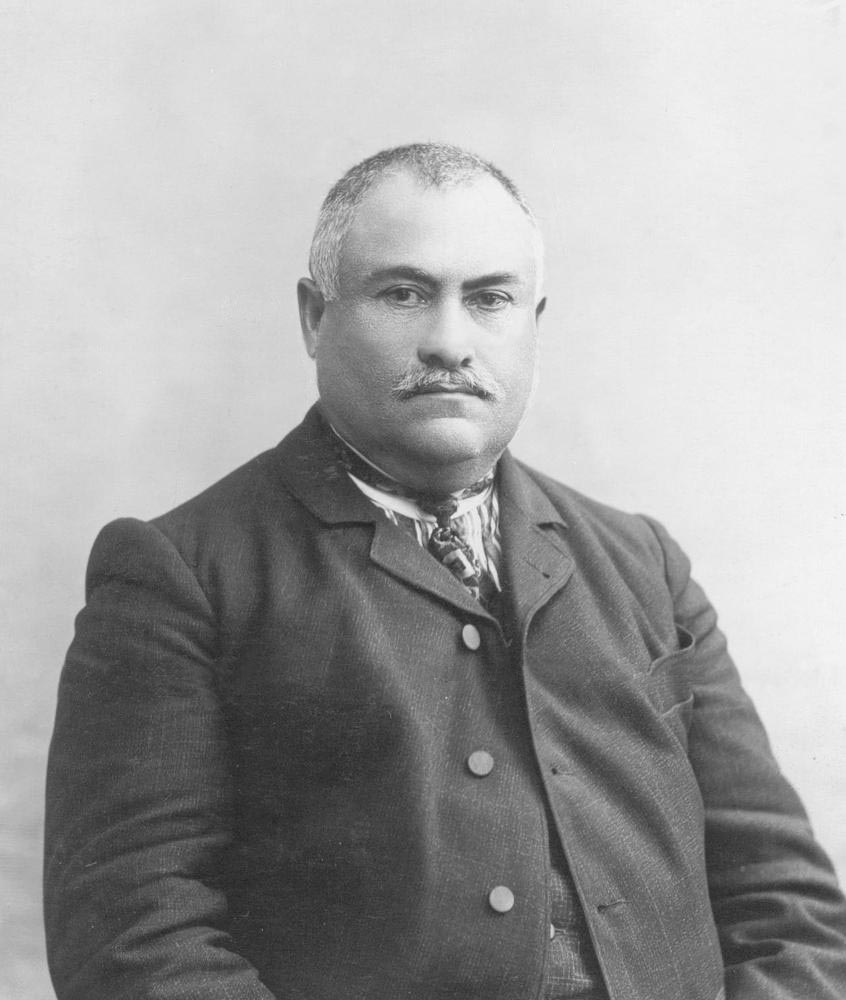
- Aliyev in 1906
- Politics, Member of the State Duma I of the Russian Empire
- In office 27 April 1906 – 9 July 1906
- In office 10 May 1906 – 22 July 1906

Personal details
- Born: January 10, 1858 Shamakhi, Russian Empire (now Azerbaijan)
- Died: 1918 (aged 59–60) Shamakhi, Azerbaijan Democratic Republic

Mahammadtaghi Aliyev, also known as Mahammadtaghi Alizadeh (January 10, 1858, Shamakhi – 1918, Shamakhi), was a public and political figure, economist, and publicist. He was one of the five Azerbaijanis elected to the First State Duma of the Russian Empire.

He was killed by Dashnaks during the Shamakhi massacre.

== Life ==
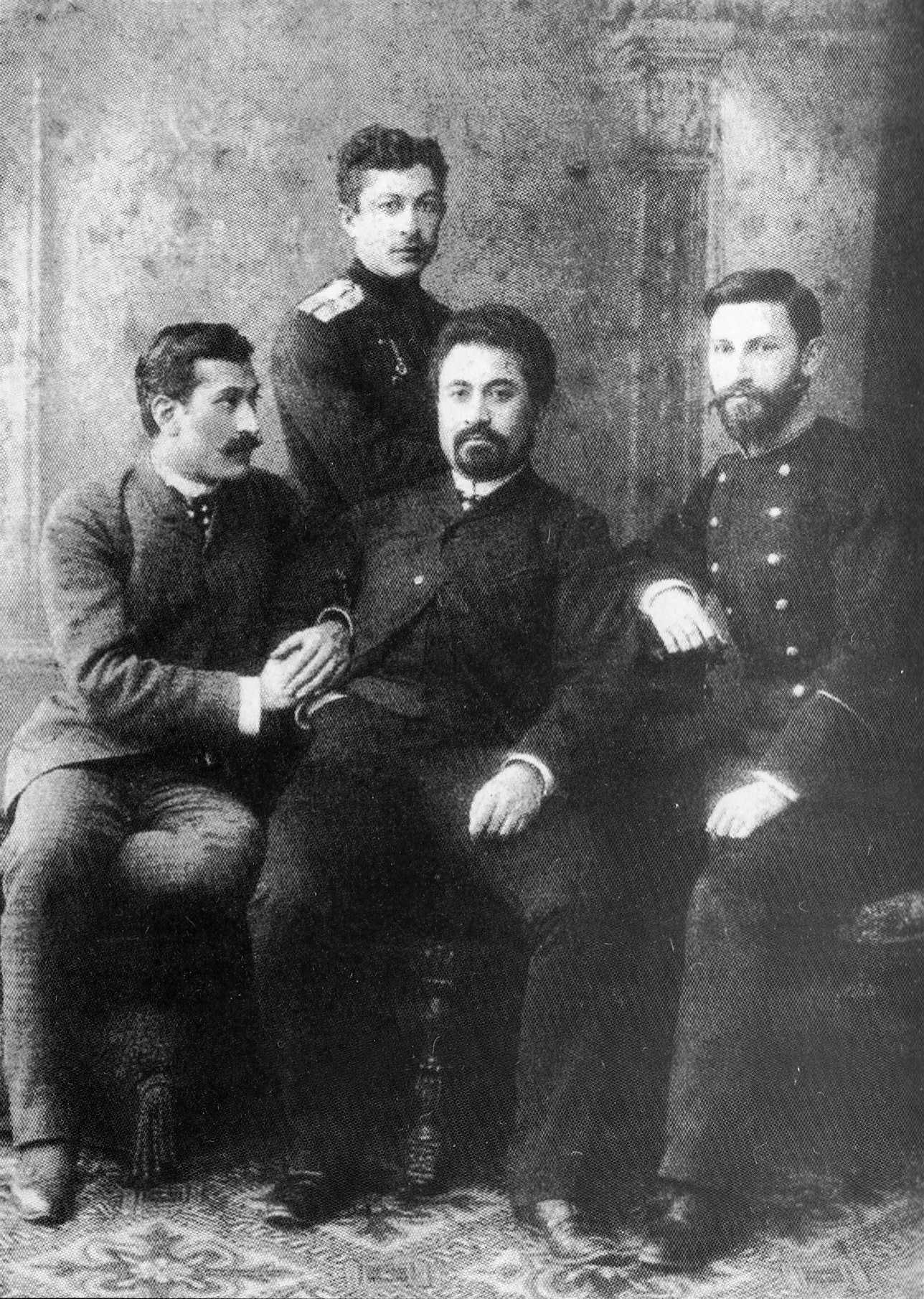
Those sitting from the left: his brother Mehdi Aliyev, Mammadtaghi Aliyev, Ali bey Huseynzade. Standing: Sadig bey Agabayzade (St. Petersburg, 1886)

Mammadtaghi Haji Abdussamad oghlu was born on January 10, 1858, in Shamakhi. From 1864 to 1868, he studied at a neighborhood school in Shamakhi, from 1868 to 1874 at a six-class school under the Caucasian Muslim Religious Administration in Tbilisi, and from 1874 to 1878 at a real school in Baku. After completing his secondary education, he pursued higher education at the Petrovsky-Razumovsky Agricultural and Forestry Academy in Moscow, specializing in agronomy and economics. During his time at the academy, he began engaging in political and literary activities and became a member of the Imdadiyya Society, established by Najaf bey Vazirov at the Petrovsky-Razumovsky Academy, at the initiative of Hasan bey Zardabi. He published articles in the newspaper "Akinchi" and other periodicals, using the pen name "Shirvani" in "Akinchi." To further his specialization, he traveled to Europe, living in France and Germany for a year, where he wrote and published a scientific work on the economy of the Silesian region.

From 1883 to 1888, he worked in the customs and duties department of the Russian Empire's Ministry of Finance. When Minister Rikhtern's reform projects faced resistance from the bureaucracy, he resigned along with other progressive officials and returned to Shamakhi, where he engaged in charitable activities. He traveled to Iran and, based on his observations, wrote a work similar to Z. Maragayi's novel "The Travels of Ibrahim Bey."

In 1904, he became one of the founders of the Hummet Party. In 1906, Mahammadtaghi Aliyev was elected as a deputy to the First State Duma of the Russian Empire from the Baku Governorate. As an economist, he sympathized with the Trudoviks party in the Duma and, as a member of the Muslim faction, supported the idea of national autonomy for non-Russian peoples. After the Duma was dissolved, he returned to Shamakhi and contributed to the city's public life by opening several schools. He was fluent in German, French, Arabic, Persian, and Russian.

During the days of the Shamakhi massacre, he did not leave the city. He was killed and burned as a result of an attack on his house by the Dashnaks. Later, his house was set on fire, and all the rare manuscripts and books in his library, including his own works on economics and agriculture, were destroyed.

== See also ==
- Aliashraf Abdulhuseyn oglu Alizade
