= Sheftel =

Sheftel (Hebrew: שפטל) can be both a middle name and a surname. Notable people with this name include:

- Shabtai Sheftel Horowitz (1565–1619), Czech Jewish author
- Aryeh Sheftel (1905–1980), Israeli politician
- Mikhail Isaakovich Sheftel (1862–1919), Russian Jewish lawyer
- Yoram Sheftel (1949-), Israeli Lawyer
