= Agabekov =

Agabekov or Aghabekov is a surname. Notable people with the surname include:

- Georges Agabekov (1896–1937), Armenian Soviet spy and defector
- Sadykh bey Aghabekov (1865–1944), Azerbaijani general and politician
