= Yegor Bulychov and Others =

- Directed by: Yuliya Solntseva; Boris Zakhava
- Written by: Maxim Gorky (play)
- Cinematography: Antonina Egina; Igor Panov
- Production company: Mosfilm
- Release date: 1953
- Running time: 150 minutes
- Country: Soviet Union
- Language: Russian

Yegor Bulychov and Others (Russian: Егор Булычов и другие, romanized: Yegor Bulychyov i drugiye) is a 1953 Soviet drama film directed by Yuliya Solntseva and Boris Zakhava. It was based on a play by Maxim Gorky which was again made into a film in 1971, titled Yegor Bulychyov and Others.

== Cast ==
- Dina Andreeva as Ksenia
- Sergei Lukyanov as Egor Bulychov
- Nina Nikitina as Glafira
- Larisa Pashkova as Varvara
- Nina Rusinova as Melanya

== Bibliography ==
- Michael Brashinsky & Andrew Horton. Russian Critics on the Cinema of Glasnost. Cambridge University Press, 1994.
