= Sadykh bey Aghabeyov =

Army general, linguist, orientalist and politician

Sadykh bey Aghabekov
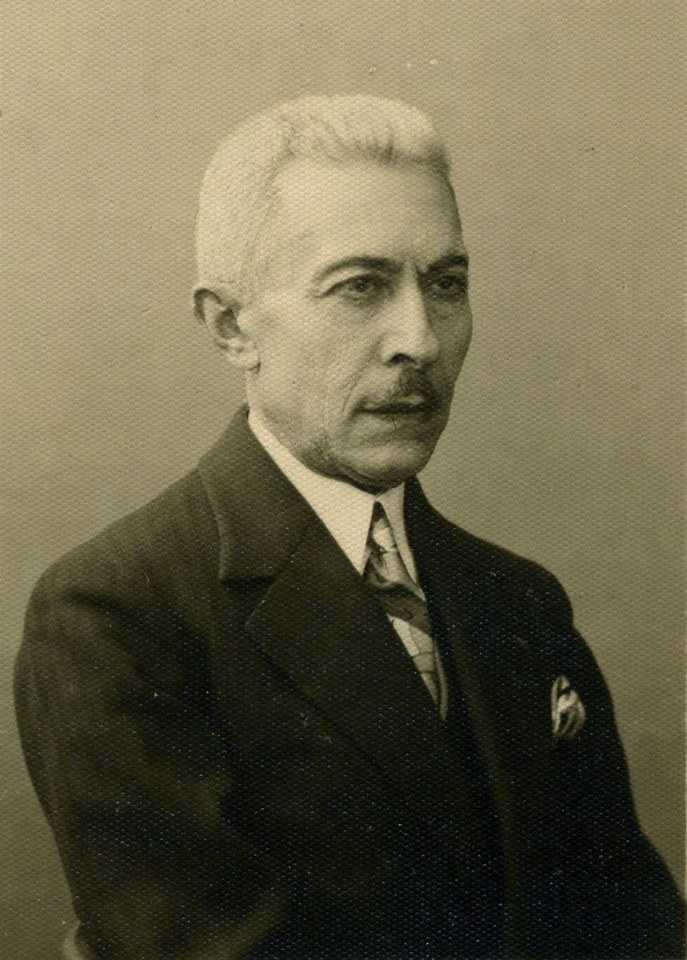
- Born: March 15, 1865; Goychay, Russian Empire
- Died: October 9, 1944 (aged 79); Lviv
- Military career
- Allegiance: Imperial Russian Army, Azerbaijan Democratic Republic
- Branch: Minister of Internal Affairs (Azerbaijan)
- Rank: Major general
- Conflicts: World War I
- Other work: Scientist in Lviv University

Sadykh bey Aghabekov (Azerbaijani: Sadıx bəy Ağabəyov; March 15, 1865 – October 9, 1944) also spelled as Sadykh bey Aghabeyov was an Azerbaijani general in the Russian Imperial Army and Azerbaijani politician in Azerbaijan Democratic Republic, founder and reformer of Azerbaijani Police, Deputy Minister of Internal Affairs of Azerbaijan Democratic Republic, Major General, Orientalist.

== Early life ==
Sadykh bey Aghabekov was born on March 15, 1865, in Goychay city of the Baku Governorate. In 1883, he graduated from the Baku Realny School, after which he enrolled to the 2nd Konstantinovskoe Military School in St. Petersburg.

== Military career ==
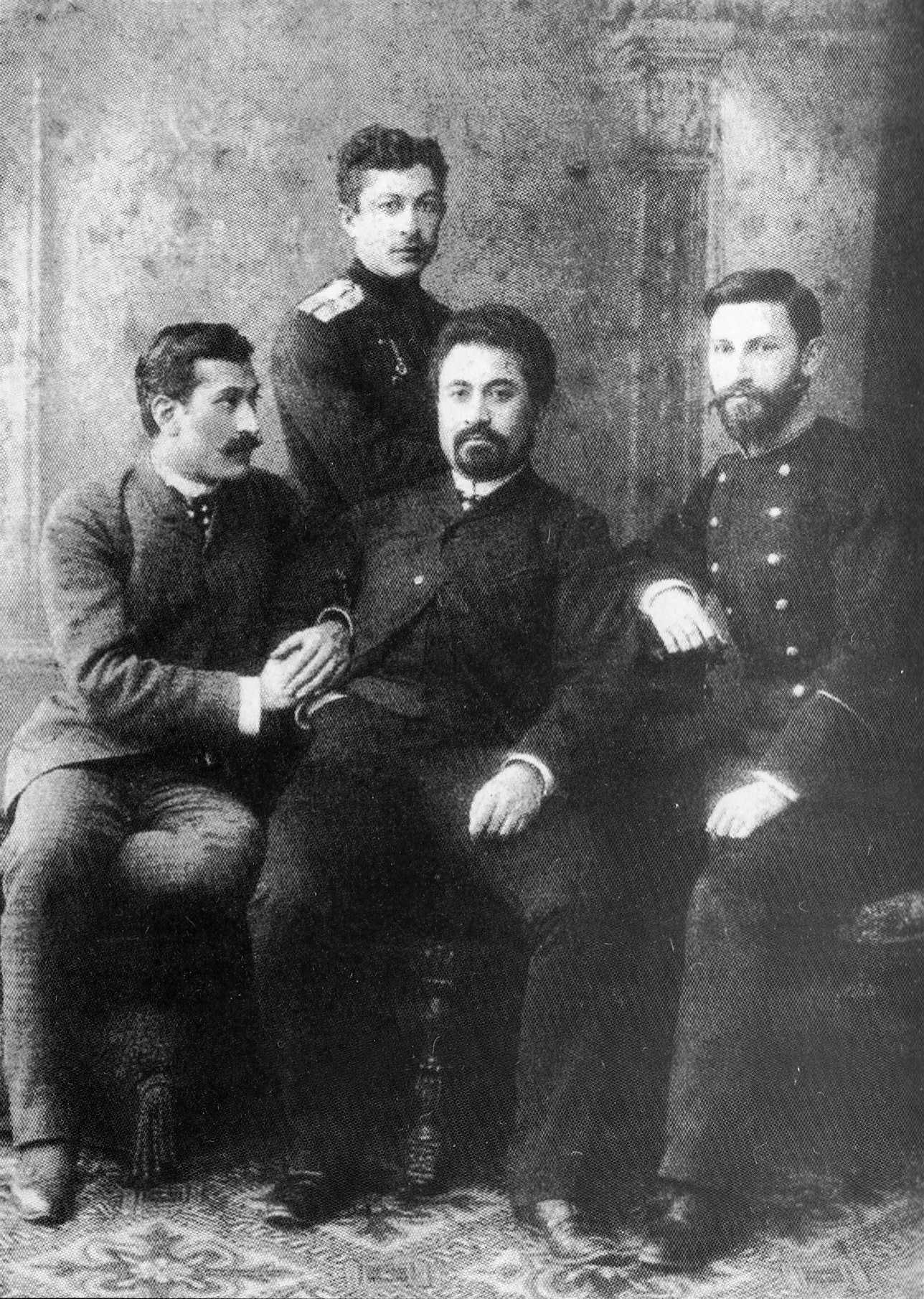
Ali bey Huseynzade, Mahammadtaghi Aliyev (in the center), Sadik Bey Aghabeyov standing.

In 1886, Aghabekov began service in Caucasus with the rank of podporuchik. Ten years later, in 1896, successfully passing the exams, he was admitted to the St. Petersburg Institute of Oriental Languages at the General Staff. After graduating from this institute, in 1899 he was sent to Turkestan for further military service. In 1913, Sadykh bey retired from army in the rank of major general due to illness. At the time of his military service in Turkestan, as a scientist-orientalist, he was collecting folk tales, epics and legends. As a result of titanic work, Sadykh bey published textbook "Turkmen dialect" for which the Emir of Bukhara awarded him a special diploma.

After retiring from the active military duty, Sadykh bey was confident that his military career ended and he would spend the rest of his life in his native Goychay. But after beginning of World War I, he returned to the army and fought in battles in Caucasus and then on the Ukrainian front. In 1916, Aghabekov bey returned to his homeland and lived in his house in Goychay.

By the decision of the Government of Azerbaijan Democratic Republic on October 23, 1918, Sadykh bey was appointed Deputy Minister of Internal Affairs of Azerbaijan. In early October 1919, on behalf of the government, Sadiq Bey met with General James Harbort, the Personal Representative of the President of the United States, in Batumi. Sadig Bey accompanied the presidential envoy from October 4–10 and provided him with a bodyguard. Upon arrival in Baku, General Harbort visited the house of Haji Zeynalabdin Tagiyev. He noted in his speech that Sadig Bey is a man of high intellectual potential, and he has never met such a highly educated and interesting man among the military. His term lasted until December 1919. Sadykh bey was a reformer of law enforcement system in Azerbaijan.

== Later years ==
After occupation of Azerbaijan, Sadykh bey emigrated to Turkey with his family. He then moved to Paris, where he taught Turkish and Persian at the Sorbonne for 2 years. In Paris, he had another strike of fate - death of his wife Gulnara.

After death of his wife, at the invitation of Zygmunt Smogorzewski he moved to Lviv where he started to work in Faculty of Philosophy in Lviv University and later in Lviv High Trade School, where he taught Turkish, Persian, and Arabic. In 1931 Sadykh bey published his Turkish textbook in Polish. In 1932, he published textbook about elementary grammar of Arabic, which had been written on the base of the second edition of the New Arabic Grammar by Auguste Périer. During the Nazi occupation, he was evicted from his apartment. In 1943, he felt ill and on October 9, 1944, he died.

Aghabekov was buried in Lviv in Lychakiv Cemetery. One of Lviv streets was named in honor of Sadykh bey Agabekov. There is a tombstone on his grave in the Lviv cemetery.

== See also ==
- Ibrahim bey Usubov
