= Ottilia Reizman =

- 1945 at the liberation of Budapest
- Born: Ottilia Boleslavovna Reizman; 24 September 1914; Minsk, Russian Empire
- Died: 22 April 1986 (aged 71); Moscow, USSR
- Other names: Ottilia Reisman
- Occupation: camera operator
- Years active: 1927-1973
- Known for: World War II documentary newsreels

Ottilia Reizman (Russian: Оттилия Болеславовна Рейзман 11 September 1914 O.S. /24 September 1914 (N.S.)-22 April 1986) was a camerawoman and filmmaker. During World War II, she was one of only two women camera operators allowed on the front lines. Her work was recognized by the Stalin Prize twice, in 1949 and 1951.

== Early life ==
Ottilia Boleslavovna Reizman, known as "Otya" was born on 24 September 1914 in Minsk, in the Russian Empire, now Belarus. In 1927, Reizman began working for Belarusfilm. She attended VGIK's camera school at a time when very few women were allowed to enter the field. As it was the only school which trained camera operators, competition for entrance was difficult and there were only a handful of women besides Reizman, including Antonina Egina, Galina Monglovskaya, Margarita Pilikhina and Era Savelyeva, who had been admitted.

== Career ==
Graduating from VGIK in 1935, Reizman began working at the Moscow Newsreel Studio. She also worked at the Soyuzkinochronika, both were precursors to the current Central Studio for Documentary Film (CSDF), as an assistant camera operator. Reizman took part in the filming of the Great Women's Automobile Race of 1936 and filming of the miners in Kuzbass. The CSDF employed ninety-eight cameramen and only two women, Reizman and Masha Sukhova (ru). In 1938, she was arrested and charged with counter-revolutionary activities (ru) under Article 58 of the Penal Code, but after examination of the evidence, the charges were dismissed.

When World War II began, both Reizman and Sukhova asked to be sent to film the action, but were relegated to film behind the German lines accompanying the partisan units under the command of "Batya", a pseudonym for Grigory Linkov (ru). During a German offensive against the partisans Sukhova was killed, when the camera operators were surrounded and had to break through the lines to run for cover. Upon her return to Moscow, Reizman was decorated with two military honors, Medal "Partisan of the Patriotic War" and Order of the Patriotic War, both in the second degree. After Belarus was liberated, she was sent to Hungary to film military action there. Some of Reizman's 1944 footage from Budapest was used in the Nuremberg Trials. She worked with the group filming the 2nd Ukrainian Front, the Far Eastern Front and the arrival of the Russians in Czechoslovakia after the German capitulation.

In 1947, Reizman was part of the crew which filmed a full-length documentary, Moscow is the Capital of the USSR (Russian: Москва-столица СССР), which gave the history of the city during the Russian Revolution, the Great Patriotic War and reconstruction in the post-war period. The following year, she participated in the creation of another full-length film, Guardian of the World (Russian: На страже мира). She received the Stalin Prize in the second degree for these two works. In 1949, Reizman filmed Glory of Labor (Russian: Слава труду), receiving a second Stalin Prize; this one in the third degree.

Between 1965 and 1973, Reizman was the director of the CDFS newsreel series Pioneering (Russian: Пионерия). The most noted films of this series were the tenth and eleventh films which featured the Orlyonok's All-Union Children's Arts Festival of 1967. After his breakup with Klavdiya Shulzhenko, Georgi Epifanov and Reizman married, but he returned to Shulzhenko in 1976.

== Death and legacy ==
Reizman died on 22 April 1986 in Moscow, USSR. In 2014, ARTE France and Melisande Films produced the film Shoah, the Forgotten History (French: Shoah, les oubliés de l'histoire) under the direction of Veronique Lagoarde-Segot, using images created by Roman Karmen, Reizman and Mark Trojanovsky on the front lines of World War II.
