= 1906 Russian legislative election =

- March 1906

All 477 seats in the State Duma 239 seats needed for a majority
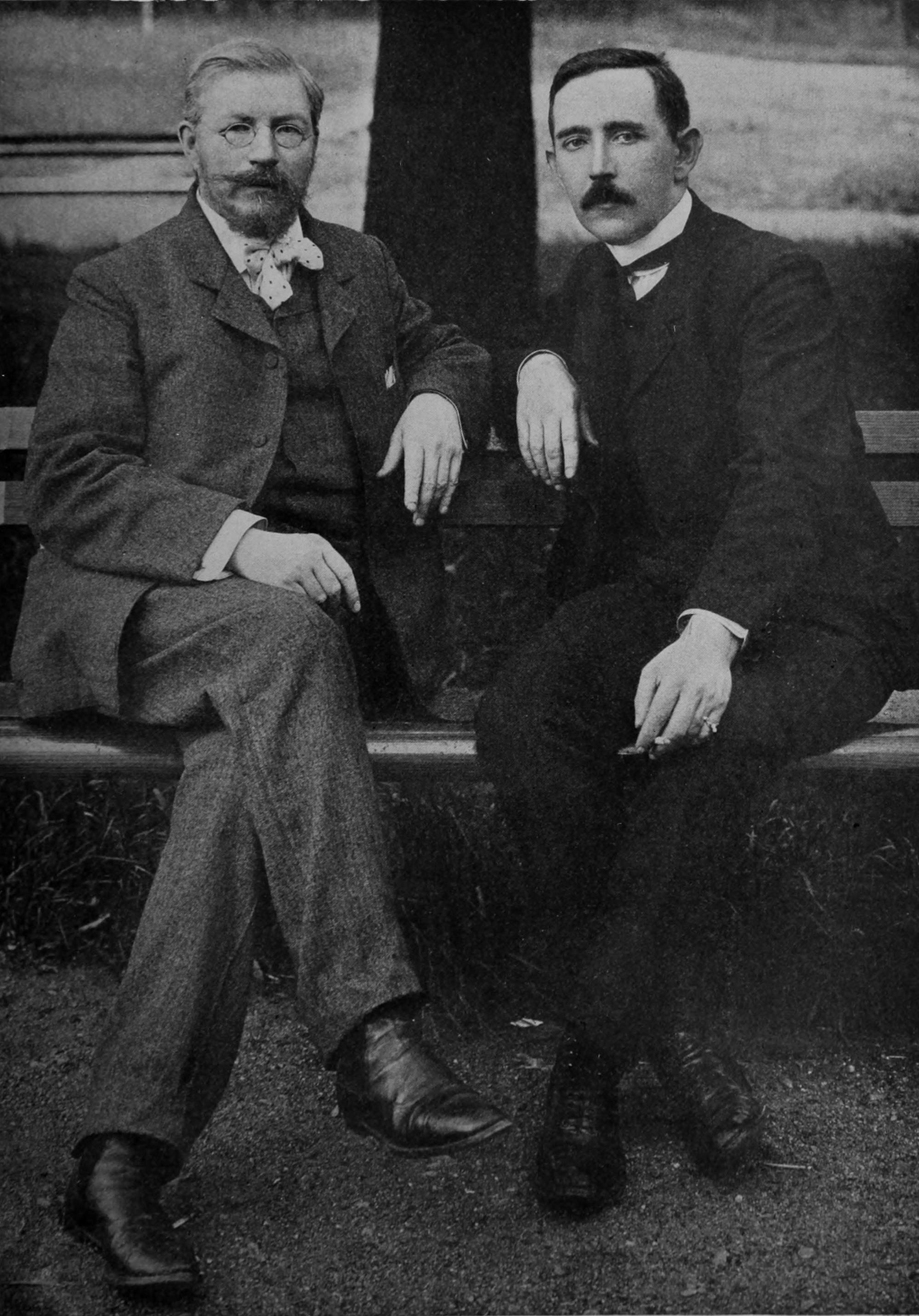

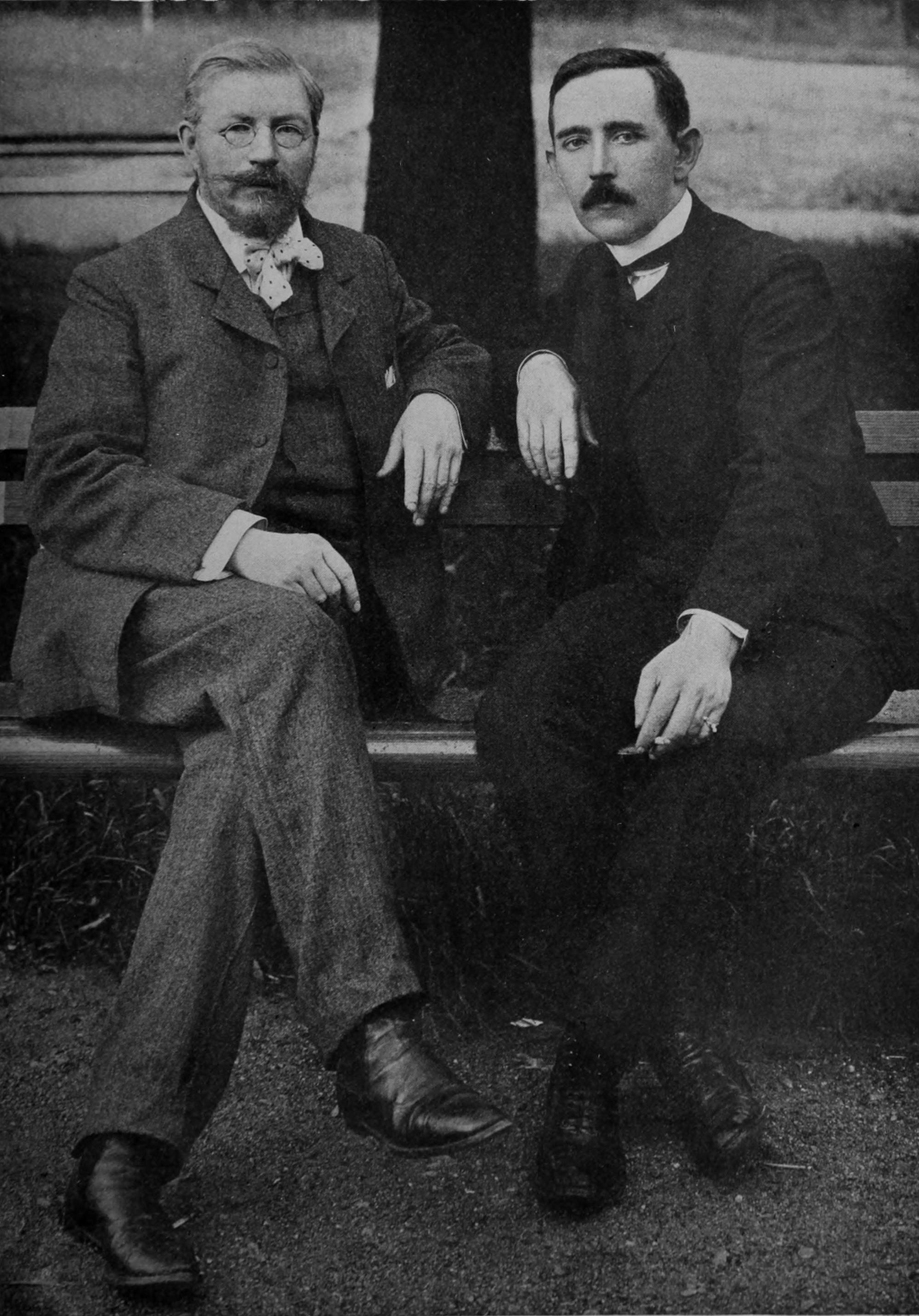

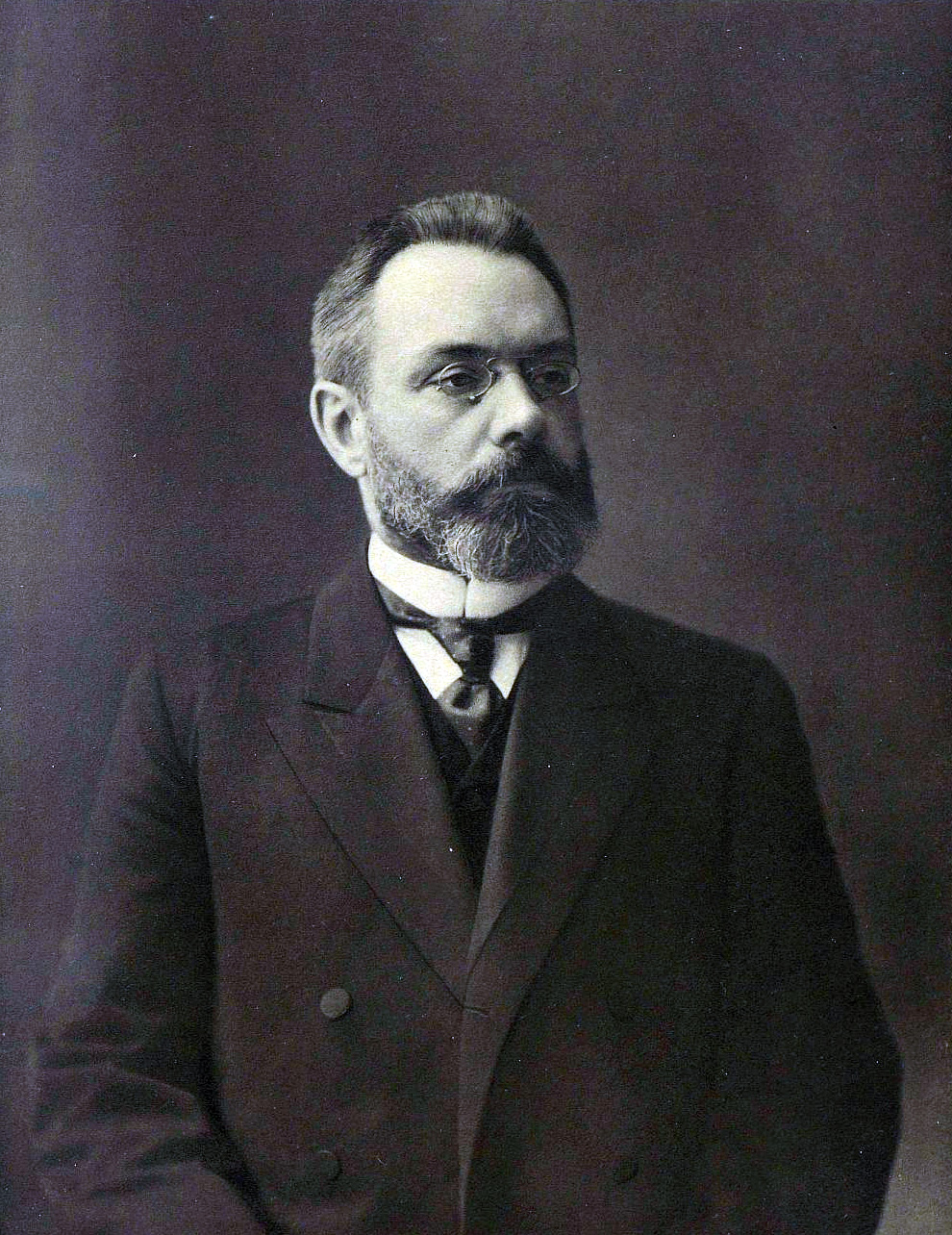
	Majority party	Minority party	Third party
Leader	Pavel Milyukov	Alexey Aladyin	Alexander Guchkov
Party	Kadets	Trudoviks	Octobrist
Seats won	184	85	38
Chairman-designate
Sergey Muromtsev
Constitutional Democratic Party

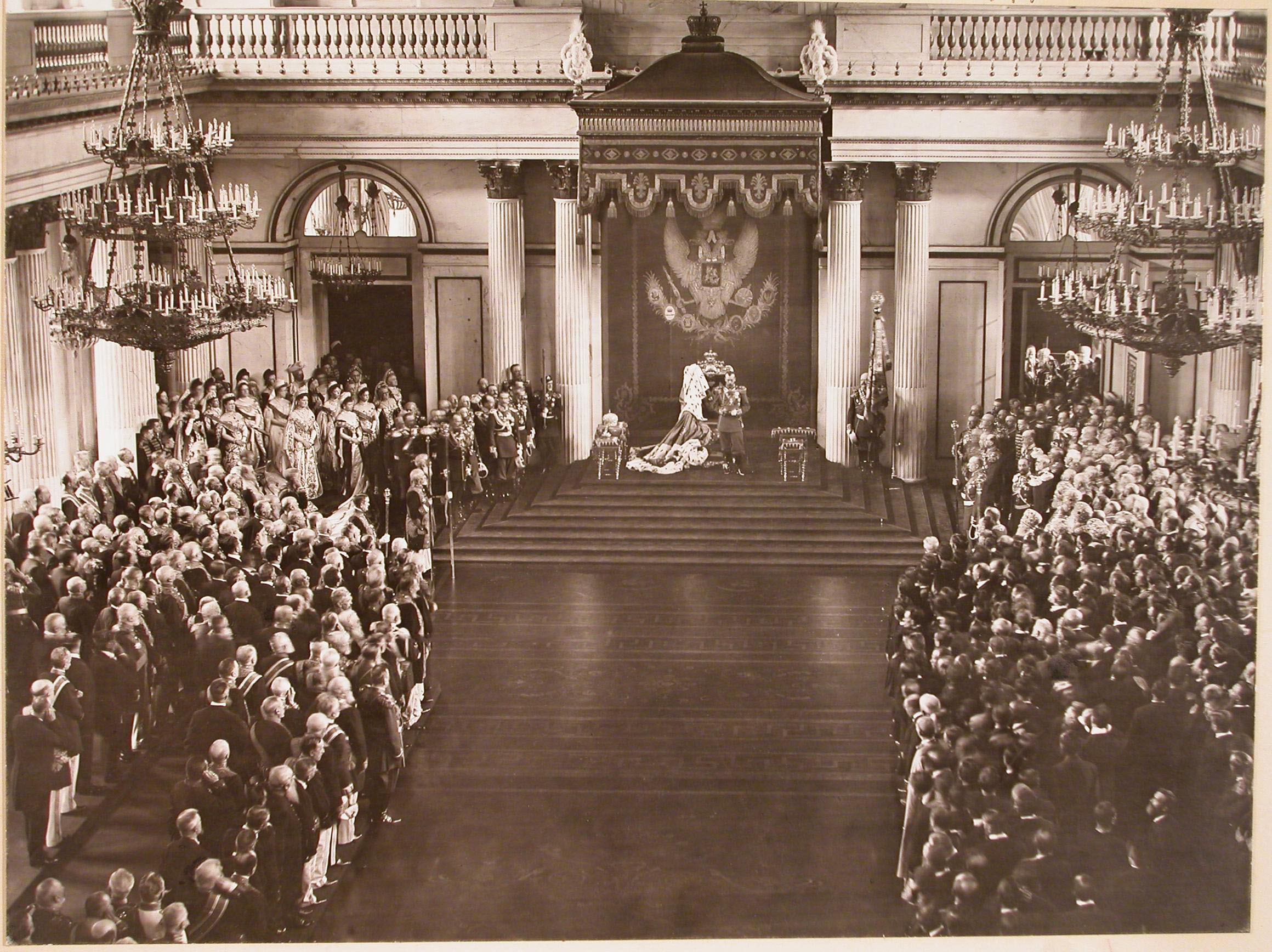
Tsar Nicholas II's opening speech before the two chambers on 10 May 1906 (27 April 1906 in the O.S.), at the Winter Palace.

Sergey Muromtsev (1850–1910) was the President of the First State Duma

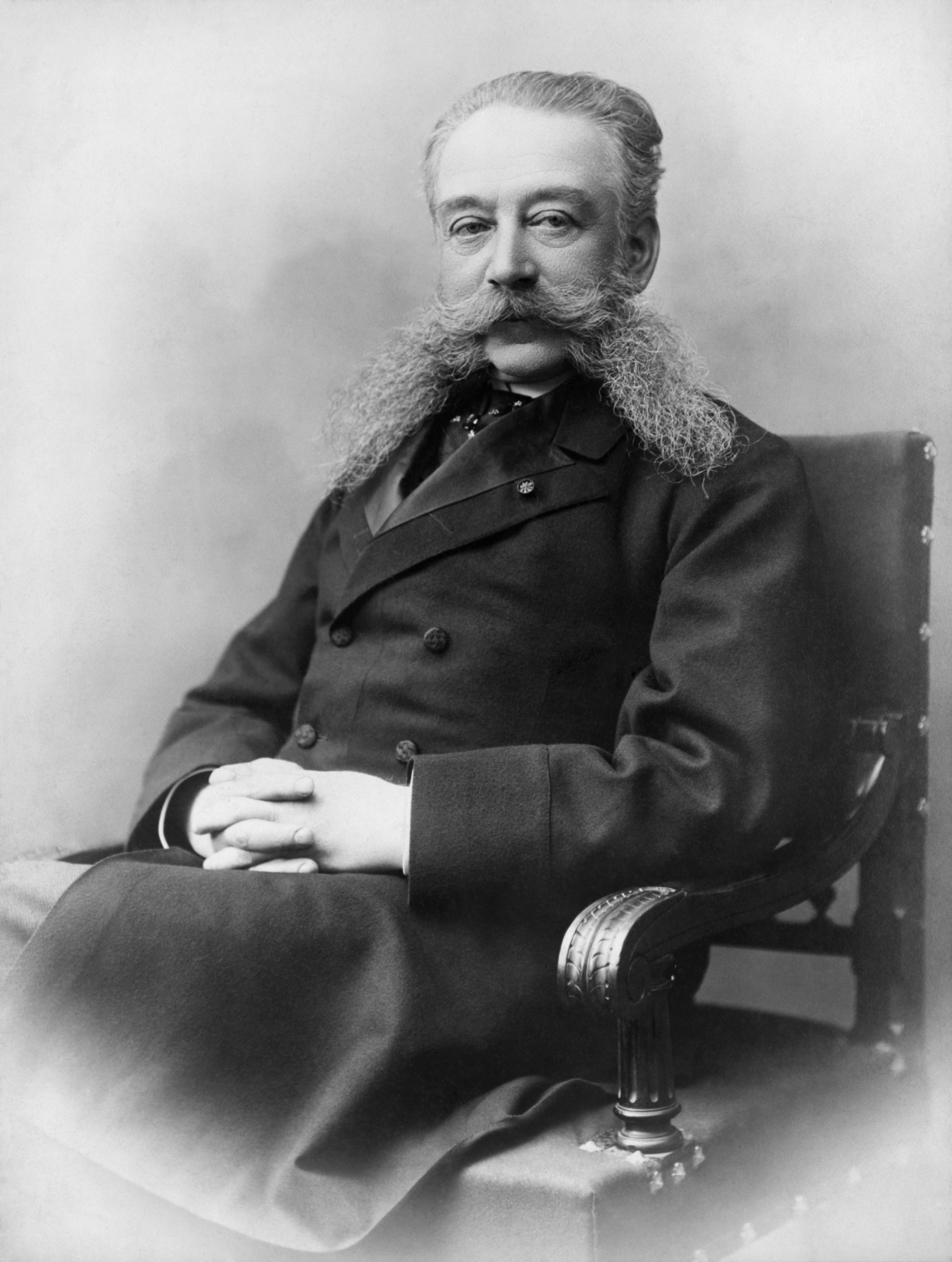
Prime Minister Ivan Goremykin (1839–1917) was instrumental in the dissolution of the First State Duma

Legislative elections were held in the Russian Empire from 26 March to 20 April 1906. At stake were the 477 seats in the State Duma of the Russian Empire, the legislative assembly. Election for the First State Duma, which only ran from 27 April to 8 July (O.S.) 1906, returned a significant bloc of moderate socialists and two liberal parties which demanded further reforms. For this reason, it is sometimes called the Duma of Public Anger (Дума народного гнева).

== Background ==
The State Duma was created after a wave of violent attacks against imperial officials and public upheaval, which culminated in a national strike in October 1905 known as Russian Revolution of 1905, paving the way for Russia's first parliament. With the nation's infrastructure all but paralyzed, Tsar Nicholas II signed a historic manifesto of 17 October 1905, promising civil rights to the population and creating Russia's first parliament.

=== Electoral legislation ===
The electoral laws were promulgated in December 1905 and introduced franchise to male citizens over 25 years of age, and electing through four electoral colleges. The elections were therefore not universal as they excluded women, soldiers, and officers. Nor were they equal since the constituencies differed greatly in size.

The general elections to the State Duma took place in March 1906 and were boycotted by the some socialist groups and the Bolsheviks. Among the political parties formed were the peasant leaders' Labour Group (Trudoviks), liberal-intelligentsia Constitutional Democratic party (the Kadets), the less liberal Union of October 17 (the Octobrists), and the positively reactionary Union of Land-Owners.

== Results ==
As official records are vague about the party composition of the Duma, these figures must be understood as educated guesswork. Among the Leftists, it was alleged by the Kadets that 2 members belonged to the Social-Democrats and 17 were Socialist Revolutionaries.

Out of the 36 Duma members from the Congress Kingdom, 34 were Poles who subsequently joined the Polish Club (Koło Polskie). Another 19 Polish Duma members were elected in Belarus and Ukraine. There were twelve Jewish deputies in the First Duma, which decreased to three in the Second Duma (February 1907 to June 1907), two in the Third Duma (1907–1912), and then increased to three again in the Fourth Duma, elected in 1912. At the 1906 elections, the Jewish Labour Bund had made an electoral agreement with the Lithuanian Labourers' Party (Trudoviks), which resulted in the election to the Duma of two (non-Bundist) candidates in the Lithuanian provinces: Dr. Shmaryahu Levin for the Vilnius province and Leon Bramson for the Kaunas province.

Among the other Jewish deputies were Maxim Vinaver, chairman of the League for the Attainment of Equal Rights for the Jewish People in Russia (Folksgrupe) and cofounder of the Constitutional Democratic Party (Kadets), Dr. Nissan Katzenelson (Courland province, Zionist, Kadet), Dr. Moisei Yakovlevich Ostrogorsky (Grodno province, Kadet), attorney Simon Yakovlevich Rosenbaum (Minsk province, Zionist, Kadet), Mikhail Isaakovich Sheftel (Ekaterinoslav province, Kadet), Dr. Bruk, Dr. Victor Jacobson. Three of the Jewish deputies joined the Labour faction, the nine other joined the Kadet fraction. According to Rufus Learsi, five of them were Zionists, including Dr. Shmaryahu Levin, Dr. Victor Jacobson and Simon Yakovlevich Rosenbaum. Two out of twelve, Grigori Borisovich Iollos (Poltava province) and Mikhail Herzenstein, both from the Constitutional Democratic Party, were assassinated by the Black Hundreds antisemite terrorist group.

Party	Seats
Constitutional Democratic Party (Note: Includes Party of Democratic Reform)	184
Trudoviks (Note: Includes Popular Socialists)	85
Union of October 17	38
National minorities	32
Russian Social Democratic Labour Party	17
Rightists	7
Socialist Revolutionary Party	2
Independents	112
Total	477
Source: Levin

=== Members of the First Duma ===
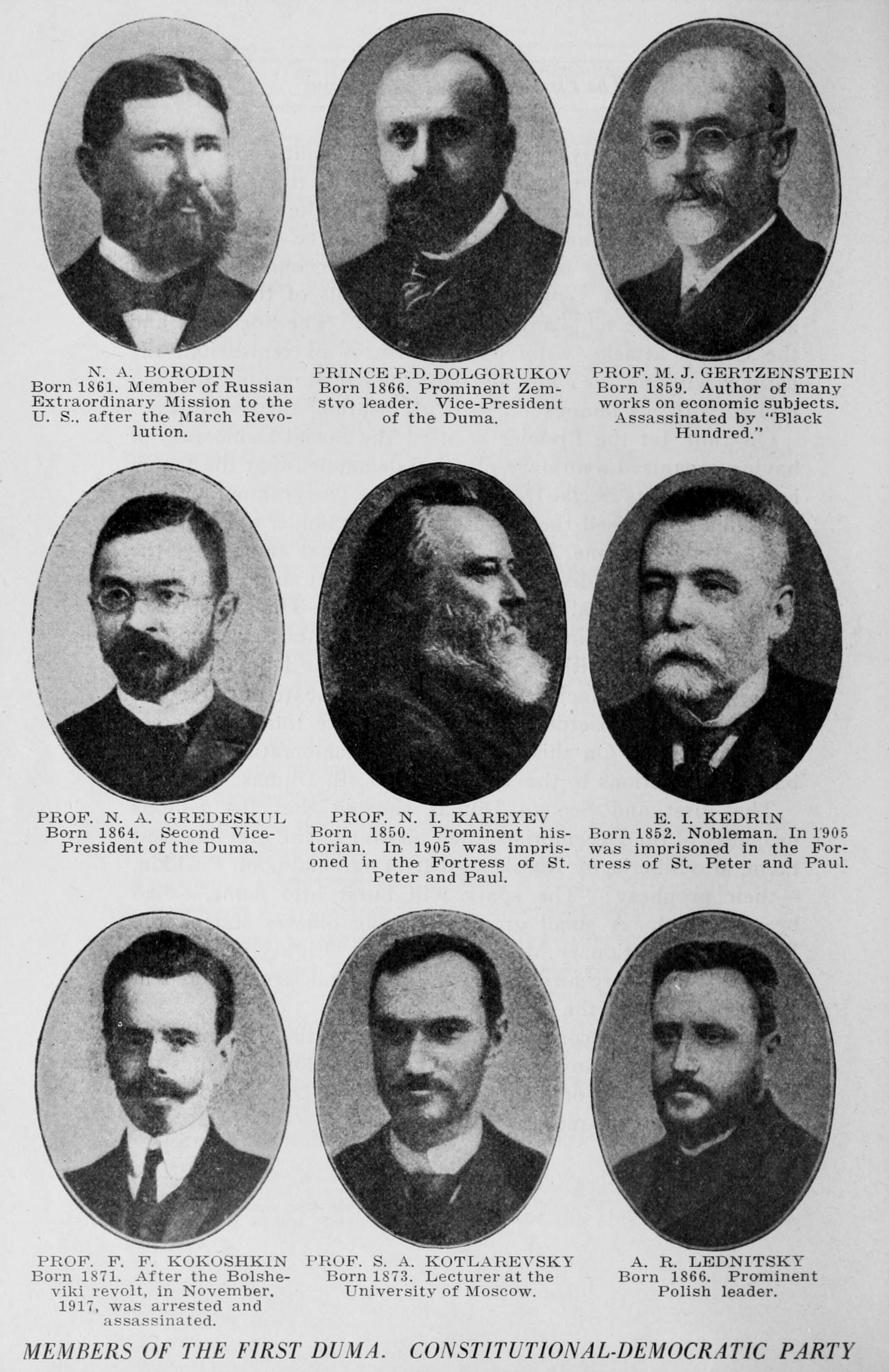
Constitutional Democrats.

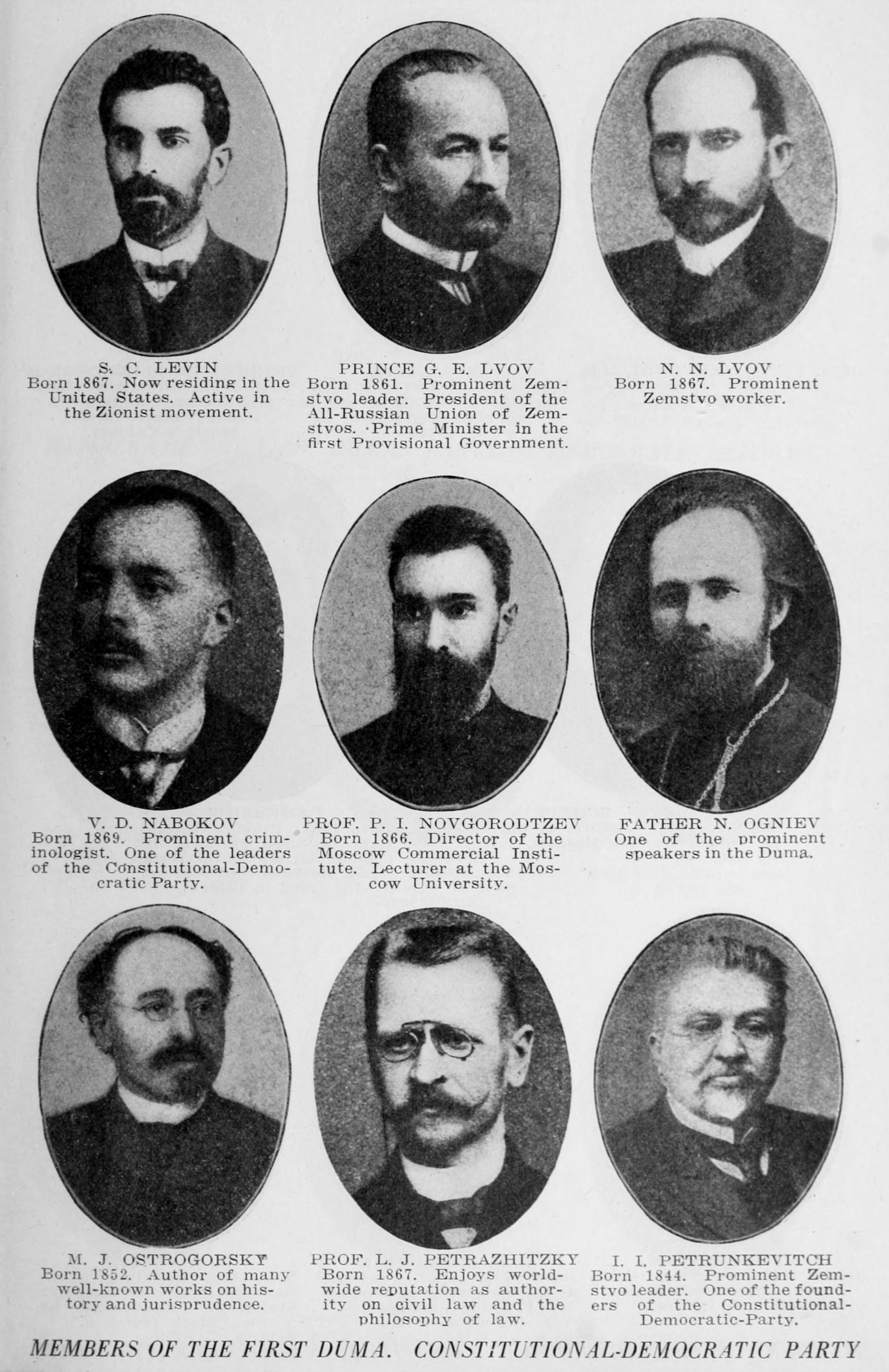
Constitutional Democrats.

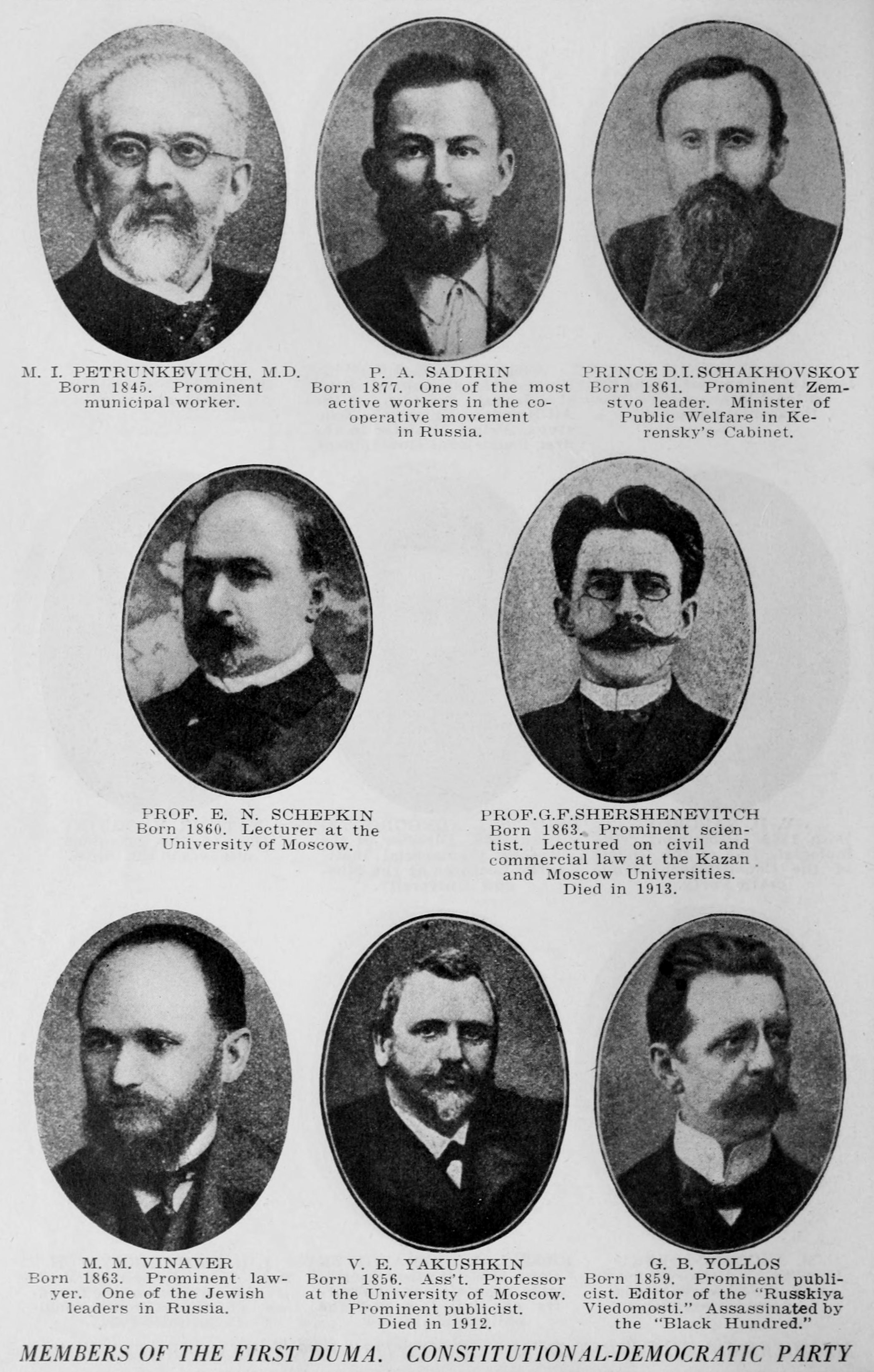
Constitutional Democrats.

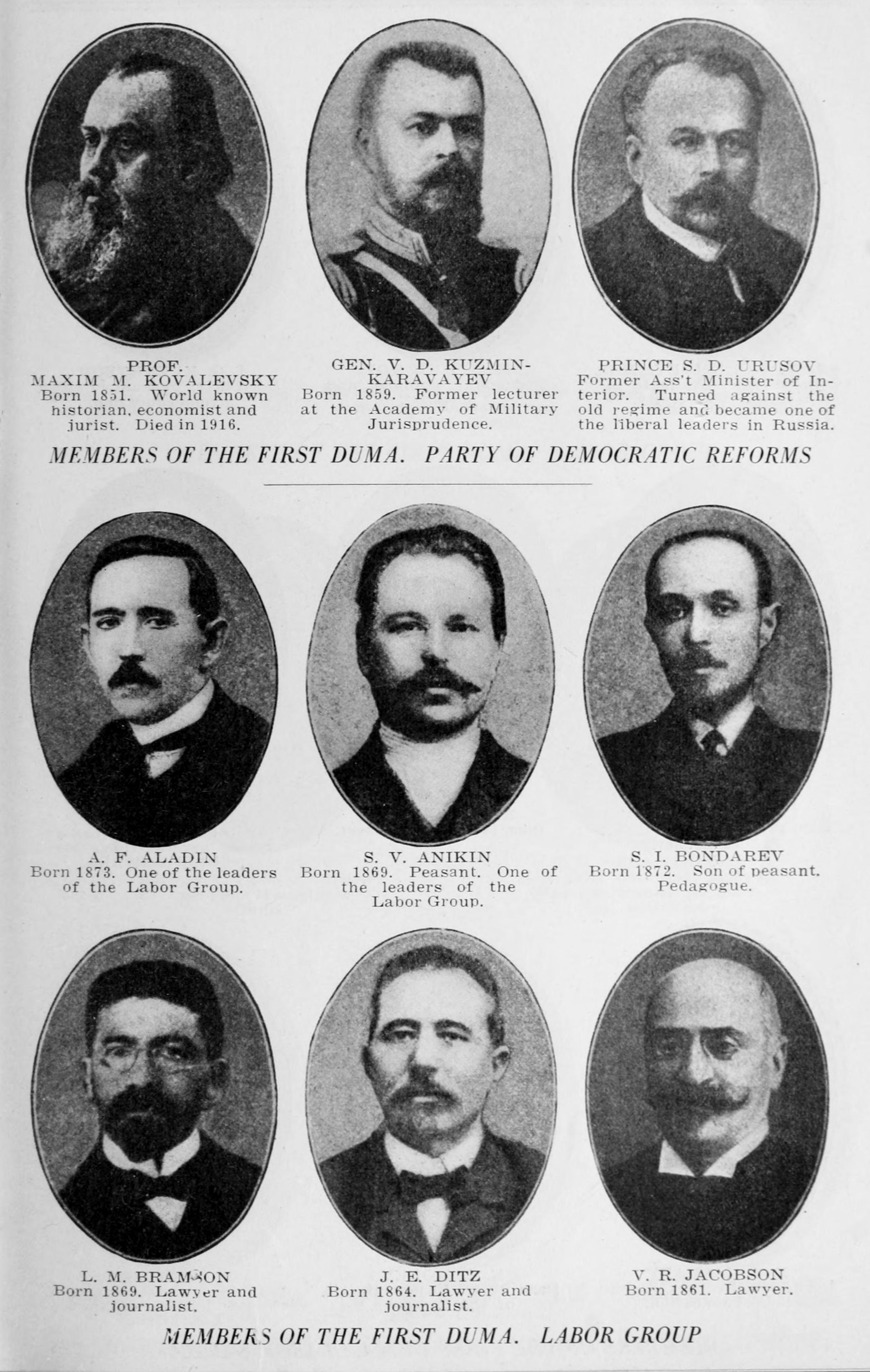
Democratic Reform Party/Labour Group.

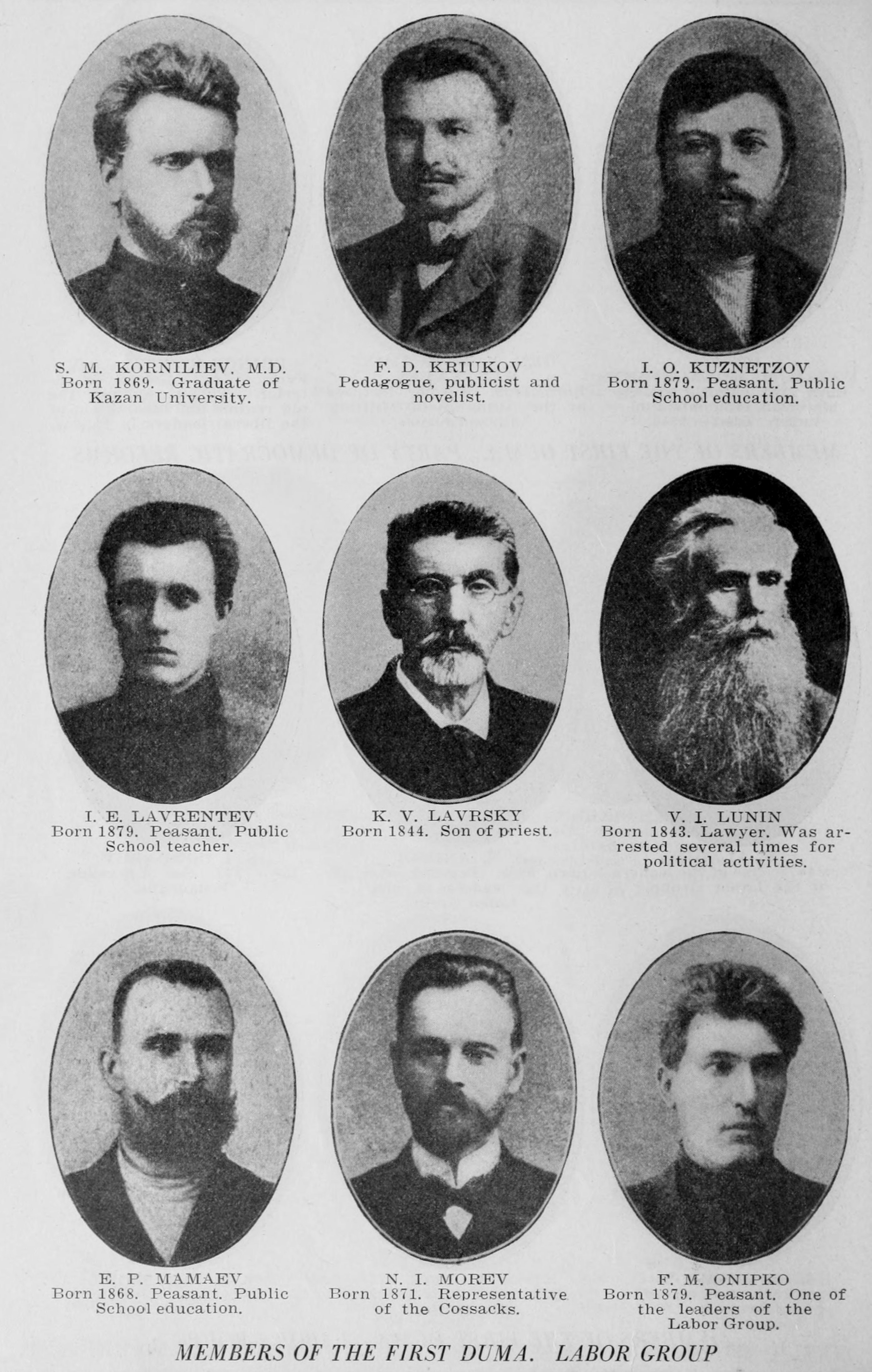
Labour Group.

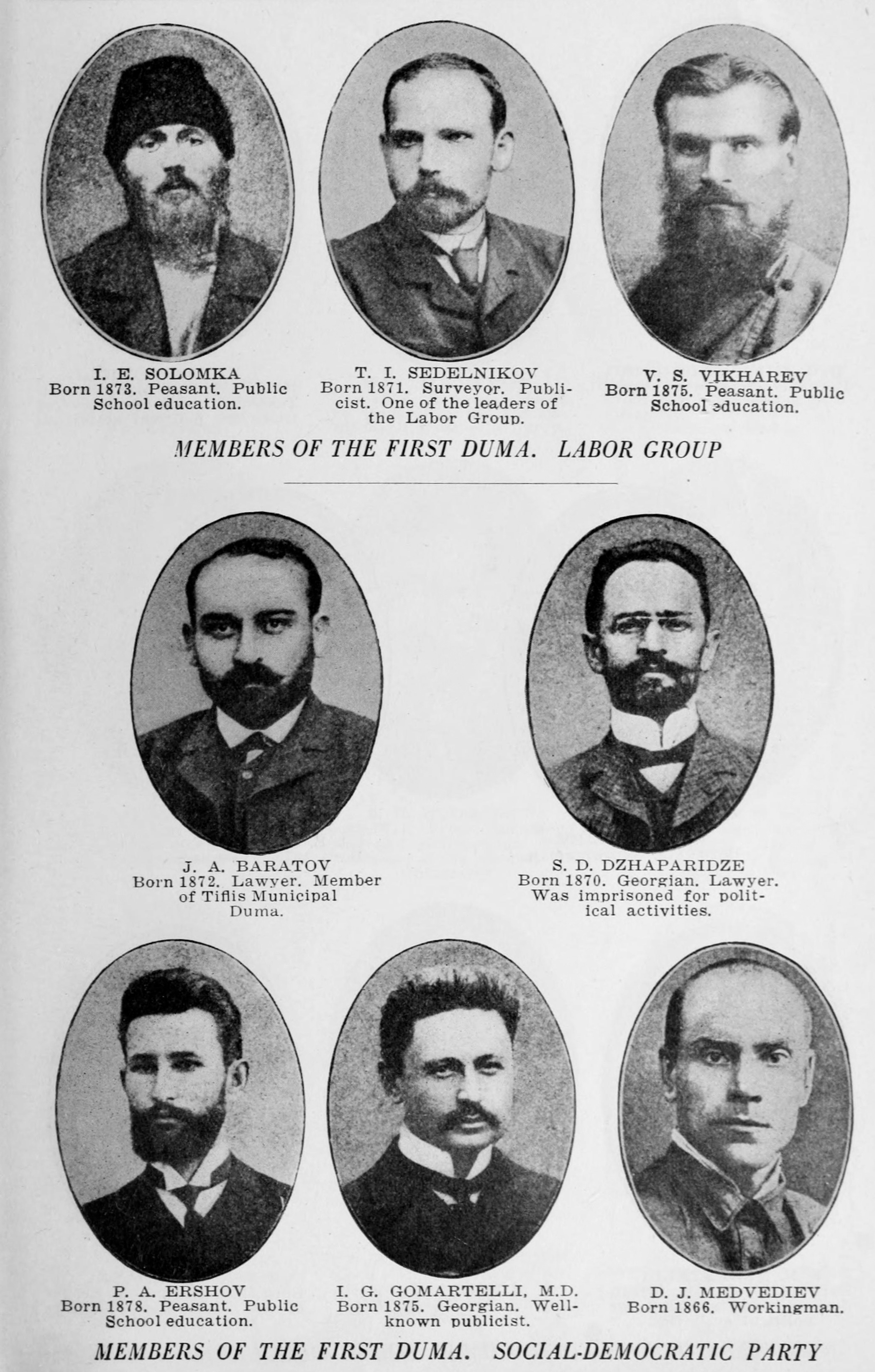
Labour Group/Social Democrats.

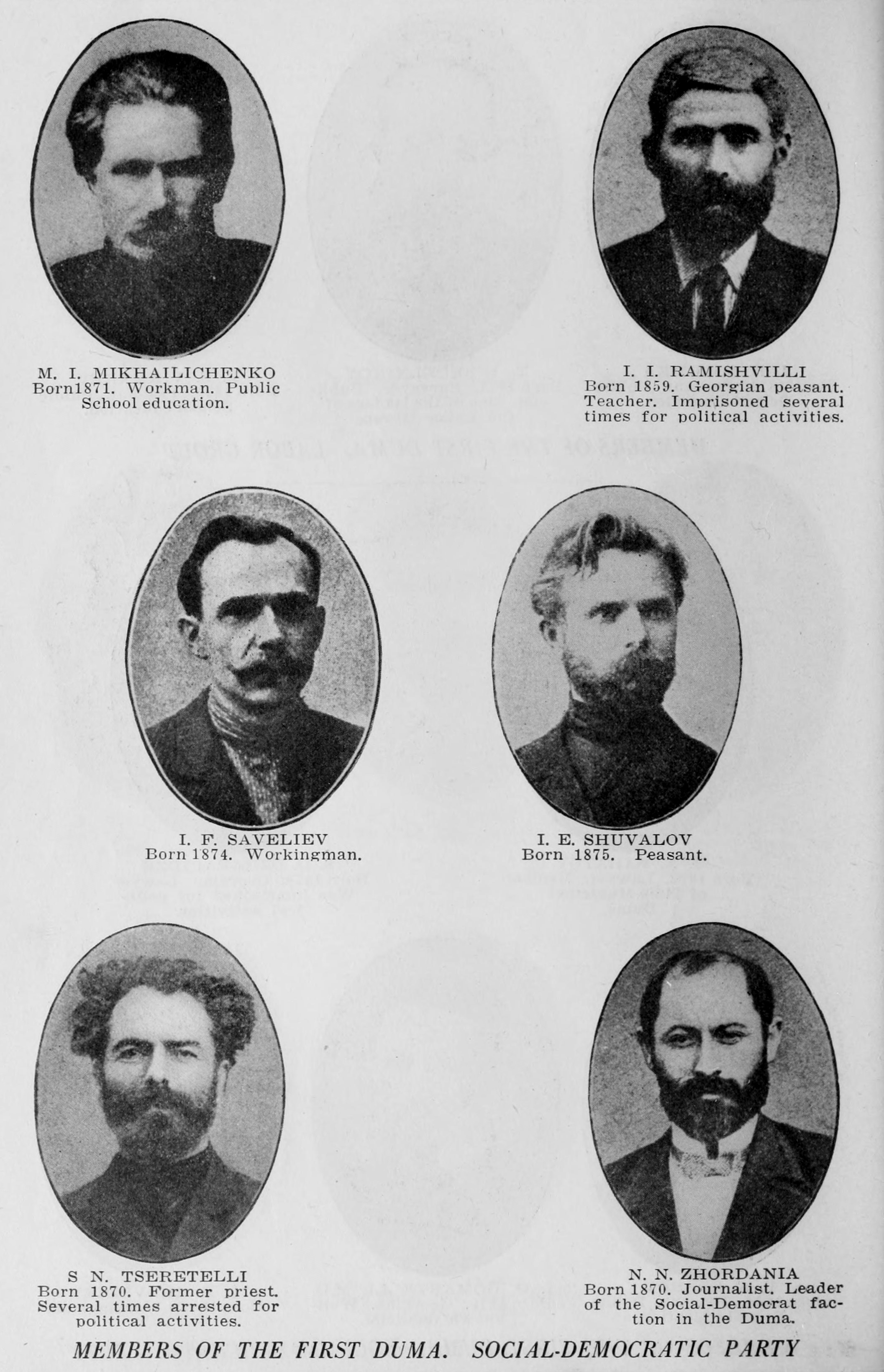
Social Democrats.

== Aftermath ==
=== Basic Law ===
In April 1906, only weeks after the election, the Sergei Witte's Cabinet issued the Basic Law of 1906, setting the limits of this new political order. The Tsar was confirmed as absolute leader, with complete control of the executive, foreign policy, church, and the armed forces. The State Duma was shifted, becoming a lower chamber below the reformed State Council of Imperial Russia, which had been the Russian legislative body since 1810. Legislation had to be approved by the Duma, the Council and the Emperor to become law - and in "exceptional conditions" the government could bypass the Duma. The Basic Law introduced a special provision, Article 87, which allowed the government to ex officio issue new legislation during breaks between sessions of the State Duma. Later on, Tsar Nicholas II would frequently use this provision in order to carry out the laws that had not been supported by the State Duma.

=== Session ===
Russian members of the First State Duma

The State Duma (and the State Council - the upper house) convened for the first time on 27 April 1906. On 10 May Sergey Muromtsev, a Law Professor at the Saint Petersburg University, was elected President of the Duma. Professor Muromtsev, a leading figure of the liberal Kadet party, tried to maintain some degree of order and dignity in this difficult assembly. He was much praised for the way he chaired the debates, always keeping to the strictest legality, but always pursuing a constitutional and anti-autocratic agenda.

The anti-autocracy was evident from the first days of the First Duma. In response to the Tsar's opening speech on 5 May, the assembly called for amnesty for political prisoners, real political freedom and equality. Eight days later, the chairman of the Council of Ministers, Prime Minister Ivan Goremykin, rejected all these claims. The State Duma in turn adopted a resolution of non confidence of the government and demanded Prime Minister Goremykin's resignation. During the 72-day session of the First Duma, a total of 391 requests about illegal actions of the government were filed. Only two laws were passed: a ban on capital punishment and measures to help provinces that had been hit by a famine.

=== Dissolution ===
Due to the growing tensions between the State Duma and Tsar Nicholas II's Council of Ministers, prominently Prime Minister Goremykin, the assembly was dismissed by Imperial ukase after only 10 weeks, on 8 July 1906. The Tsar said that instead of drawing up laws, the deputies were investigating the authorities and thereby intruding on his authority. In a sign of frustration, members of the liberal Cadets party wanted the elected Duma to continue its work and proposed that it should retreat to Vyborg in Finland. Despite the hopes of the Kadets and the fears of the government, there was no widespread popular reaction. However, an assassination attempt on Pyotr Stolypin led to the establishment of field trials for terrorists. For signing this Vyborg Appeal, the Cadets (including Duma President Muromtsev) were arrested and imprisoned for some months - and consequently excluded from future Duma elections. This paved the way for an alternative makeup for the Second Duma of 1907.

== See also ==
- State Duma of the Russian Empire
- State Council of Imperial Russia
- Russian Council of Ministers
- Russian Constitution of 1906
- Sergey Witte
