= Antonina Egina =

Russian cinematographer

- Born: 16 June 1910
- Died: 2 May 1978 (aged 67)
- Occupation: Cinematographer

Antonina Egina was a cinematographer who worked in the Soviet Union at Mosfilm during the 1950s and 1960s. She was one of the few women working in this role.

== Selected filmography ==
- Serdtse Rossii (1970)
- Papina zhena (1968)
- My, russkiy narod (1966)
- Polovodye (1963)
- Duel (1961)
- Pervoye svidaniye (1960)
- Soldatskoye serdtse (1959)
- Gost s Kubani (1956)
- Saltanat (1955)
- Yegor Bulychyov i drugiye (1953)
