= Anna Gelman =

Soviet chemist

Anna Dmitrievna Gelman (also Dmitriyevna/Dmitryevna) (Russian: Гельман Анна Дмитриевна) (18 February 1902 — 29 March 1991) (née Nikitin) was a Soviet and Russian chemist and engineer. She was the first to synthesise alkene complexes of platinum, discovered heptavalent states of plutonium and other actinides and created and improved processes for radionuclide production.

== Life and career ==
She was born in Biysk, Altai Krai, Siberia. Her mother was a seamstress and her father a woodman. Her father died when she was seven, so she helped her mother with her three younger siblings. Aged eight, she went to school and graduated with a merit certificate. She attended Biysk Women's High School and because of her study efforts was released from school fees. She graduated in 1921 but had not received appropriate education to enrol at Tomsk University, 450 km to the north. She underwent two years of self-study while teaching in a Tomsk orphanage, before being accepted on a one-year course in Leningrad, 3400 km from her home town. While there, she married August Ansovich Gelman, a border guard. Thereafter, she lived in different border posts of Siberia and central Asia while teaching.

In 1928, she was transferred to the Crimea for health reasons. In 1930, she enrolled at the Crimean Pedagogical Institute. She studied in the department of chemistry and worked in a bromine plant in the town of Saki. In the spring of 1932, her husband died. That autumn, she graduated and was recommended for postgraduate studies at the Leningrad Pedagogical Institute. She passed the entrance exams but also took the exams for graduate studies. The course leader, I.I. Chernyaev, told her she had the knowledge but that, aged 30, she was too old to study science. She made it clear she was offended, and Chernyaev took her under his supervision. From 1932 to 1936, she was a graduate student and a senior research associate at the Institute of National Economy and Leningrad State University. In 1934, she published her first work, under her maiden name, Nikitin, as an engineer: the VIAM (All-union Institute for Aviation Materials (Russian:Всесоюзный институт авиационных материалов)) production instruction. She was a part-time assistant professor at the Department of Inorganic Chemistry at the university from 1936 to 1938. Chernyaev invited her to become a doctoral student at the Institute of General and Inorganic Chemistry in Moscow in 1938. She gained a Ph.D. in 1941 and worked as a senior researcher at the Institute until 1949.

Gelman was the first to find ways of synthesising ethylene (and other alkene) complexes of platinum. Her graduate work in 1941 explained the action of ethylene on platinum (III) salts at low pressure. She found new compounds of platinum (II) and (III) using propylene and butene amongst other alkenes. The Academy of Sciences was evacuated to Kazan in World War II; while there she received a telegram from Josef Stalin in 1943 thanking her for her concern about Soviet forces. A monograph of her doctoral dissertation was published in 1945 after the Allied victory and she received the Order of the Badge of Honour, 1st degree for her scientific work and patronage. She continued with work on platinum-alkene complexes, which were later used in homogeneous catalysis.

In the winter of 1945, Chernyaev instructed Gelman to develop processes to isolate uranium and thorium compounds from aqueous solutions. This was followed up with the isolation of plutonium from uranium and nuclear fission by-products in 1947. In the absence of plutonium - which was only just being produced in small quantities in the Soviet Union - Gelman and her colleague L.N. Essen replaced plutonium (IV) with thorium, plutonium (III) with lanthanum and used rare-earth element fragments to imitate fission products. This production scheme, in which oxalates and carbonates of plutonium were removed from the solution, was verified at NII-9 (now the All-Russian Scientific Research Institute of Inorganic Materials (VNIINM)) for implementation at Plutonium Combine No.817, which was just being built; the product for delivery to the metallurgical department was purified plutonium dioxide. Gelman was seconded to the plant until 1951; all radiochemical staff - many of whom were young graduates from technical schools and universities - faced considerable risks to their health while production and safety procedures were being developed. Plant workers suffered and died, e.g. from pneumosclerosis, after the inhalation of aerosols of alpha particle-emitting radionuclides produced in processing after the irradiation of the uranium source material. Gelman, with her colleagues Chernyaev, and V.D. Nikolsky, wrote the first regulations for processing plutonium salts; they won state prizes in 1949 and 1951 for creating and improving plutonium refining technology.

Gelman returned to Moscow in 1952, securing 50 grammes of plutonium dioxide from Combine No.817 for researchers to use at the Institute of General and Inorganic Chemistry. The compound was used in the doctoral theses of students who went on to become leading researchers at the plutonium plant. She became part-time deputy chief of the plant, working in the radiochemical research section. She married Boris Musrukov, director of the plant and major-general of the engineering service. He was soon transferred to the Ministry of Medium Machine Building and, in 1955, he was appointed director of Arzamas-16, (also known as KB-11 [Design Bureau-11] based at the closed city of Sarov, Nizhny Novgorod oblast. Gelman raised his two children and, after separating from him, his daughter Elena remained with Gelman.

V.I. Spitzyn, director of the Institute of Physics and Chemical Sciences of the Academy of Sciences, suggested in 1954 (with the support of Chernyaev and Ministry of Medium Machine Building (the state organ controlling nuclear facilities) that Gelman transfer there because a new 'hot' laboratory was being built. She accepted and directed the laboratory researching transuranium elements, inviting colleagues from Combine No.817 and the Institute of Microorganisms to join her. She remained at the laboratory for the rest of her career. In the primary research undertaken, various actinides were studied with many different types of ligands in simple and complex compounds, with research published internationally. Gelman, with students N.N. Krot and M.P. Mefod'eva discovered heptavalent states of plutonium and neptunium in 1967 (Gelman and Krot later received the State Prize of the USSR for their discovery of the heptavalency of plutonium, neptunium and americium). Gelman retained and developed connexions with her former workplaces and other radioisotope research centres, particularly the Mayak plutonium production plant and also the Siberian Chemical Combine in Tomsk and the Mining and Chemical Combine in Krasnoyarsk. Methods continued to be improved for the isolation of plutonium and neptunium salts.

In 1971, Gelman put forward the 38-year-old N.N. Krot as her replacement as the laboratory director, over the objections of some of the Academic Council of the Institute of Physics of the Academy of Sciences. She remained in a consulting role.

She died on 29 March 1994 in Moscow. She was buried at Novokuntsevo cemetery.

== Awards ==
- 1949: State Prize of the USSR, Order of Stalin, Stalin Prize, Order of the Red Banner of Labour, D.I. Mendeleev award.
- 1951: Council of Ministers Prize.
- 1982: D.I. Mendeleev award (with N.N. Krot and F.A. Sakharov)
- 1984: State Prize of the USSR.
