= Anatoly Savin =

Scientist

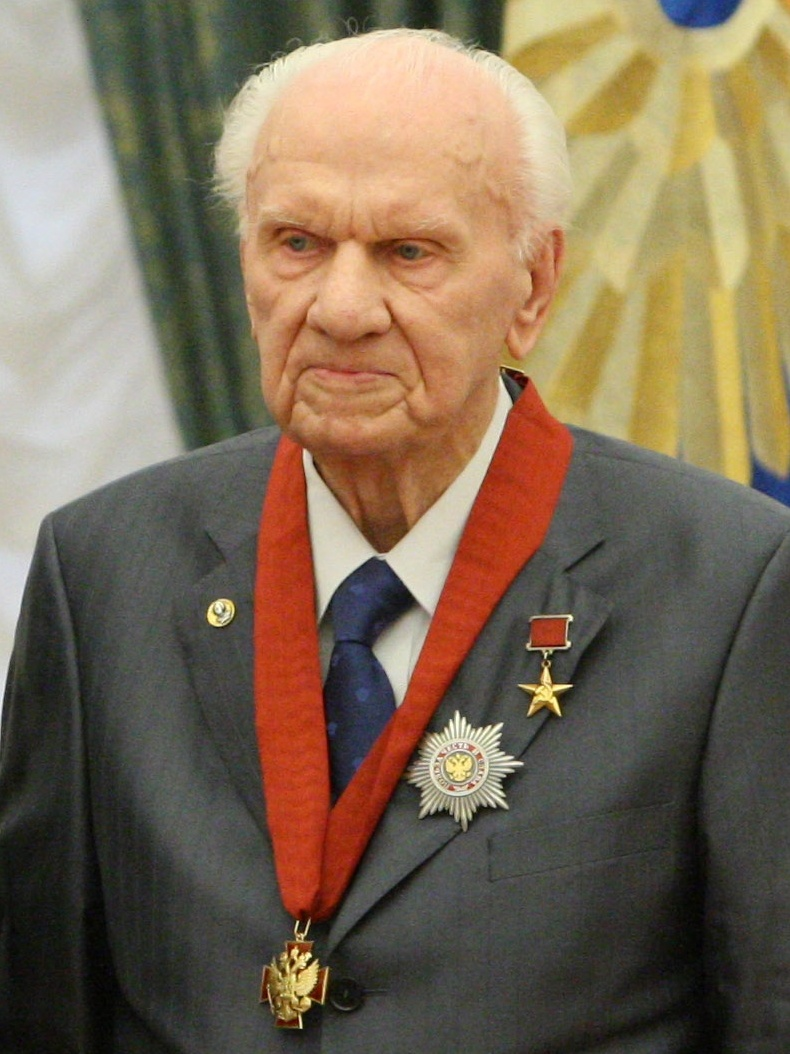
Savin in October 2012

Anatoly Ivanovich Savin (Russian: Анатолий Иванович Савин; 6 April 1920 – 27 March 2016) was a Soviet and Russian scientist. He was a specialist in the field of information and control automation systems. He was also a Doctor of Technical Sciences. Savin was the chairman of the Council on the problems of image processing and the scientific director of OJSC Almaz-Antey.

== Biography ==
Anatoly Savin was born in Ostashkov, Russian SFSR in 1920. He graduated from the Bauman Moscow Higher Technical School before World War II. After graduating he worked at Gorky Artillery Plant where in 1943 he was appointed Chief Designer. From 1945 he worked for the Soviet nuclear program designing equipment for work with nuclear fuel. In 1951 he was assigned to Design Bureau 1 (future Almaz-Antey), where he worked on the project "Satellite Destroyer", creating a system for intercepting enemy satellites on near-Earth orbits.

In 1971 he became the director of the Central R&D Institute "Kometa" working on distributed information systems with space-based elements. Among his work was the system for early warning of nuclear attack based on the infra red signatures of missile exhausts. He also led development of the naval system for intelligence and target search "Legenda" that would find targets and lead heavy anti-ship missiles using information from external sources.

In 2004-2006 he worked as the Chief Designer of Almaz-Antey corporation. In 2007-2016 he was the Chief Scientist. He died in Moscow, Russia on 27 March 2016.

== Awards and honors ==
- Three Orders of the Red Banner of Labour (1944, 1949, 1956)
- Four Orders of Lenin (1945, 1951, 1971 and 1976)
- Three Stalin Prizes (1946, 1949, 1951)
- Lenin Prize (1972)
- Hero of Socialist Labour (1976)
- USSR State Prize (1981)
- Order "For Merit to the Fatherland", 3rd class (1995)
- State Prize of the Russian Federation (1999)
- Order "For Merit to the Fatherland", 2nd class (2010)
