= Mikhail Isaakovich Sheftel =

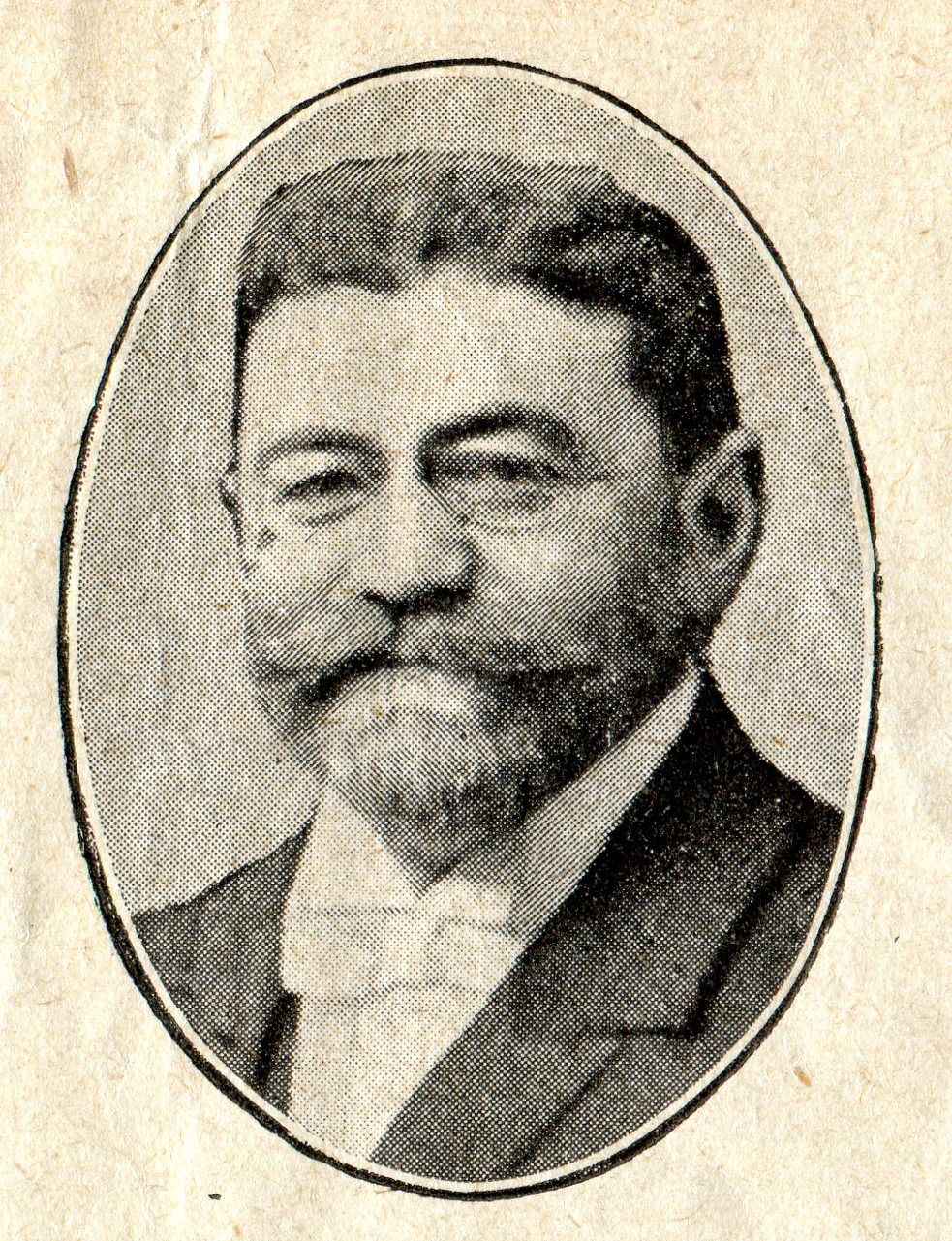
Mikhail Isaakovich Sheftel, 1906

Mikhail Isaakovich Sheftel (Russian: Михаи́л Исаа́кович Ше́фтель; 1862–1919) was a Russian Jewish lawyer, member of the First Duma of the Russian Empire in 1906. He figured among the leaders of the OPE, the Society for the Promotion of Enlightenment among the Jews of Russia.
