= Nissan Katzenelson =

Russian politician (1862–1925)

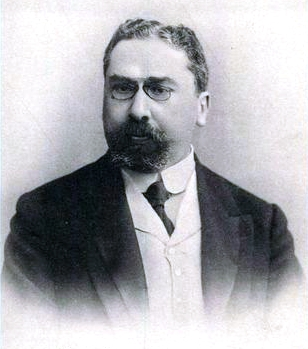

Nissan Katzenelson (Russian: Нисон Ио́сифович Каценельсо́н; 1862, Babruysk – 1925), was a Russian Jewish activist, and member of the First State Duma of the Russian Empire in 1906-1907.

A Libau banker, son of Yosef Katzenelson and Feye Breyne Katzenelson, he took part in the Third Zionist congress at Basel, and was subsequently elected to the Directorate of the Jewish Colonial Trust. A close friend of Dr. Theodor Herzl, he was invited to accompany him to Saint Petersburg in 1903. After signing the Vyborg Manifesto, he spent three months in prison and was forbidden to stand again for election.
