= Zinovy Vilensky =

Russian painter

- Зиновий Виленский
- Born: Zalman Moiseyevich Vilensky; October 15, 1899; Koriukivka, Chernigov Governorate, Russian Empire
- Died: October 13, 1984 (aged 84); Moscow, USSR
- Known for: Sculpture
- Movement: Monumental sculpture portraits
- Awards: People's Painter of the USSR (1980)

Zinovy or Zalman Moiseyevich Vilensky (Russian: Зиновий Моисеевич Виленский, 15 October 1899 – 13 October 1984) was a Soviet and Russian sculptor worked and lived in Moscow. Famous for his monumental portraits exhibited at landmarks of Russia such as Moscow, Tretyakov Gallery and many others. He was awarded Stalin Prize in 1948, Became a corresponding member of USSR Academy of Arts and a People's Painter of the USSR in 1980.

== Biography ==
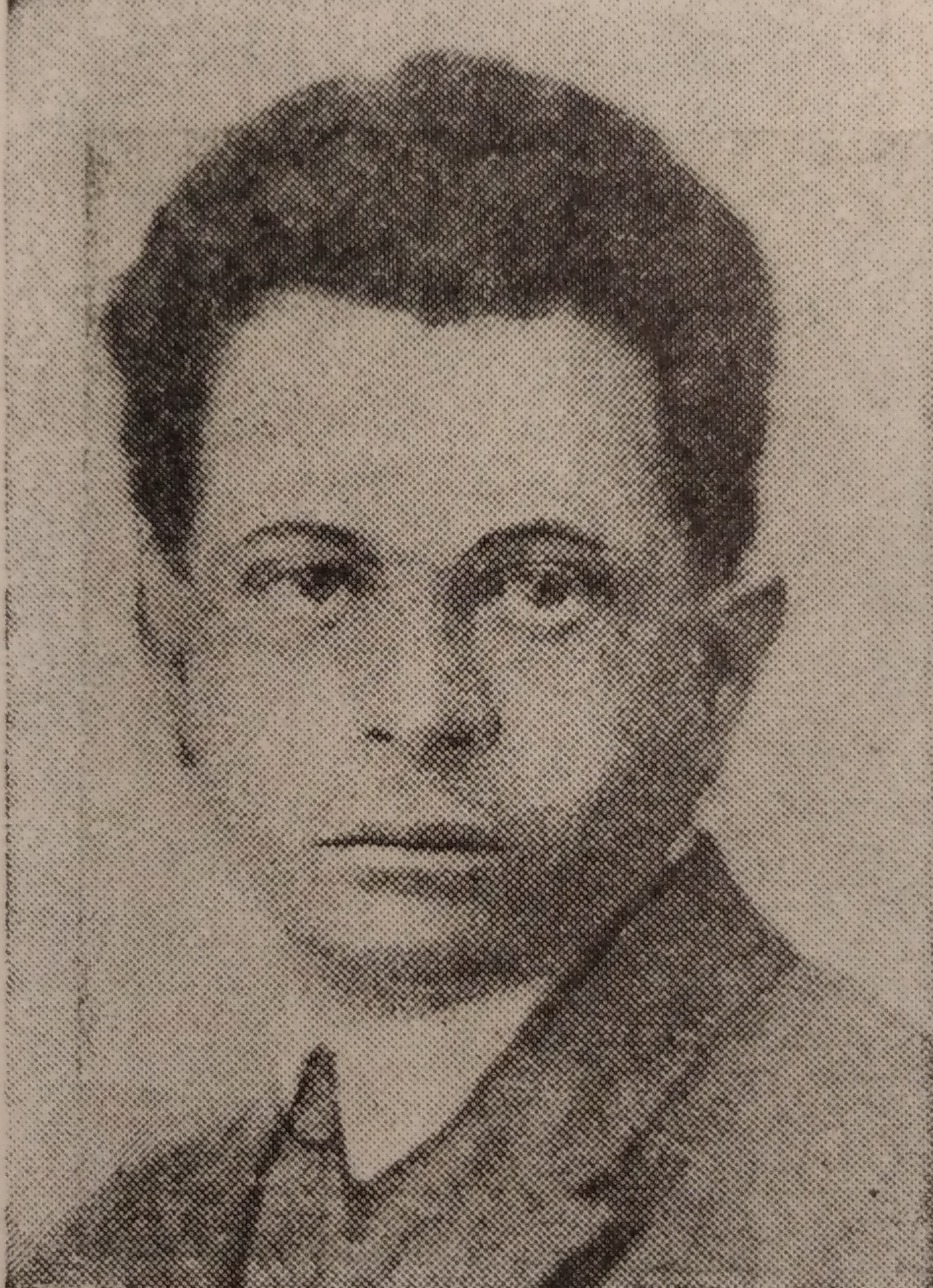
Old Z.M.Vilensky

Zinovy was born in Koriukivka, Chernigov Governorate. He finished the school at the Sugar Factory in Chernigovshina and then in 1914 entered Kiev Art College were studied till 1919 and before he had graduated moved back to his motherland, village Korukovka. He worked as a decorator in the theatre of Sugar Factory and also worked as a teacher of drawing in technical secondary school of Korukovka. Then he moved to Petrograd (now Saint Petersburg) and studied in Municipal free art workshops (Academy of Arts) preparing to enter Vkhutemas. There were no places in the School Fine Art where he wanted to enter so he entered the School of Sculpture and studied there in 1922–1928. Among his teachers were Joseph Chaikov, Ivan Efimov and Anton Lavinsky.

In 1930s he started participating in biggest art exhibitions while working on Portrait Busts and Monuments. He took part in the Exhibition organised in favour of 15 years anniversary of the Red Army in 1933 with two works in plaster: "Recon" and "Patrol". His first famous works were: monument of Vladimir Lenin in Azov, Portrait of Mikhail Kalinin and Bust of Sergei Kirov in Manufacturing plant "Dinamo"; Portraits of such well-known musicians as Konstantin Igumnov (1939) and Aleksandr Goldenweiser (1940).

During World War II Vilensky was working in metallurgical plant where he created his famous "Ural Series" of terracotta sculptures (1941–1943).

Personal exhibitions:
1943, 1944 Perm
1955, 1967, 1975 and 1980 Moscow

After the war he lived in Moscow where he died on 15 October 1984, and was buried at the Kuntsevo Cemetery.

== Notable works ==
=== Sculptures ===
Konstantin Igumnov (1939) - Plaster - Tretyakov Gallery :
Pyotr Ilyich Tchaikovsky (1949) - Marble - Tretyakov Gallery :
Semen Alekseevich Lavochkin (1947) - Marble - Tretyakov Gallery :
Stepan Elizarovich Artemenko (1948) - Bronze - Rasulovo, Odesa region :
Ivan Harlamovich Mihaylichenko (1948–1949) - Bronze - Almazniy, Lugank region :
Sergey Alekseevich Chaplygin (1950) - Plaster - NMM Zhukovsky :
Bertrand Russell (1966) - Bronze :
Mikhail Gromov (1970) - Bronze :
Sergei Korolev (1981) - Marble

=== Monuments ===
Sergei Kirov - Borovichi :
Vladimir Lenin (1957) - Bronze - Sochi, Russia:
A P Vinogradov (1977) - Marble - Alley of Heroes, St.Peterburg :
Sergei Korolev (1980) - Marble - Korolev, Russia :
G P Svishev (1982) - Marble - Alley of Heroes, St.Peterburg

== Awards ==
Stalin Prize 1948,
Corresponding member of the USSR Academy of Arts 1966,
People's Painter of the RSFSR 1969,
People's Painter of the USSR 1980

== External links and Publications ==
- Listed in Best 10,000 World artists by Russian Artists Trade Union
- Exhibition Catalogue: Vystavka Proizvedeniy Zinoviya Moiseevicha Vilenskogo ("Zinovy Moiseyevich Vilensky"). Academy of Arts and Union of Artists, Moscow 1966
- Book about Z. Vilensky: A.V.Paramonov, Moscow 1971
- Book about Z. Vilensky: Izobr. Iskusstvo, Moscow 1985
