= Aliashraf Abdulhuseyn oglu Alizade =

Azerbaijani geologist

Alashraf Abdulhuseyn oglu Alizade
- Əlizadə Alaşraf Əbdülhüseyn oğlu
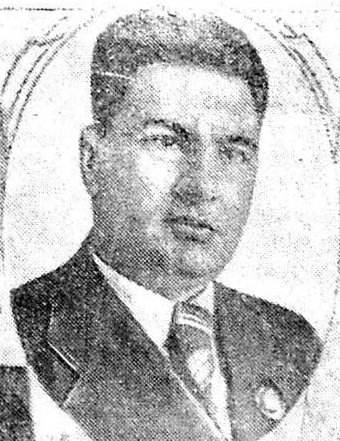
- Born: April 24, 1911; Shamakhi, Russian Empire
- Died: March 22, 1985 (aged 73); Baku, Soviet Union
- Citizenship: Azerbaijan SSR
- Awards: Order of Lenin

Academician Aliashraf Abdulhuseyn oghlu Alizade (1911–1985) was an Azerbaijani geologist. He was a full member and one of the founders of the Azerbaijan National Academy of Sciences (1945), and an Honorary Oilman of the USSR (1971). He was also a State Award laureate for the discovery and exploitation of new oil fields (1943) and for the preparation of the small electric perforator (1946).

== Publications ==
- Quick Guide for Field Geology. 1937.
- Quick Guide to the Field Geology. 1938.
- Maikop Formation of Azerbaijan and its oil potential. 1945.
- Oil fields of the Caspian region. 1945.
- Paleogene deposits of Azerbaijan. 1947.
- Earth and earthquakes. 1950.
- Oil and its origin. 1957.
- Paleogeography of the Balakhani basin. 1960.
- General Geology. 1961
- Geophysical study of the geological structure of the oil and gas-bearing regions of Azerbaijan. 1963.
