= Konstantin Vasilyev =

Russian painter

Konstantin Alexeyevich Vasilyev
- Константин Алексеевич Васильев
- Born: September 3, 1942; Maykop, USSR
- Died: October 29, 1976 (aged 34); Vasilyevo, Zelenodolsky District, Tatar Autonomous Soviet Socialist Republic, USSR
- Education: Kazan Art School
- Style: Portrait
- Awards: Musa Jalil Republican Prize

Konstantin Alexeyevich Vasilyev (Russian: Константи́н Алексе́евич Васи́льев; September 3, 1942 – October 29, 1976) was a Russian symbolist painter, who left more than 400 paintings and drawings. His range of works included portraits, landscapes, realistic compositions, Russian epics, Slavic and Teutonic mythology, and battle paintings. Vasilyev popularized legendary characters of the Russian folk art, songs and fairy tales: Ilya Muromets, Mikula Selyaninovich, Svyatogor, Dunay Ivanovich, Dobrynya Nikitich, Volga Svyatoslavich and others. His Scandinavian and Germanic saga cycle includes depictions of Odin, Freyja and valkyries. Several paintings are devoted to the Great Patriotic War of the Soviet people. These include "Marshal Zhukov", "Invasion", "The Parade of 1941" and "Nostalgia."

== In neopaganism ==
Vasilyev's works are popular among Russian neopaganism. Among the illustrations for the book Dezionization by anti-Semitic author Valery Yemelyanov, one of the founders of Russian neopaganism, there were reproductions of Vasilyev's paintings on the theme of the struggle of Russian heroes with evil forces, in particular, a painting signed in this publication as Ilya Muromets defeats the Christian plague. Reproductions of Vasilyev's paintings were placed in the Temple of the Veda Perun of the neopagan movement of Ynglism and are presented in the Slavic-Aryan Vedas, expounding the teachings of Ynglism.

== Death and legacy ==
Konstantin Vasilyev died on October 29, 1976, in a railway accident near Kazan. His family and friends never believed in the official version of his death and suspected that the painter was murdered. Vasilyev was buried in the village of Vasilyevo, where he lived since 1949. Recognition came posthumously. A documentary "Vasilyev from Vasilyevo" was released in 1978. The Konstantin Vasilyev Museum opened in Moscow in 1998. Another film about the painter under the title "A man with an eagle-owl. Konstantin Vasilyev" was made in 2002. In 2012 Konstantin Vasilyev Museum in Moscow was renamed the Konstantin Vasilyev Centre of the Slavic Culture. Next year, in 2013, the Konstantin Vasilyev Art Gallery was opened in Kazan.

Vasilyev's oeuvres steadily gained in popularity through the late Soviet and early post-Soviet periods, until they have reached a virtually iconic status among Russian nationalists, neo-pagans, and fantasy geeks.

The minor planet 3930 Vasilev, discovered by Soviet astronomer Lyudmila Zhuravlyova in 1982 is named after him.

== Bibliography ==
- Doronin, A.I. Konstantin Vasilyev. Artist at the Call of the Heart - ("golden gallery of Russian painting) / Konstantin Vasilev. Khudozhnik po zovu serdtsa. Moscow: Art-rodnik, 2008. ISBN 5979401598
- Doronin, A.I. Rusi volshebnaia palitra. Moscow: Molodaia gvardiia, 1992.
- Kazakevich, G. Khudozhnik i poėt : stikhi po kartinam Konstantina Vasilʹeva. St. Petersburg : Aleteĭia, 2015.
- Konstantin Vasilʹev glazami druzeĭ: vospominaniia, ėsse, stikhi. Kazan: Star, 1995.
- Vasilʹev, A.A. Khudozhnik Konstantin Vasil'ev. Moscow: Bronzovyĭ vek : Proekt-F, 2004.
