= Ratkovići =

Ratkovići may refer to:

- Ratkovići, Čelić, a village in Bosnia and Herzegovina
- Ratkovići, Kreševo, a village in Bosnia and Herzegovina
- Ratkovići (Goražde), a village in Bosnia and Herzegovina
- Ratkovići (Srebrenica), a village in Bosnia and Herzegovina

== See also ==
- Ratković (singular)
