= Svyatogor (disambiguation) =

Svyatogor may refer to:

- Svyatogor - the name of a Russian mythical hero
- The following things were named after him:
  - Svyatogor (aircraft) - the name of a Russian airplane in the 1910s
  - Svyatogor - the name of the Soviet icebreaker Krasin until 1927
