= Ratković =

Ratković (Serbian: Ратковић) may refer to:

- Ratković, Serbia, a village near Rekovac
- Ratković, a South Slavic surname derived from a masculine given name Ratko
  - Andrija Ratković, Serbian footballer
  - George Ratkovicz, American basketball player
  - Milorad Ratković, Bosnian Serb football player
  - Stefan Ratković, Serbian medieval nobleman
  - Zoran Ratković, Croatian football player

== See also ==
- Ratkovići (plural)
