= Churilo Plyonkovich =

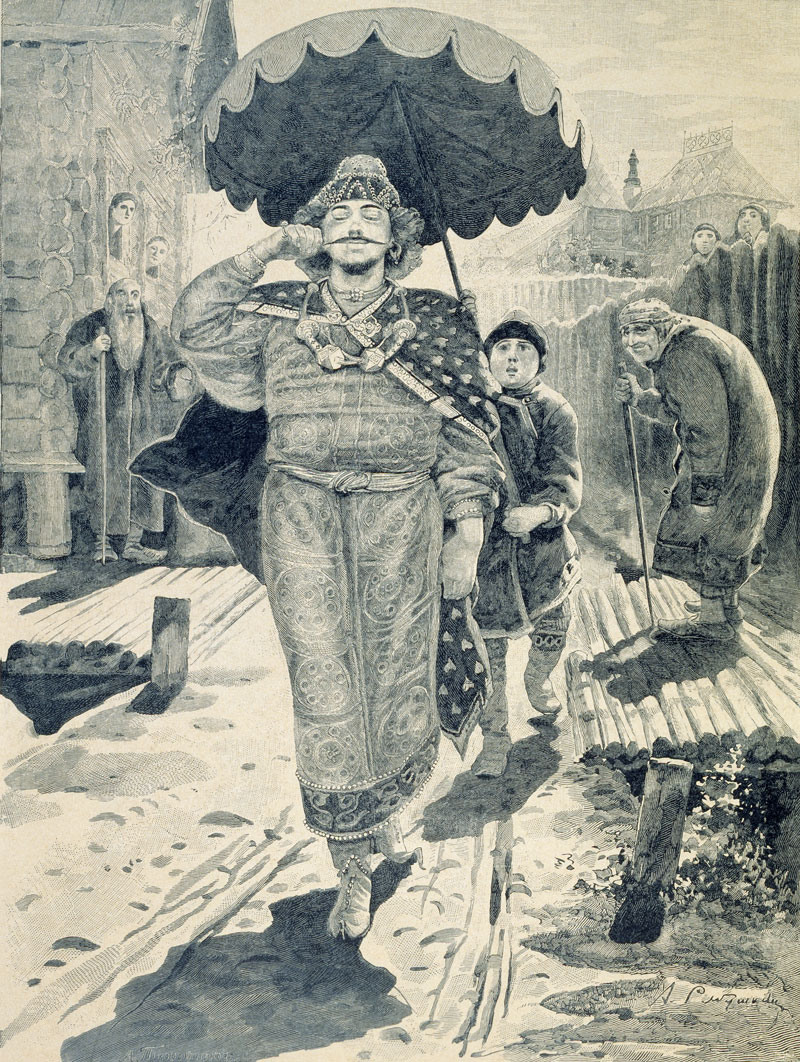
Illustration by Andrey Ryabushkin in Russian Epic Bogatyrs (1895)

Churilo or Churila Plyonkovich, also spelled Plenkovich (Russian: Чурило Плёнкович), is a hero appearing in Russian byliny (oral epic poems). He belongs to the Kievan cycle (or Galician cycle). He is presented as the best dressed man in all of Russia, and he appears at the wedding of Dunay Ivanovich and Nastasya Korolevichna.

== Sources ==
- "Чурило Пленкович" . Brockhaus and Efron Encyclopedic Dictionary (in Russian). 1906.
- Bailey, James; Ivanova, Tatyana (20 May 2015). "Churila Plyonkovich". An Anthology of Russian Folk Epics. Routledge. ISBN 978-1-317-47693-1.
- Dixon-Kennedy, Mike (8 December 1998). "Churilo Plenkovich". Encyclopedia of Russian and Slavic Myth and Legend. Bloomsbury Publishing USA. p. 52. ISBN 978-1-57607-487-9.
- Kononenko, Natalie (11 April 2025). "Byliny: Russian Folk Epic". In Beissinger, Margaret H. (ed.). The Oxford Handbook of Slavic and East European Folklore. Oxford University Press. ISBN 978-0-19-008077-8.
- Terras, Victor (1 January 1985). "Bylina". Handbook of Russian Literature. Yale University Press. ISBN 978-0-300-04868-1.
