= Slesarev =

Slesarev (Russian: Слесарев, from слесарь meaning locksmith) is a Russian masculine surname, its feminine counterpart is Slesareva. It may refer to

- Viktor Slesarev (1949–2022), Russian football coach and a former player
- Yuri Slesarev, Russian pianist

== See also ==
- Slesarev Svyatogor, a large experimental Russian aircraft constructed by Vasily Slesarev in 1916
