= Duke Stepanovich =

Character in Russian epic poems

Duke Stepanovich (Russian: Дюк Степанович) is a character in Russian byliny. The young bogatyr, who rides through a treacherous mountain pass towards the Kiev, the capital of ancient Rus', to Prince Vladimir. In this image, hungry birds swoop before him, intent on pecking him, while a dragon breathes fire at his horse's hooves.

== Background ==
Different versions of this bylina specify different motherlands for Duke Stepanovich: India, Volyn, Korela, Galich.

In this version, when he came to Kiev and met Prince Vladimir, the capital seemed poor to him and he told the prince how rich his homeland was. On the instigation of Churilo Plyonkovich, a rash young knight, Vladimir imprisoned Stepanovich and sent scouts to Duke's homeland to ascertain if Duke told the truth. The scouts returned with confirmation, and the message that if all Kiev's treasures were sold, it wouldn't be enough to buy sufficient paper to inventory Stepanovich's homeland's wealth. Churila confronts Stepanovich with a variety of tests, which ends with the Duke prevailing and Churila chastened.
