= Bogatyr =

East Slavic legendary knights

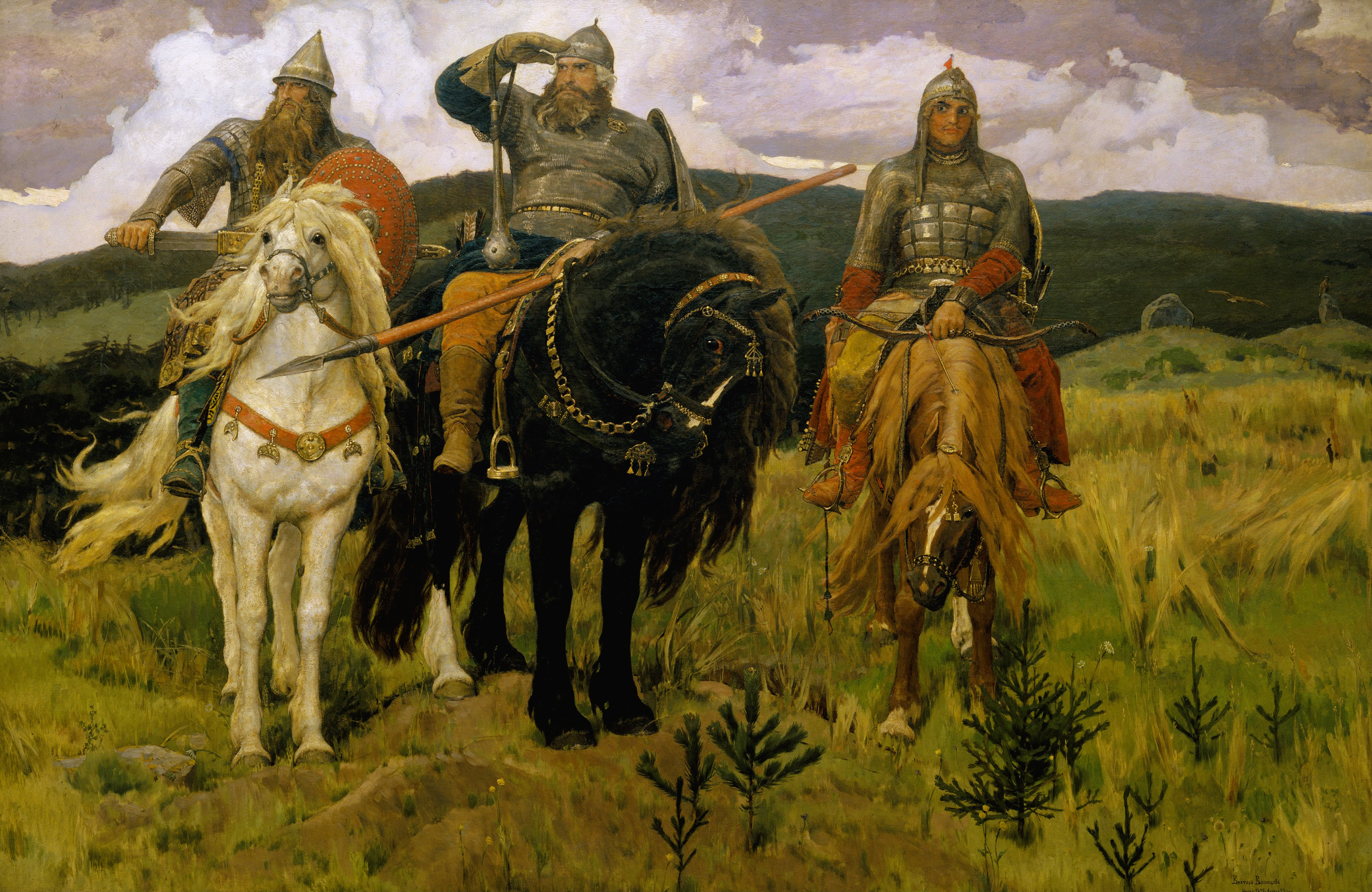
The three most famous bogatyrs, Dobrynya Nikitich, Ilya Muromets and Alyosha Popovich, appear together in Viktor Vasnetsov's 1898 painting Bogatyrs kept in the Tretyakov Gallery.

A bogatyr (Russian: богатырь, IPA: [bəɡɐˈtɨrʲ]; Ukrainian: богатир, romanized: bohatyr, IPA: [boɦɐˈtɪr]) is a stock character in medieval East Slavic legends, akin to a Western European knight-errant. Bogatyrs appear mainly in Rus' epic poems—bylinas. Historically, they came into existence during the reign of Vladimir the Great (Grand Prince of Kiev from 978 to 1015) as part of his elite warriors (druzhina), akin to Knights of the Round Table. Tradition describes bogatyrs as warriors of immense strength, courage and bravery, rarely using magic while fighting enemies in order to maintain the "loosely based on historical fact" aspect of bylinas. They are characterized as having resounding voices, with patriotic and religious pursuits, defending Rus' from foreign enemies (especially nomadic Turkic steppe-peoples or Finno-Ugric tribes in the period prior to the Mongol invasions) and their religion.

== Etymology ==
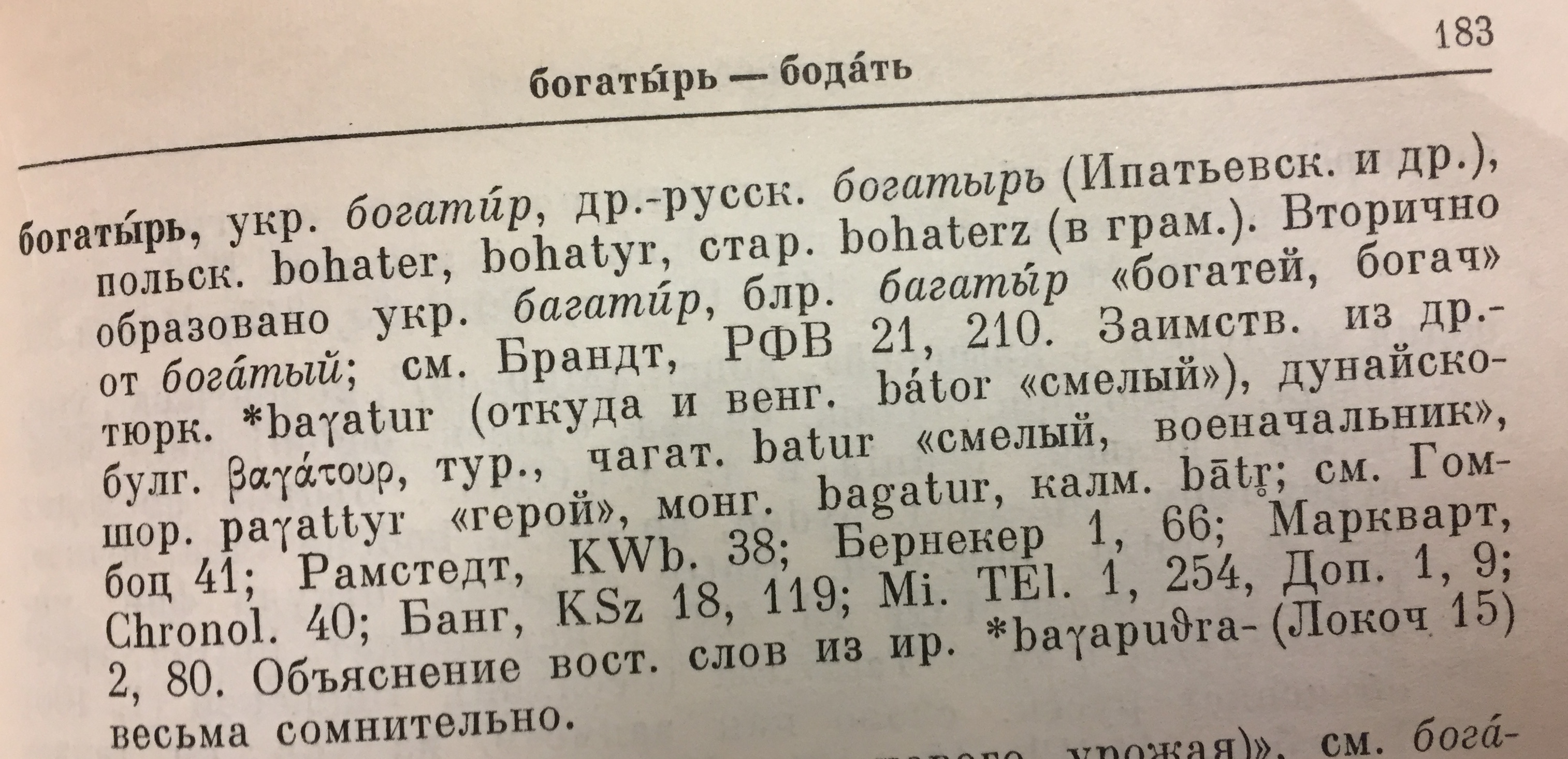
Photo of bogatyr definition in different languages from Max Vasmer's Russian Etymological Dictionary

The word bogatyr is mentioned in Russia in the 13th century. It is noted as being of non-Slavic origin and being either derived from Iranian bahadur ("god's servant"), Turco-Mongol bahadar, bahadir, bahadur, batur, batyr, bator (see baghatur) meaning "brave warrior", or the Sanskrit bhagadhara ("having happiness, being lucky"). In Russian, bogatyr has three meanings: "Russian epic hero or courageous warrior with extraordinary power"; "daring, strong and courageous warrior"; "physically strong, tall and powerful". The term bogatyr replaced (or became a synonym) of the Russian horobor, hrabr ("brave"). It is a cognate of Hungarian batór ("courageous").

The term vityaz (Russian: витязь, IPA: [ˈvʲitʲɪsʲ]; Ukrainian: витязь, romanized: vytiaz, IPA: [ˈwɪtʲɐzʲ]), translated as "knight", comes from Proto-Slavic *vitędzь, from Proto-Germanic *wīkingaz through a West Germanic intermediary. The earliest attested form is Old English wicing, "pirate", corresponding to modern English viking. This in turn probably comes from Latin vicus with the Germanic suffix *-inga-, indicating belonging. In Germanic and Latin sources, the word has negative connotations. The circumstances of borrowing, and how it came to mean "hero" in Slavic, remain unclear. Alternatively, per Brückner and Machek, the Proto-Slavic term could be of native Slavic origin, "victory" or "trophy".

== Overview ==
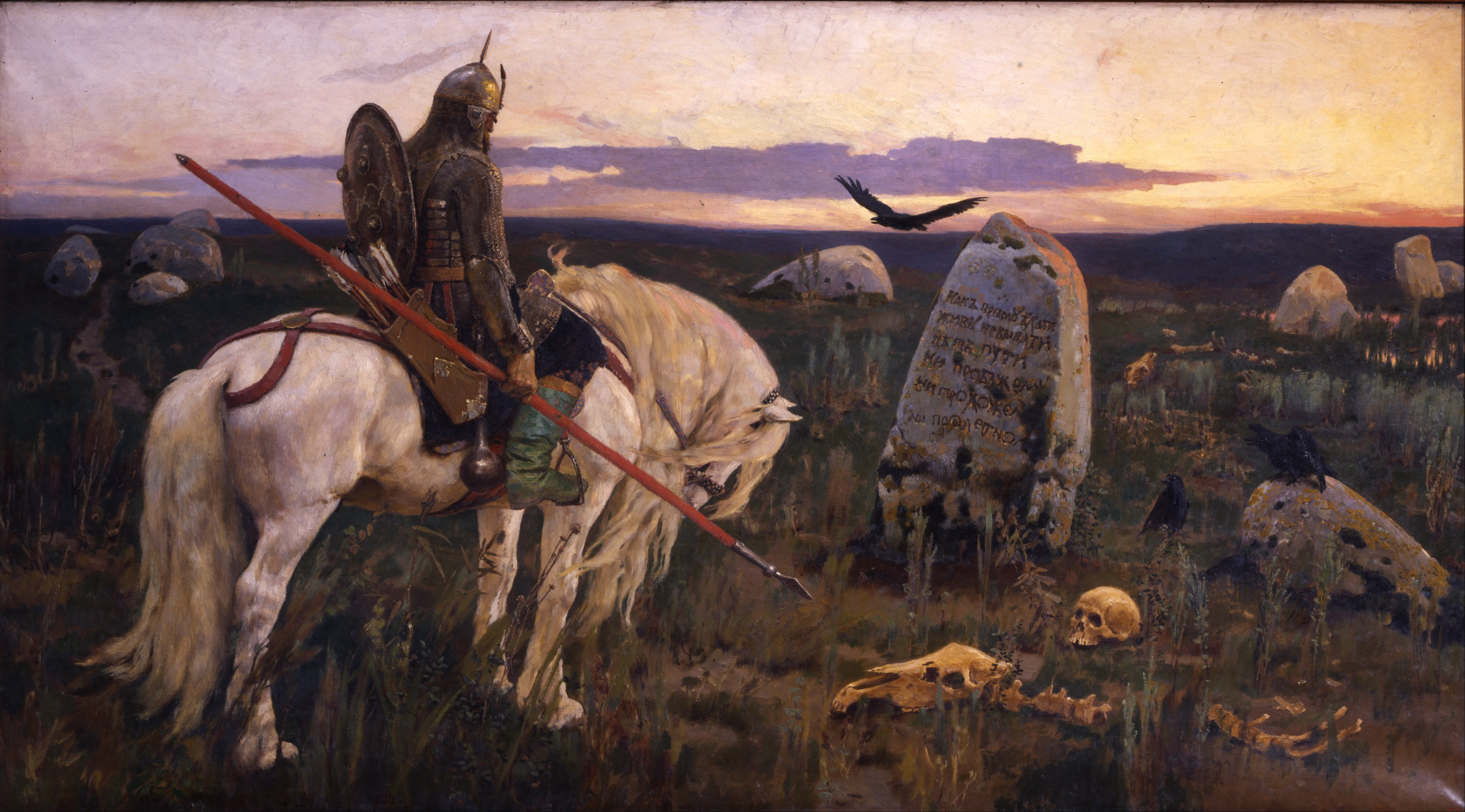
Knight (Vityaz) at the Crossroads, Viktor Vasnetsov (1882), Russian Museum

Many Rus epic poems, called bylina , prominently featured stories about these heroes, as did several chronicles, including the 13th century Galician–Volhynian Chronicle. Some bogatyrs are presumed to be historical figures, while others, like the giant Svyatogor, are purely fictional and possibly echo figures in pagan Slavic mythology. Some scholars divide the epic poems into three collections: the Mythological epics, older stories from before the founding of Kievan Rus' and Christianization, and included magic and the supernatural; the Kievan Cycle, which contains the largest number of bogatyrs and their stories (Ilya Muromets, Dobrynya Nikitich, and Alyosha Popovich); and the Novgorod cycle, focused on Sadko and Vasily Buslayev, which depicts everyday life in Novgorod.

Many of the stories about bogatyrs revolve around the court of Vladimir I of Kiev (r. 980–1015) and feature in the Kievan Cycle. The most notable bogatyrs or vityazes served at his court: the trio of Alyosha Popovich, Dobrynya Nikitich and Ilya Muromets. Each of them tends to be known for a certain character trait: Alyosha for his wits, Dobrynya for his courage, and Ilya for his physical and spiritual power and integrity, and for his dedication to the protection of his homeland and people. Most of those bogatyrs' adventures are fictional, and often included fighting dragons, giants and other mythical creatures. However, the bogatyrs themselves were often based on real people. Historical prototypes exist both for Dobrynya Nikitich (the warlord Dobrynya) and for Ilya Muromets.

The Novgorod Republic produced a specific kind of hero, an adventurer rather than a noble warrior. The most prominent examples were Sadko and Vasily Buslayev, who became part of the Novgorod Cycle of folk epics.

The most prominent heroes in these epics are Svyatogor and Volkh Vseslavyevich; they are commonly called the "elder bogatyrs".

Later notable bogatyrs also include those who fought alongside Alexander Nevsky (1221–1263) – including Vasily Buslayev – and those who fought in the 1380 Battle of Kulikovo.

Kievan bogatyrs and their heroic tales have influenced figures in Russian literature and art, such Alexander Pushkin, who wrote the 1820 epic fairy-tale poem Ruslan and Ludmila, Viktor Vasnetsov, and Andrei Ryabushkin whose artworks depict many bogatyrs from the different cycles of folk epics. Bogatyrs are also mentioned in wonder tales in a more playful light as in "Foma Berennikov", a story in Aleksandr Afanas'ev's collection Russian Fairy Tales featuring Alyosha Popovich and Ilya Muromets.

Red Medusa Animation Studio, based in Russia, created an animated parody of the bogatyrs called "Three Russian Bogaturs", in which the titular characters—strong and tenacious, but not overly bright—prevail against various opponents from fairy tales, pop culture, and modern life.

== Female bogatyr ==
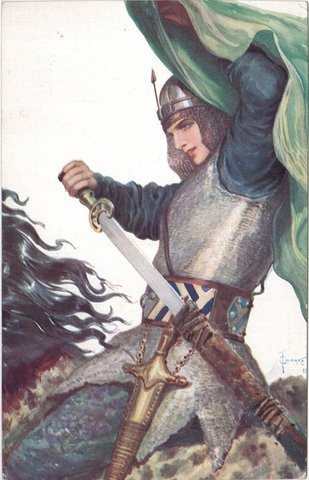
Sergey Solomko. Bogatyr, Nastasya Korolevichna.

Though not as heavily researched, the female bogatyr or polianitsa (поляница) is a female warrior akin to the Amazons. Many of the more well-known polianitsas are wives to the famous male bogatyrs, such as Nastas'ya Nikulichna, the wife of Dobrynya Nikitich. While the female bogatyr doesn't quite match the men in strength and bravery, there are stories detailing instances where they save their husbands and outwit the enemy. They are often seen working with the heroes in tales that mention their presence.

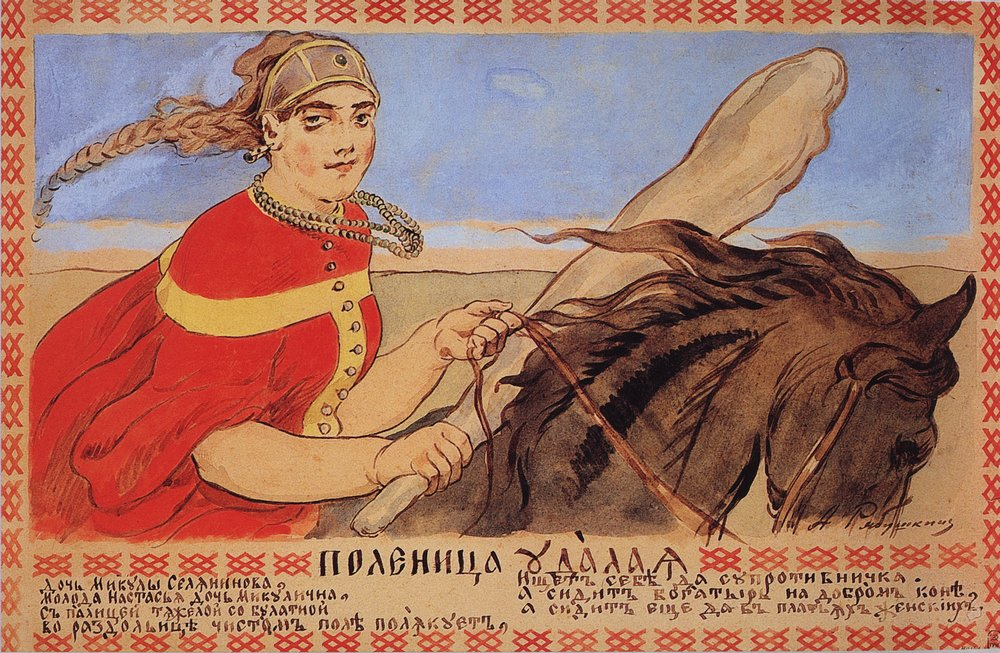
Nastasya Mikulichna, daughter of Mikula Selyaninovich (art by A. Ryabushkin, 1898)

== Characters ==
Most bogatyrs are fictional, but are believed to be based on historical prototypes:

- The Three Bogatyrs:
  - Ilya Muromets, regarded as the greatest of the bogatyrs, from village of Karacharovo, near Murom;
  - Dobrynya Nikitich – based on a historical warlord of Vladimir I, associated with Ryazan;
  - Alyosha Popovich ("Alyosha the Priest's Son") – from Rostov.
- Mykyta Kozhumyaka, bogatyr and a folk hero snake wrestler, in honor of which Pereyaslav was named
- Evpaty Kolovrat, bogatyr described in The Tale of the Destruction of Ryazan, he fought an army of the Mongol ruler Batu Khan
- Svyatogor, mythological figure, a giant knight who bequeathed his strength to Ilya Muromets
- Vasily Buslayev of Novgorod (Novgorod Cycle)
- Anika the Warrior, mythological figure, loosely based on Digenes Akritas.
- Duke Stepanovich, mythological figure
- Dunay Ivanovich, mythological figure
- Volga Svyatoslavovich, mythological figure, possibly based on Oleg of Novgorod or Vseslav of Polotsk.
- Sukhman The Bogatyr, mythological figure
- Mikula Selyaninovich, mythological figure

Some of the historical warriors also entered folklore and became known as bogatyrs:

- Gavrila Aleksich of Novgorod, historical figure who served Alexander Nevsky in Battle of Neva
- Ratmir of Novgorod, historical figure who served Alexander Nevsky in Battle of Neva
- Peresvet, historical figure who sacrificed himself against the Tatars at the Battle of Kulikovo
- The Bogatyrs of the Aiyy tribes in the Sakha Olonkho epic Nurgun Botur the Swift.

== Bogatyrs in films ==
- Films by Alexander Ptushko:
  - Sadko (Садко, 1953)
  - Ilya Muromets (Илья Муромец, 1956)
  - Ruslan and Ludmila (Руслан и Людмила, 1972), based on a fantasy poem of the same name by Alexander Pushkin.
- Soyuzmultfilm animated films (directed by Ivan Aksenchuk):
  - Ilya Muromets (1975)
  - Ilya Muromets and Nightingale the Robber (1978)
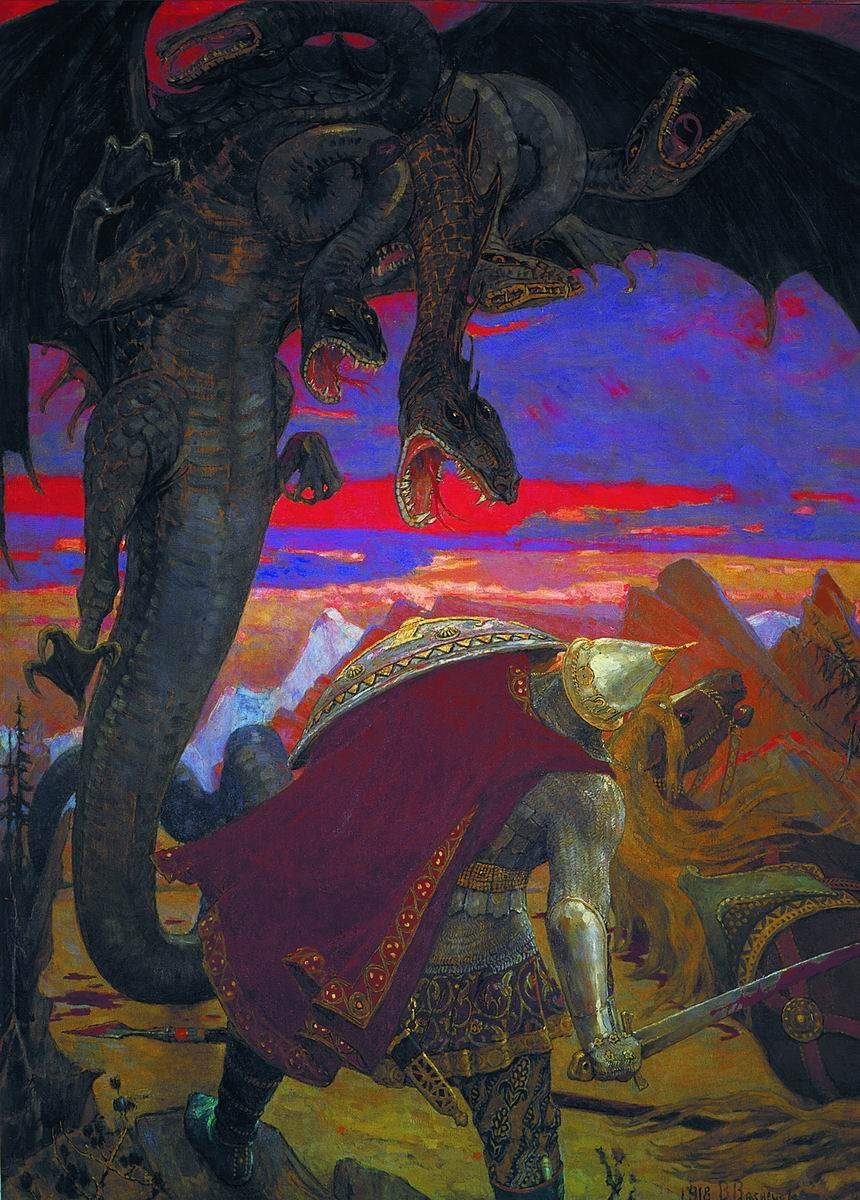
    Viktor Vasnetsov. Dobrynya Nikitich and the Dragon, 1913–1918.
- Melnitsa Animation series The Three Bogatyrs:
  - Alyosha Popovich and Tugarin the Serpent (Алёша Попович и Тугарин Змей, 2004)
  - Dobrynya Nikitich and Zmey Gorynych (Добрыня Никитич и Змей Горыныч, 2006)
  - Ilya Muromets and Nightingale the Robber (Илья Муромец и Соловей-Разбойник, 2007)
  - The Three Bogatyrs and Shamakhan Queen (Три богатыря и Шамаханская царица, 2010)
  - The Three Bogatyrs on Distant Shores (Три богатыря на дальних берегах, 2012)
  - The Three Bogatyrs: Course of the horse (Три богатыря: Ход конём)
  - The Three Bogatyrs and the Sea King (Три богатыря и Морской царь)
- Other films:
  - The Dragon Spell (Микита Кожум'яка, 2016) is a 2016 Ukrainian 3D animated fantasy film directed by Manuk Depoyan based on Anton Siyanika's fairy tale of the same name.
  - Mykyta Kozhumyaka (1965) animated Soviet cartoon based on folk tales from the times of Kievan Rus'
  - Alexander Nevsky (Александр Невский, 1938) by Sergei Eisenstein. Although based on real history, the film also shows a strong bylina influence and features bylina bogatyr Vasily Buslayev as a secondary character.
  - The Battle of Kerzhenets (1971)
  - Vasilisa Mikulishna (1975, by Roman Davydov), an animated adaptation of a bylina of the same name.
  - Prince Vladimir (Князь Владимир, 2006) also combines real medieval history with fantasy and folklore.
  - Last Knight (2017), a comedy film that deconstructs Russian folklore.

== See also ==
- Baghatur
- Knight-errant
- Slavic mythology
- The Bogatyr Gates, a movement from Mussorgsky's piano suite "Pictures at an Exhibition".
- Vitez (Serbia)
