= Alexander Nevsky (film) =

1938 film by Sergei Eisenstein

- DVD cover
- Directed by: Sergei Eisenstein; Dmitri Vasilyev
- Written by: Pyotr Pavlenko; Sergei Eisenstein
- Starring: Nikolay Cherkasov; Nikolay Okhlopkov; Andrei Abrikosov
- Cinematography: Eduard Tisse
- Edited by: Sergei Eisenstein; Esfir Tobak
- Music by: Sergei Prokofiev
- Production company: Mosfilm
- Distributed by: Amkino Corporation U.S.
- Release date: 1 December 1938
- Running time: 111 minutes
- Country: Soviet Union
- Language: Russian

Alexander Nevsky (Russian: Алекса́ндр Не́вский) is a 1938 Soviet historical drama film directed by Sergei Eisenstein. It depicts the attempted invasion of Novgorod in the 13th century by the Teutonic Knights of the Holy Roman Empire and their defeat by Prince Alexander, known popularly as Alexander Nevsky (1220–1263).

Eisenstein made the film in association with Dmitri Vasilyev and with a script co-written with Pyotr Pavlenko; they were assigned to ensure that Eisenstein did not stray into "formalism" and to facilitate shooting on a reasonable timetable. It was produced by Goskino via the Mosfilm production unit, with Nikolai Cherkasov in the title role and a musical score by Sergei Prokofiev. Alexander Nevsky was the first and most popular of Eisenstein's three sound films. Eisenstein, Pavlenko, Cherkasov and Abrikosov were awarded the Stalin Prize in 1941 for the film.

In 1978, the film was included in the world's 100 best motion pictures according to an opinion poll conducted by the Italian publishing house Arnoldo Mondadori Editore.

Russia Beyond considers the film one of the 10 best Russian war films.

== Plot ==
Alexander Nevsky (1938)

An army of the Teutonic Order invades and conquers the city of Pskov with the help of the traitor Tverdilo, and massacres its population. Novgorod is their next intended target.

Despite resistance from the boyars and merchants of Novgorod (urged on by the monk Ananias, Tverdilo's henchman), an appeal is made to Alexander Yaroslavich Nevsky, to again become their prince and defend Novgorod. To do so he rallies the common people of the Novgorod area. In the decisive Battle of the Ice, on the surface of frozen Lake Chudskoe, the Teutonic forces are defeated. Pskov is retaken, and there Nevsky passes judgment: the surviving Teutonic foot-soldiers are set free, while the surviving Teutonic knights will be held for ransom. Tverdilo the traitor, together with a Catholic priest who blessed the burning alive of Pskov children, disappear as they are mobbed by the onlookers.

A subplot throughout is the rivalry and friendship of Vasili Buslai and Gavrilo Oleksich, two famous (and historic) warriors of Novgorod. Both become commanders of the Novgorod forces, and are engaged in a contest of courage and fighting skill in order to decide which will win the hand of Olga Danilovna, a Novgorod maiden whom both are courting.

At the same time Vasilisa, daughter of a boyar of Pskov killed by the Teutons, joins the Novgorod forces as a soldier. She and Vasili wind up fighting side by side; she throws him a weapon when he is surrounded and weaponless, and it is she who finds and slays Ananias.

Gavrilo and Vasili are seriously wounded and are found by Olga, who retrieves them from the battlefield. Though they defer to each other, in the end Vasili publicly states that neither was the bravest in battle: that honor goes to Vasilisa, followed by Gavrilo. Thus Gavrilo and Olga are united while Vasili chooses Vasilisa as his bride-to-be (with her unspoken consent).

== Cast ==
- Nikolay Cherkasov as Prince Alexander Nevsky
- Nikolay Okhlopkov as Vasili Buslaev
- Andrei Abrikosov as Gavrilo Oleksich
- Dmitry Orlov as Ignat, the master armorer
- Vasili Novikov as Pavsha, a voivode of Pskov
- Nikolai Arsky as Domash Tverdislavich, a Novgorod boyar
- Varvara Massalitinova as Amelfa Timoferevna, Buslay's Mother
- Valentina Ivashova as Olga Danilovna, a maid of Novgorod
- Aleksandra Danilova as Vasilisa, a maid of Pskov
- Vladimir Yershov as Andreas von Velven, the Grand Master of the Teutonic Order
- Sergei Blinnikov as Tverdilo, the traitor of Pskov
- Ivan Lagutin as Ananiy, a Monk
- Lev Fenin as the Archbishop
- Naum Rogozhin as the Black-Hooded Monk

== 1930s political context ==
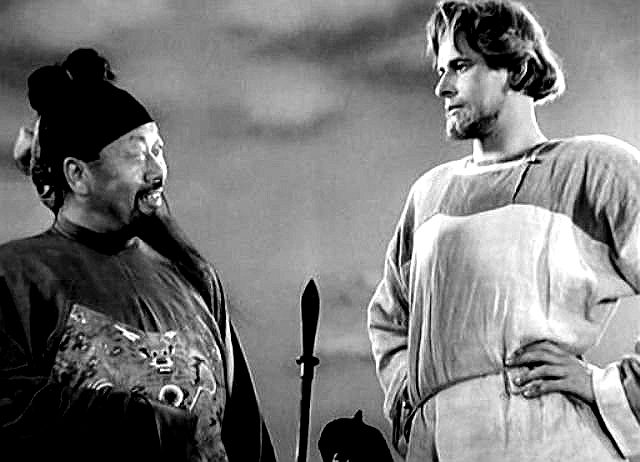
Alexander (Nikolay Cherkasov) declines a Mongol ambassador's offer to join the Golden Horde

Eisenstein made Alexander Nevsky, his first completed film in 10 years, during the Stalin era, at a time of strained relations between the Soviet Union and Nazi Germany. The film contains elements of obvious allegory that reflect the political situation between the two countries at the time of production. Some types of helmets worn by the Teutonic infantry resemble mock-ups of Stahlhelms from World War I. In the first draft of the Alexander Nevsky script, swastikas even appeared on the invaders' helmets. The film portrays Alexander as a folk hero and shows him bypassing a fight with the Mongols, his old foes, in order to face the more dangerous enemy.

The film also conveys highly anti-clerical and anti-Catholic messages. The knights' bishop's miter is adorned with swastikas, while religion plays a minor role on the Russian side, being present mostly as a backdrop in the form of Novgorod's St. Nicholas Cathedral and the clerics with their icons during the victorious entry of Nevsky into the city after the battle.

The film stemmed from a literary scenario entitled Rus, written by Pyotr Pavlenko, a Soviet novelist who conformed to socialist realist orthodoxy. The authorities could rely on Pavlenko, in his role of "consultant", to report any wayward tendencies on Eisenstein's part.

Alexander Nevsky stresses as a central theme the importance of the common people in saving Russia, while portraying the nobles and merchants as "bourgeoisie" and enemies of the people who do nothing, a motif that was heavily employed.

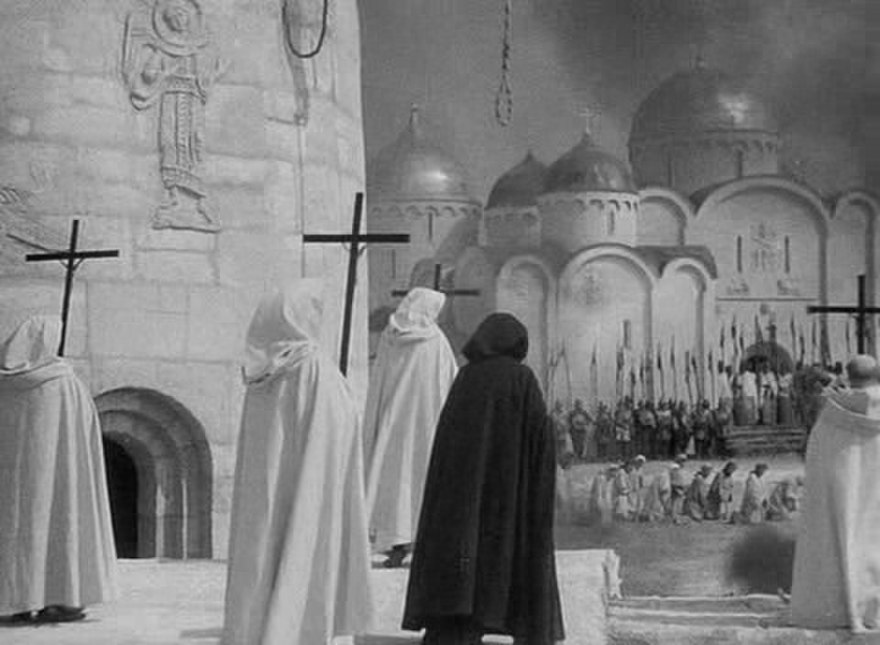
Teutonic knights take over Pskov

While shooting the film, Eisenstein published an article in the official newspaper of record Izvestia entitled "Alexander Nevsky and the Rout of the Germans". He drew a specific parallel between Nevsky and Stalin. As a result, the Kremlin requested an advance screening and, without Eisenstein being consulted, his assistants showed the footage to the General Secretary. During the process of this screening, one of the reels, which featured a scene depicting a brawl among the populace of Novgorod, disappeared. Whether it was left behind in the editing room inadvertently or whether Stalin saw the footage and objected to it, the filmmakers decided to destroy the reel permanently, since it had not received Stalin's explicit approval. Stalin was reported to be very happy with the cut of the film he was shown.

The picture was released in December 1938, and became a great success with audiences: on 15 April 1939, Semen Dukelsky – the chairman of the State Committee for Cinematography – reported that it had already been viewed by 23,000,000 people and was the most popular of the films made in recent times.

After 23 August 1939, when the USSR signed the Molotov–Ribbentrop Pact, which provided for non-aggression and collusion between Germany and the Soviet Union, Alexander Nevsky was removed from circulation. However, the situation reversed dramatically on 22 June 1941 after the Axis invasion of the Soviet Union, and the film rapidly returned to Soviet and western screens.

== Style ==
Alexander Nevsky is less experimental in its narrative structure than Eisenstein's previous films; it tells one story with a single narrative arc and focuses on one main character. The special effects and cinematography were some of the most advanced at the time.

The film climaxes in the half-hour Battle of the Ice, propelled by Prokofiev's ominous, rousing, triumphant musical narrative, a sequence that has served as a model for epic movie battles ever since (e.g., Henry V, Spartacus, The Empire Strikes Back). This climactic set piece was the first to be filmed and, since it was shot during a blazing hot summer on a location outside Moscow, cinematographer Eduard Tisse had to take extraordinary steps to render a wintry landscape, including: use of a filter to suggest winter light, painting all the trees light blue and dusting them with chalk, creating an artificial horizon out of sand, and constructing simulated ice sheets out of asphalt and melted glass, supported by floating pontoons that were deflated on cue so that the ersatz ice sheets would shatter under the weight of the Teutonic knights according to pre-cut patterns.

== Musical score ==
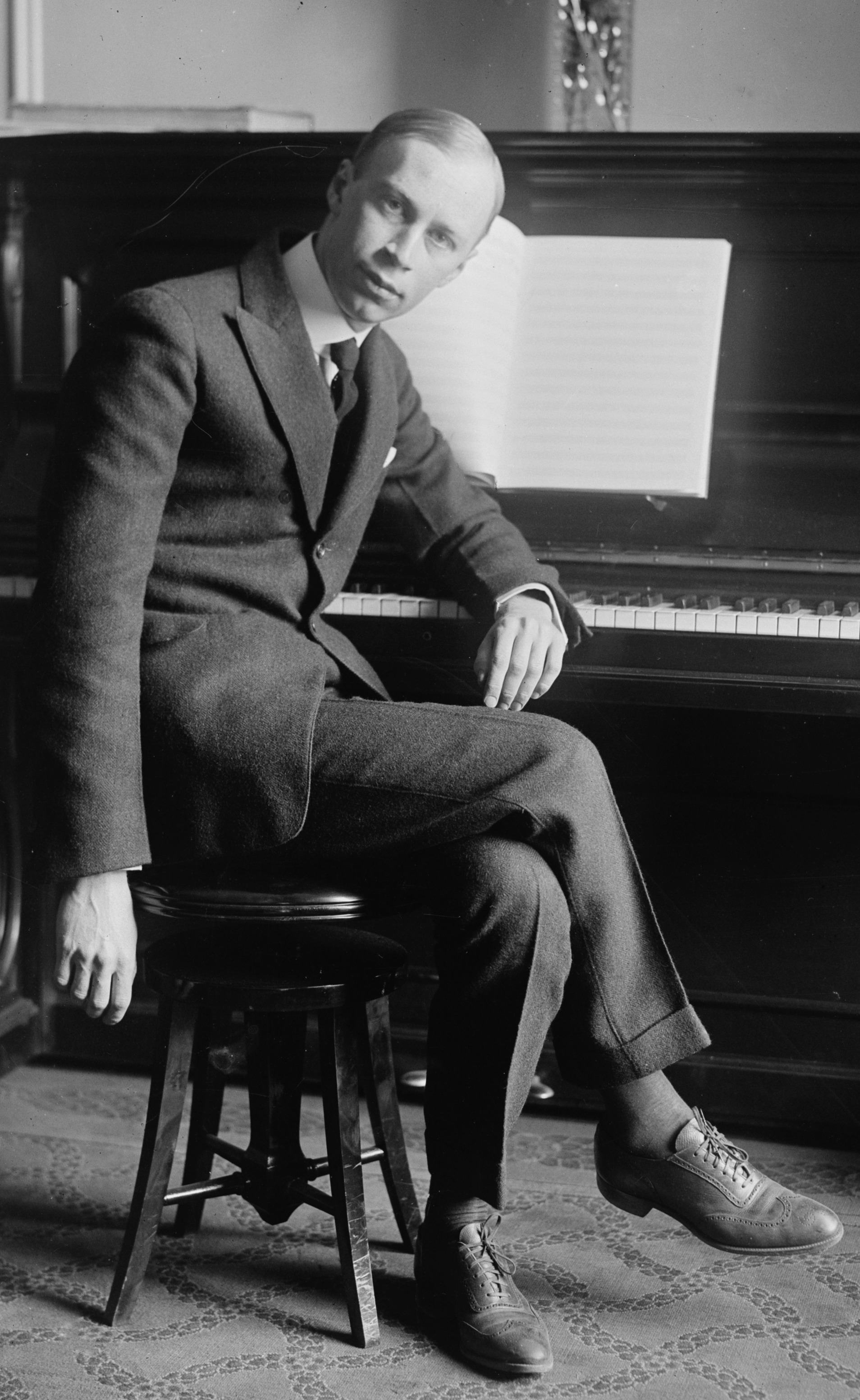
Sergei Prokofiev

Video of performance of "Song about Alexander Nevsky", Section 2 of Alexander Nevsky cantata. Length: 2 min, 56 sec

The film was the first of Eisenstein's dramatic films to use sound. (The earlier Bezhin Meadow had also used sound, but production was shut down and most of the finished scenes were destroyed.) The film's score was composed by Sergei Prokofiev, who later reworked the score into a concert cantata. The creation of Alexander Nevsky was a collaboration in the fullest sense of the word: some of the film was shot to Prokofiev's music and some of Prokofiev's music was composed to Eisenstein's footage. Prokofiev viewed the film's rough cut as the first step in composing its inimitable score. The strong and technically innovative collaboration between Eisenstein and Prokofiev in the editing process resulted in a match of music and imagery that remains a standard for filmmakers. Valery Gergiev, the principal conductor of the London Symphony Orchestra, has stated his opinion that Prokofiev's music for this film is "the best ever composed for the cinema".

== Film and concerts ==
In the 1990s a new, cleaner print became available. A number of symphony orchestras gave performances of Prokofiev's cantata, synchronized with a showing of the new print. The New York Philharmonic, the Detroit Symphony Orchestra, the San Francisco Symphony, the Philadelphia Orchestra, and the Baltimore Symphony Orchestra are five such ensembles. The concerts were quite popular, because Prokofiev's music is badly degraded by the original soundtrack recording, which suffers from extreme distortion and limited frequency response, as well as cuts to the original score to fit scenes that had already been shot. The cantata not only restored cuts but considerably expanded parts of the score.

== New editions of the film ==
In 1986, the film was restored. The film was cleared, the film studio logo was added, the captions were replaced (only the font, but not the content), the music was re-recorded by Emin Khachaturian conducting the State Symphony Cinema Orchestra.

In 1995, a new edition of the film was issued on VHS and laserdisc, for which Prokofiev's score was entirely re-recorded in hi-fi digital stereo by Yuri Temirkanov conducting the St. Petersburg Philharmonic Orchestra and Chorus, although the dialogue portions of the soundtrack were left unchanged. This enabled a new generation to experience Eisenstein's film and Prokofiev's score in high fidelity, rather than having to settle for the badly recorded musical portion that had existed since the film's original release. There is no version of the re-recorded score available on DVD.

On the review aggregator website Rotten Tomatoes, 91% of 22 critics' reviews are positive, with an average rating of 8.8/10.

== In popular culture ==
Multiple works have been influenced by or refer to Alexander Nevsky.

=== Films ===
- Scenes from the film were later incorporated into the American propaganda film The Battle of Russia (1943).
- Love and Death (1975), written and directed by Woody Allen, parodies Russian film and literature. The film used the Alexander Nevsky score.
- Wizards (1977) uses stock footage from the film in its battle sequences, which were animated using rotoscoping.
- Certain scenes in John Milius's fantasy epic Conan the Barbarian (1982) were influenced by Alexander Nevsky. The introduction of Thulsa Doom and his henchmen after the destruction of Conan's village is reminiscent of the depiction of the Grand Master of the Teutonic Knights and his fellow knights after the conquest of Pskov. With its score and choreography, the final ride and attack of the Riders of Doom against Conan resembles the Teutonic Order's cavalry approaching Nevsky in the Battle of Lake Peipus; also, the Enigma of Steel, a major theme of the Conan film, is already mentioned by Nevsky during the final Battle of the Ice.
- In Red Dawn (1984), the marquee at the movie theater in occupied America is showing the film.
- Several additional films have scenes strongly influenced by the depiction of the Battle of the Ice, including:
  - Doctor Zhivago (1965)
  - Chimes at Midnight (1965)
  - Billion Dollar Brain (1967)
  - The Empire Strikes Back (1980)
  - Mulan (1998)
  - King Arthur (2004)

=== Literature ===
- Tom Clancy's novel Red Storm Rising (1986) depicts two American intelligence officers watching Alexander Nevsky (on an unauthorized Soviet state television satellite feed) on the eve of World War III. The officers take note of an improved sound track, as well as the anti-German sentiment and strong sense of Russian (as opposed to Soviet) nationalism. The next day, as part of a plot to split the NATO alliance politically, KGB agents detonate a bomb in the Kremlin, killing a group of children from Pskov, and later arrest a West German sleeper agent on charges of terrorism.
- Nevsky: Hero of the People (2012), a graphic novel adaptation of the film, was written by Ben McCool, with art by Mario Guevara and published by IDW Publishing.

== See also ==
- Ilya Muromets (film)
