= Russian State Symphony Orchestra =

Russian State Symphony Orchestra may be used of distinct ensembles:

- The State Academic Symphony Orchestra of the Russian Federation (Svetlanov Symphony Orchestra), formerly the much-recorded USSR State Symphony Orchestra
- The State Symphony Capella of Russia, formerly the USSR Ministry of Culture Symphony Orchestra
- The State Symphony Cinema Orchestra, a cinematographic orchestra of Russia
