= Volga Svyatoslavich =

Russian epic hero

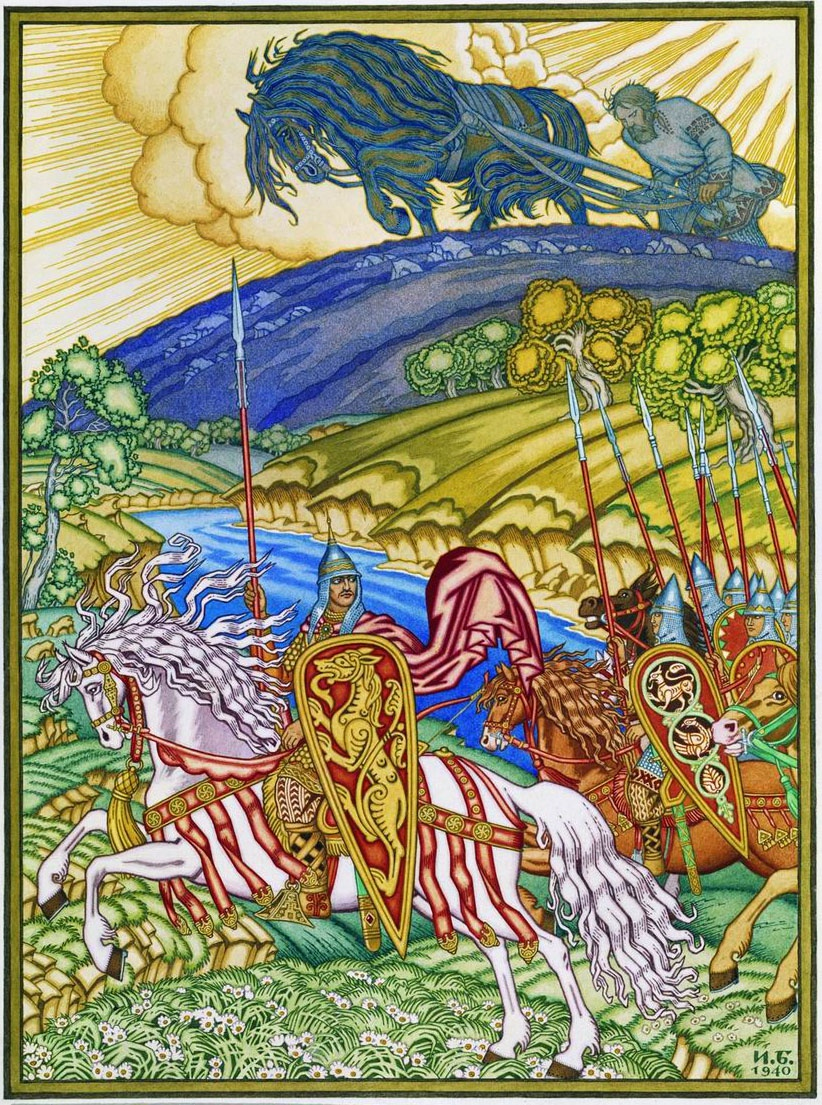
Volga Svyatoslavich and Mikula Selyaninovich, by Ivan Bilibin

Volga Svyatoslavich (Russian: Вольга Святославич) or Volkh Vseslavyevich (Russian: Волх Всеславьевич) is a Russian epic hero, a bogatyr, from the Novgorod Republic bylina cycle.
