= Ratko =

Given name

- Gender: male

Origin
- Origin: Slavic
- Meaning: rat ("war, fight")

Other names
- Related names: Ratibor, Ratimir

Ratko (Cyrillic script: Ратко) is a male given name of Slavic origin. It is a diminutive form of the names Ratibor and Ratimir.

== Notable people ==
- Ratko Čolić (1918–1999), Serbian footballer
- Ratko Dautovski, Macedonian percussionist, interested in world percussion
- Ratko Delorko (born 1959), German pianist, composer, producer and conductor
- Ratko Đokić (1940–2003), Yugoslavian-Swedish mob boss, a leader of the so-called "Cigarette Mafia"
- Ratko Dostanić (born 1959), Serbian football (soccer) head coach
- Ratko Glavina (born 1941), Croatian actor
- Ratko Janev (1939–2019), physicist
- Ratko Kacian (1917–1949), Croatian footballer
- Ratko Mladić (1942–2026), Chief of Staff of the Bosnian Serb Army during the Bosnian War of 1992–1995
- Ratko Nikolić (born 1977), Serbian handballer
- Ratko Ninković (born 1967), football manager and former player from Bosnia-Herzegovina
- Ratko Perić (born 1944), the Bishop of Mostar-Duvno and Apostolic Administrator of Trebinje-Mrkan
- Ratko Radovanović (born 1956), basketball player
- Ratko Rudić (born 1948), Croatian water polo coach
- Ratko Stevović (born 1956), Montenegrin football manager
- Ratko Štritof (born 1972), Croatian water polo player
- Ratko Svilar (born 1950), former Serbian football goalkeeper
- Ratko Vansimpsen (born 1989), Belgian footballer
- Ratko Varda (born 1979), Serbian professional basketball player
- Ratko Vujović (1916–1977), Montenegrin political activist and soldier

== See also ==
- Ratko: The Dictator's Son, 2009 film
- Ratković (disambiguation)
