= Sergei Skripka =

Soviet-Ukrainian conductor (born 1949)

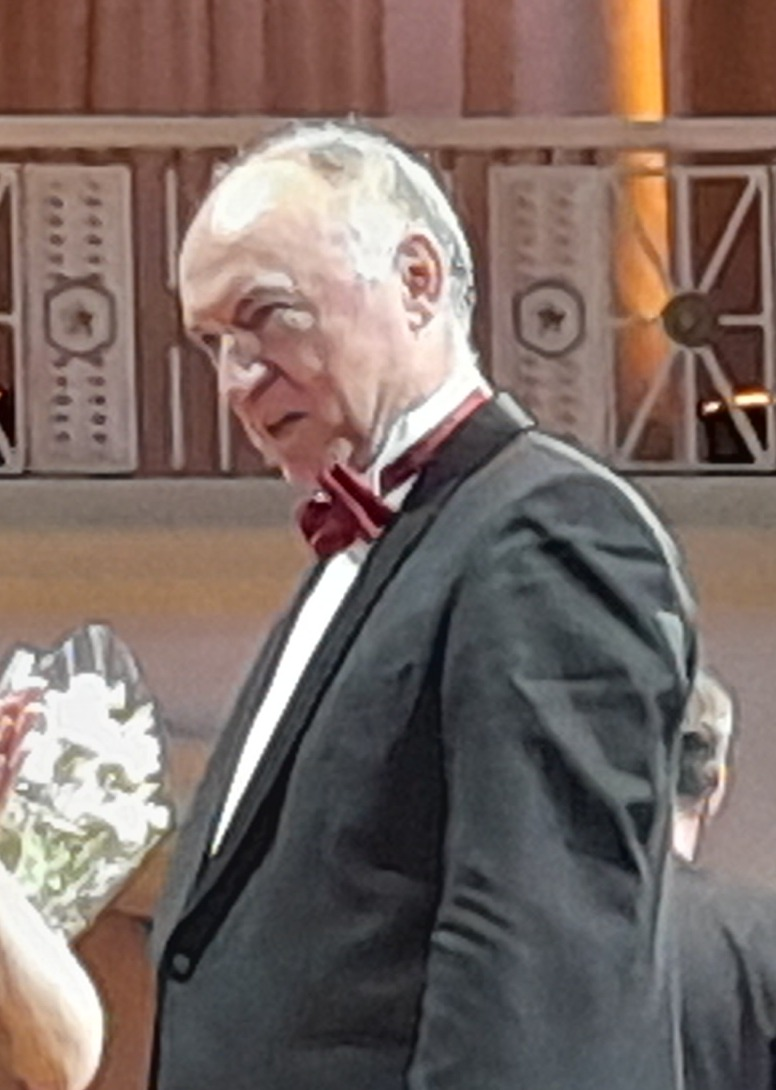
Sergei Skripka in 2023

Sergei Ivanovich Skripka (Russian: Серге́й Иванович Скрипка; October 5, 1949 in Kharkiv) is a Soviet and Ukrainian conductor, and a People's Artist of Russia, conductor of the State Symphony Cinema Orchestra.

== Early life ==
Skripka graduated in 1972 from the Kharkiv Institute of Arts as chorusmaster.

== Conductor ==
After graduating from the Conservatoire in 1979, Skripka started to work with the Russian State Symphony Orchestra of Cinematography, and since 1993 he has been their Artistic Director and Chief Conductor. Simultaneously Skripka has conducted the Zhukovsky Symphony Orchestra since 1979, with which he has toured Switzerland (in 1991) and Hungary (in 1998).

Skripka speaks both German and English which facilitates his work with foreign orchestras.
