= Bylina =

Russian epic poem

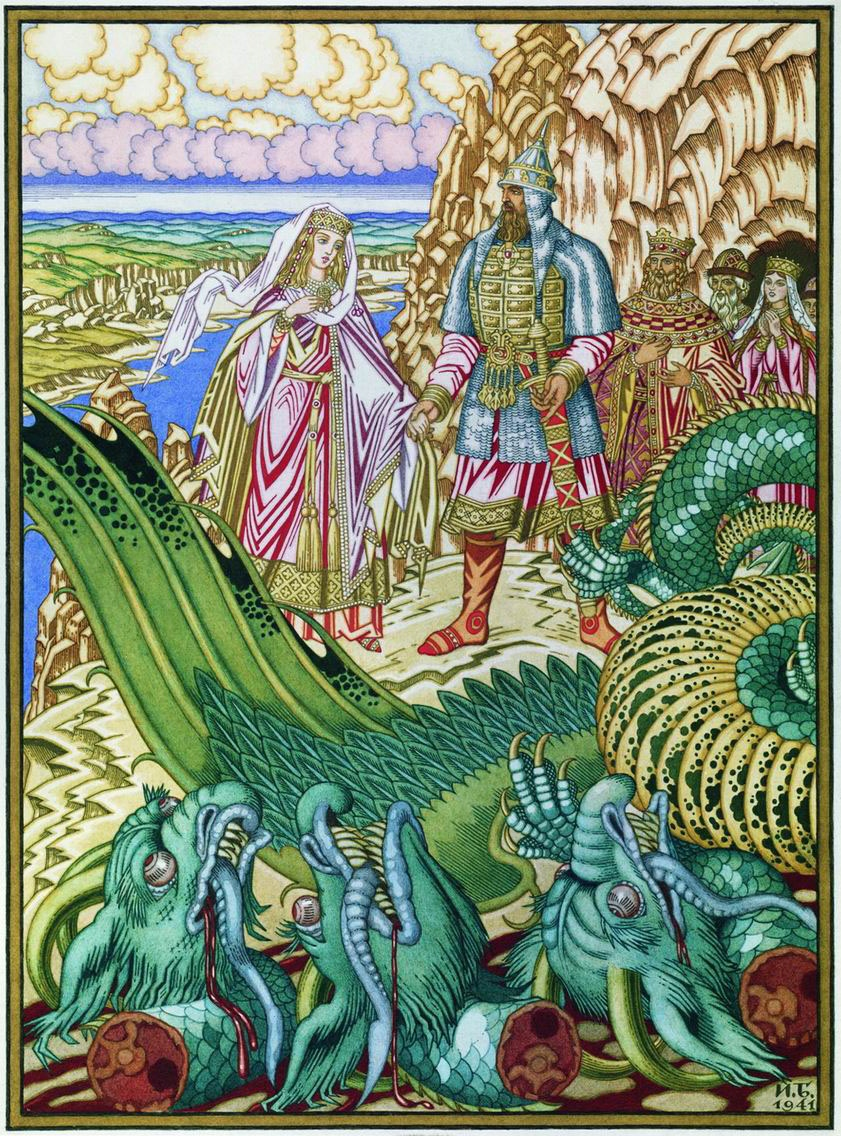
Dobrynya Nikitich rescues Zabava Putyatichna from the dragon Gorynych, by Ivan Bilibin (1941)

A bylina (Russian: былина, IPA: [bɨˈlʲinə]; pl. былины, byliny), also popularly known as a starina (Russian: старина), is a type of Russian oral epic poem.

Byliny deal with all periods of Russian history. Byliny narratives are loosely based on historical fact, but greatly embellished with fantasy or hyperbole. Byliny originate from the times of Kievan Rus', but had only survived in northern Russia by the time they were collected.

In a strict academic sense, byliny can be defined as a specific verse meter known from certain Russian sung epics, ballads and humorous songs.

== Terminology ==
The word bylina derives from the past tense of the verb "to be" (Russian: был, romanized: byl) and implies "something that was". The term most likely originated from scholars of Russian folklore (folklorists); in 1839, Ivan Sakharov, a Russian folklorist, published an anthology of Russian folklore, a section of which he titled "Byliny of the Russian People", causing the popularization of the term. Later scholars believe that Sakharov misunderstood the word bylina in the opening of The Tale of Igor's Campaign as "an ancient poem." The folk singers of byliny called their songs stariny (Russian: старины, IPA: [ˈstarʲɪnɨ]; sing. старина, starina) or starinki (Russian: старинки), meaning "stories of old" (Russian: старый, romanized: staryj).

In the 18th and early 19th centuries, scholars and popular writers typically referred to byliny as skazki, since it "applied to any folk narrative, whether in prose or in verse". At this point, skazki were not classified into specific groups. In the second half of the 19th century, Vsevolod Miller classified skazki into three groups which are now commonly accepted: fairy tales, tales of everyday life, and animal tales. The acceptance of the term byliny in the mid-19th century for folk epics was due to increasing awareness of the differences between them and the fairy tales. According to Orest Miller: "The bylina connects the primal mythical base common to all folklore genres, with historical places and events. The skazka does not have such connections."

== History ==
=== Origins ===
According to Russell Zguta, byliny originate from the times of Kievan Rus'. Zguta describes the byliny as rooted in the heroic tales sung in a stately, sober manner by the Kievan gusliari or court poets. Following Christianization, both the gusliari and the Western-inspired, much more flamboyant Kievan skomorokhi or minstrel-entertainers were pushed out of Kiev by the puritan clerics. The two groups and traditions melted into one, with the new resulting skomorokhi bards, who entertained a much lowlier public than the former court poets, embellishing the gusliari repertoire with humour and fantastic elements. They had to flee to the more permissive regions to the north and north-east, such as Novgorod and Vladimir, where their byliny survived until modern times. This is, in Zguta's opinion, the reason why this type of heroic epic disappeared from the folklore of the area it originates from, i.e. the medieval territories which would become Ukraine, instead being adopted and preserved further to the north and north-east, in the modern territories of Russia.

Alternatively, religious pilgrims or beggars known as kaliki may have brought them to northern Russia. Along with the skomorokhi, they appear as characters in byliny. As wanderers, the kaliki sung religious and other kinds of serious verses.

Other hypotheses that explain its spread in northern Russia have also been proposed. According to one theory, the Novgorodians spread the bylina to areas they colonized in the far north, as well as in the Ural region. Another theory suggests that areas where ethnic Russians were in close contact with other peoples had preserved the bylina due to the other groups having their own epic traditions, and thus the Russians were encouraged to retain their own heritage.

=== Later history ===
By the late 19th and early 20th centuries, the singing of byliny was preserved in northern Russia, particularly in the Onega, Pechora and Arkhangelsk regions. It belonged to non-professional performers and tended to be performed by poor people who needed additional work. As a result, both men and women could sing byliny. Since bylina-singing was long and required performance poetry, they were usually sung by one person. These performers typically sang at posidelki, which were courtship parties for young unmarried women.

The living tradition of byliny declined due to modernization with the increasing availability of mass media and improved communications with northern Russia. The new Soviet government viewed byliny as heroic and able to fit Soviet ideals, with government-sponsored folklorists encouraging the composition of new epics known as noviny (новины), derived from the word novyy ("new"). Although unsuccessful in creating a new oral tradition, the government brought heroes from byliny into pop culture with films such as Sadko (1953) and Ilya Muromets (1956).

== Research history ==
According to Vsevolod Miller, the prototype of the Old Russian byliny were sacred northern legends, read according to a certain "bylinic technique", passed "from generation to generation, by the teacher to the student". Regarding the time of the origin of the byliny, Leonid Maykov wrote:

All the content of byliny, including the most old traditions, is presented in such an edition, which can be dated only to the ancient historical period. The content of byliny was developed at a very early period, perhaps even before the formation of the Old Russian state.

— Leonid Maykov.

Finally, according to Orest Miller, the great antiquity of byliny is proved by the fact that they depict a defensive policy, not an offensive one.

Anthologists played an important role in the narration and preservation of byliny. After Sakharov, there were numerous other anthologists who contributed to its development, particularly during the 18th century. For example, Kirsha Danilov produced a compilation of 70 byliny. His sources were believed to be miners living in the Perm area. The works of these folklorists provided insights into the transition of the Russian literary tradition from one that was focused on religious subjects to secular literature. The first transcriptions of byliny are attributed to Richard James, an Englishman who traveled to Russia from 1617 to 1619. The texts that he was able to record are now preserved in the Bodleian Library at Oxford.

There was also a known German translation of the byliny and this was published anonymously in 1819. Overall, interest in these epic poems continued to the point that comprehensive and wide-ranging materials were sourced from virtually all of Great Russia. Although these were preserved, according to Kahn et al., only those byliny from "northern Russia, the areas of Arkhangelsk, Olonetsk, the Onega region, and parts of Siberia" were actively preserved into the 20th century.

=== Scholarly approaches ===
The advent of the mythological school began in the 1860s and was represented by Alexander Afanasyev, Fyodor Buslaev, and Orest Miller. These scholars primarily interpreted byliny through the lens of mythology, seeking to trace the origins of folklore through pre-Christian mythic traditions. Although they considered all folklore to originate from ancient religious beliefs, they did not see a direct relationship between skazki (fairy tales) and byliny; instead, the latter had emerged over time and was an evolution. As the mythologists were the first to present broad interpretations of the bylina, they distinguished between "older" and "younger heroes", and believed that the heroes were related to mythological figures like Perun.

The comparative school advanced the theory that the subjects of folklore originated from the Eastern world. Vladimir Stasov presented the theory that Russian byliny are related to the Eastern world, having been borrowed from Asia, and thus were not Russian in origin. In contrast to the mythological school, he considered the bylina to be older than the fairy tale.

By the end of the 19th century, the historical school gained prominence, with its key representative being Vsevolod Miller. As Russian chronicles contained key information about historical events and figures, Miller considered it important for folklorists to search these chronicles for specific names and events that may have inspired the creation of a particular bylina. The hero Dobrynya Nikitich for example was identified with Dobrynya, the uncle of Vladimir the Great.

== Collections ==
Byliny have been collected in Russia since the 17th century; initially they were published for entertainment in prose paraphrases. The Cossack Kirsha Danilov compiled the most notable of the early collections in the Ural region for the mill owner Prokofi Demidov in the middle of the 18th century. In the middle of the 19th century, Pavel Rybnikov traveled through the region of Lake Onega and rediscovered that the bylina tradition, which was thought to be extinct, still flourished among the peasants of northwest Russia. A storm stranded Rybnikov on an island in Lake Onega where he heard the sound of a bylina being sung; he persuaded the singer to repeat the song and wrote down his words. He proceeded to collect several hundred bylina, all of which he recorded from spoken paraphrase, and published them from 1861 to 1867 in several volumes entitled Songs Collected by P. N. Rybnikov.

Another influential collector, Alexander Gilferding, published one collection entitled Onega Bylinas Recorded by A. F. Gilferding in the Summer of 1871. He improved upon Rybnikov's work by transcribing the byliny directly from the sung performance rather than the spoken retellings. He noticed that the rhythm differed between the sung and spoken versions, and asked the performers to pause for a longer period of time between lines to allow him time to record the words from the song itself. He also organized his collection by singer rather than subject and included short biographical sketches of the performers with their collected songs, thus focusing on the singer's role in the composition of the song. Most of the texts are byliny, but Yermak Timofeyevich and Stenka Razin were also mentioned in the songs. Following the work of Rybnikov and Gilferding, many more scholars searched for byliny everywhere in northern Russia, and obtained byliny from the shores of the White Sea and the rivers flowing to the north.

== Classifications ==
There are several ways to categorize byliny, and scholars disagree on which classification to use. Scholars from the mythological school differentiate between byliny about "older" and "younger" heroes. The "older" heroes resembled mythological figures, while the "younger" heroes resembled ordinary human beings. The historical school classifies byliny based on the principality in which the story took place, as in Kievan, Novgorodian, and Galician–Volhynian cycles. The mythological byliny of giants and the like probably originated long before the Kievan state was founded, and cannot be classified easily by principality. Scholars of the historical school often consider mythological byliny separately. Other scholars group byliny based on content, including heroic, fairy tale type, novella type and ballad-byliny. Most scholars prefer classification based on principalities or cities.

=== Bylina cycles ===
Mythological byliny, the group considered to be the oldest, cannot be linked to datable events. These are followed by the Kievan cycle of byliny and are usually centered on Prince Vladimir; the Kievan cycle includes the most well-known heroes, such as Ilya Muromets, Dobrynya Nikitich and Alyosha Popovich. The Galician cycle is sometimes considered to be separate to the Kievan cycle and includes heroes such as Duke Stepanovich and Churilo Plenkovich. The Novgorodian cycle is considered to be the newest cycle; rather than tsars or princes, merchants like Vasily Buslayev and Sadko are often present.

== Structure ==
Because of their nature as performed pieces, byliny singers employ basically linear and easy to follow structure. Byliny structure typically includes three basic parts, introduction, narrative portion and epilogue. The introduction sometimes includes a verse to entice the audience to listen. Introductions often describe heroes at a feast being given a task or setting out on a mission. The narrative portion relates the adventure with exaggerated details and hyperbole to make the story more exciting. The epilogue refers to the reward for the mission, a moral or a reference to the sea, since byliny were often performed to attempt to calm the sea. To help listeners grasp the story, singers used 'tag lines' to preface speeches or dialogues, setting up for the audience who is talking to whom.

== Common themes ==
Scenes common to byliny include a hero taking leave of his mother, saddling a horse, entering a council chamber, bragging, departing over the wall of a city, going on a journey, urging on his horse, in battle, dressing in the morning, exchanging taunts with an enemy, becoming blood brothers with another hero, and asking for mercy. Singers may use their telling of these scenes in many of their songs, incorporating different elements in song after song. Themes in many bylina include the birth and childhood of a hero, father and son fighting, battling a monster, the imprisoned or reluctant hero returning in time to save his city, matchmaking or bride taking, a husband arriving at the wedding of his wife, and encounters with a sorceress who turns men into animals. Christian beliefs mixed with pre-Christian ideas of magic and paganism in byliny, for instance, saints would appear to defend mortals against darkness.

== Major characters and prototypes ==
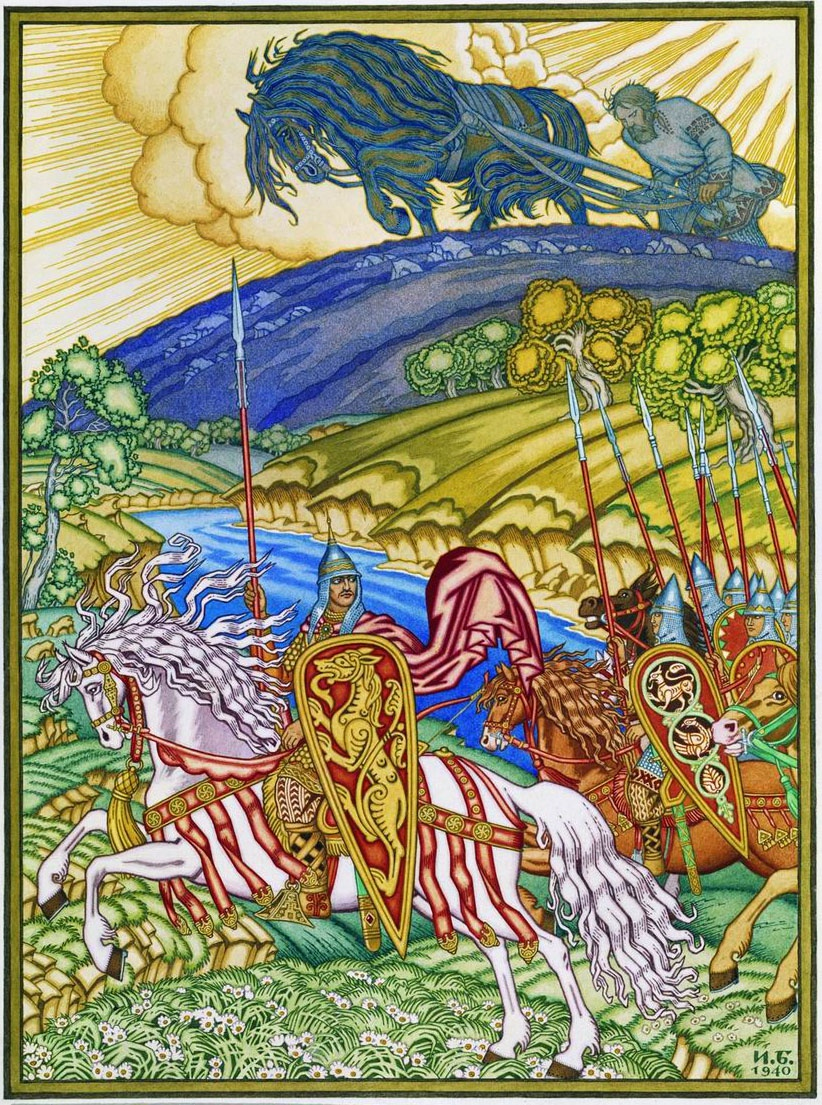
Mikula Selyaninovich and Volga Svyatoslavich with his druzhina, by Ivan Bilibin (1940)

Major bylina characters are Russian epic heroes known as bogatyrs.

Russian name	English name	Prototype
Илья Муромец	Ilya Muromets	Saint Ilya Pechersky, monk of Kiev Pechersk Lavra
Добрыня Никитич	Dobrynya Nikitich	Dobrynya, Kievan voivode.
Алёша Попович	Alyosha Popovich	Rostov boyar Alexander (Olesha) Popovich.
Святогор	Svyatogor	East Slavic pre-Christian folk tales.
Микула Селянинович	Mikula Selyaninovich	Personification of the Russian peasants.
Князь Владимир	Prince Vladimir	Vladimir the Great
Вольга Святославич	Volga Svyatoslavich	Prince Oleg
Евпатий Коловрат	Evpaty Kolovrat	Ryazan nobleman with the same name.
Садко	Sadko	
Никита-кожемяка	Nikita the Tanner	
Василий Буслаев	Vasily Buslayev	
Дюк Степанович	Duke Stepanovich	
Змей Горыныч	Zmey Gorynych	Slavic variation of the European dragon.
Солове́й-Разбо́йник	Nightingale the Robber	

== Sources ==
- "Былины" . Brockhaus and Efron Encyclopedic Dictionary (in Russian). 1906.
- Alexander, Alex E. (1973). Bylina and Fairy Tale: The Origins of Russian Heroic Poetry. The Hague; Paris: Mouton & Co.
- Bailey, James; Ivanova, Tatyana (1998). An Anthology of Russian Folk Epics. Armonk, NY: M. E. Sharpe. p. xx.
- Honko, Lauri (2011). Textualization of Oral Epics. Walter de Gruyter. p. 318. ISBN 978-3-11-082584-8.
- Kononenko, Natalie (11 April 2025). "Byliny: Russian Folk Epic". In Beissinger, Margaret H. (ed.). The Oxford Handbook of Slavic and East European Folklore. Oxford University Press. ISBN 978-0-19-008077-8.
- Oinas, Felix J. (1978). "Russian Byliny". Heroic Epic and Saga: an Introduction to the World's Great Folk Epics. Bloomington: Indiana University Press.
- Warner, Elizabeth (2002). Russian Myths (1st ed.). Austin: University of Texas Press. ISBN 978-0292791589.
- Zguta, Russell (1972). "Kievan 'Byliny': Their Enigmatic Disappearance from Kievan Territory". Journal of the Folklore Institute. 9 (2/3 (Aug. – Dec., 1972)). Indiana University Press: 185–193. doi:10.2307/3814165. JSTOR 3814165.
