= Pavel Rybnikov =

Pavel Nikolayevich Rybnikov
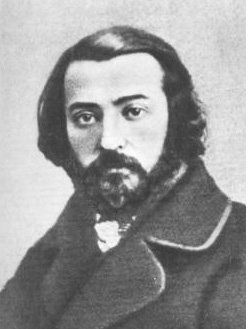
- Born: Павел Николаевич Рыбников; 6 December 1831; Moscow, Russian Empire
- Died: 29 November 1885 (aged 53); Kalisz, Poland
- Occupations: ethnographer, folklorist, historian
- Awards: The Demidov Prize (1864)

Pavel Nikolayevich Rybnikov (Па́вел Никола́евич Ры́бников, 6 December 1831, Moscow, Russian Empire, – 29 November 1885, Kalisz, Poland, then part of the Russian Empire) was a Russian ethnographer, folklorist and literary historian, credited with the discovery of the previously unknown culture of bylina and epos poetry of the Olonets and Arkhangelsk regions of North-European Russia. He spent the second half of his life in Kalisz, where he was the vice-governor of the Kalisz Guberniya, and contributed to the development of local science and culture.

== Biography ==
Pavel Nikolayevich Rybnikov was born in Moscow to a family of staroobryadtsy merchants. After graduating from 3rd Moscow Gymnasium with a silver medal in 1850, he enrolled into Moscow University's History and Philology faculty. It was at that time that he got close to the Moscow Slavophiles' circle, notably Aleksey Khomyakov and Konstantin Aksakov.

In 1859, Rybnikov was arrested in Chernigov for contacts with the local Old Believers community (where he went to study the local history and literature, on Khomyakov's recommendation). Rybnikov was pronounced "a revolutionary", a fact scathingly commented upon by Alexander Hertzen in Kolokol) and deported to Petrozavodsk. There he started the extensive study of the Northern Russia's folklore, culture and history.

The Songs Collected by P.N.Rybnikov, published in 4 volumes in 1861—1867 made Rybnikov a well-known author both in Russia and abroad. After Rybnikov was granted two major awards - the Russian Geographical Society's Gold medal and the Demidov Prize, both in 1864, the Russian authorities were motivated to 'pardon' Rybnikov. Relieved of the status of an 'exile' and granted the permission to move to either of Russia's major cities, Rybnikov instead married a Polish woman and settled in the city of Kalisz where he remained until his death.

After the recreation of the Kalisz Guberniya in 1857 Rybnikov was appointed to the position of vice-governor of the Guberniya. He supported the creation of the regional newspaper, Kaliszanin, and was its censor for sixteen years. Despite being a Russian official administering a territory in a Russian partition, he is remembered in Poland as especially sympathetic towards the Polish people and Polish culture.
