= Svyatogor =

Russian mythical hero

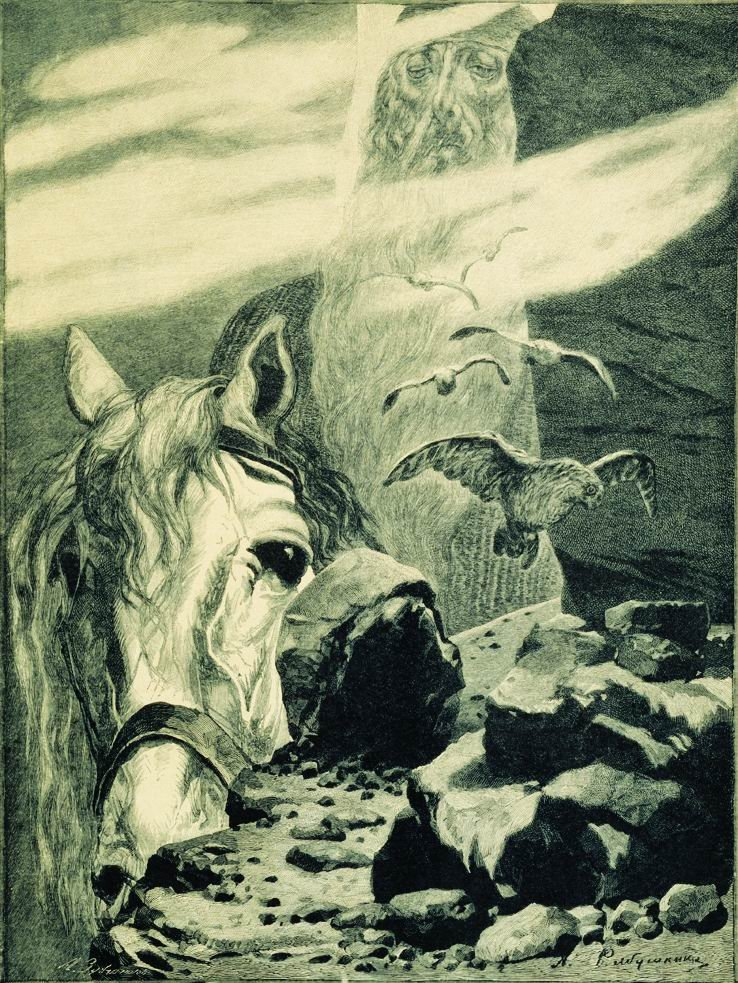
Svyatogor by Andrei Ryabushkin, 1895

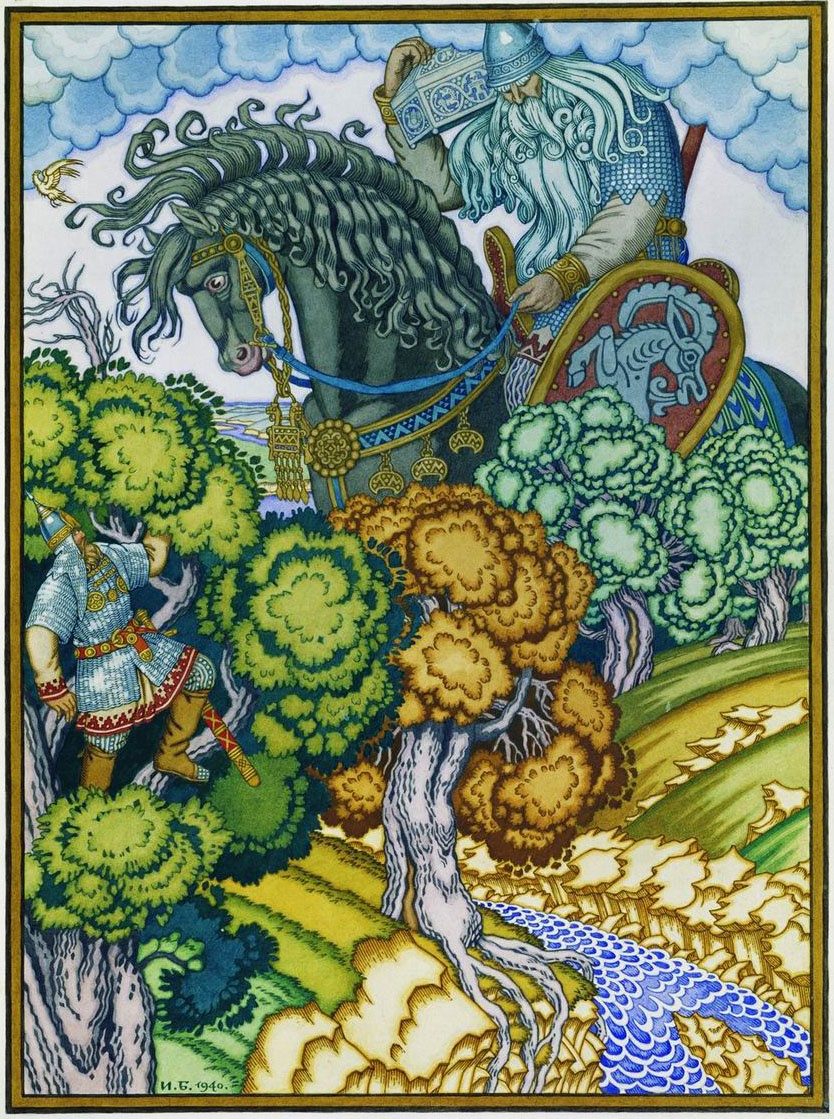
Ilya Muromets and Svyatogor by Ivan Bilibin, 1940

Svyatogor or Sviatogor (Russian: Святого́р, IPA: [svʲɪtɐˈɡor]) is a mythical bogatyr (knight-errant) in Russian byliny (oral epic poems). His name derives from the words for "sacred mountain".

== Description ==
Svyatogor's tale, Ilya Muromets and Svyatogor, forms a part of the Ilya Muromets cycle. According to the epic, Mother Earth cannot support the weight of Svyatogor, but he cannot overcome the "pull of the earth" contained in a bag provided by Mikula Selyaninovich; when he tries to lift the bag, his feet sink into the ground. Svyatogor's father is "dark" and is blind, which is a sign of coming from another world.

After becoming a bogatyr of knyaz (prince) Vladimir the Bright Sun, Ilya Muromets rides off to challenge Svyatogor, despite being forewarned not to do so by pilgrims (who had miraculously healed him). On the road, Ilya Muromets sees a giant asleep on a giant horse. Ilya strikes him three times with his mace, with the only result that the giant, still asleep, grabs Ilya and puts him into his pocket. Eventually, the giant awakes, Ilya introduces himself and learns that the giant is Svyatogor; they become friends and journey together. They arrive at a giant, stone coffin, and both have a premonition that it is for Svyatogor. Ilya manages to lie down in the coffin first — it appears too large for him, but it fits Svyatogor perfectly. When Svyatogor closes the lid, it seals the coffin. Before the lid seals completely, Svyatogor passes part of his strength to Ilya through his breath.

== In popular culture ==
- Vasily Slesarev's aircraft, the Slesarev Svyatogor, was named after the mythical bogatyr.
- Svyatogor was the first name of the icebreaker Krasin.
- Svyatogor appears in the 1956 live action Soviet film Ilya Muromets.
- Svyatogor appears in the animated film Alyosha Popovich and Tugarin Zmey (2004) of Three Bogatyrs trilogy, voiced by Ivan Krasko.
- A Czech stop motion animation version of this was made and became part of WGBH Boston's anthology series, Long Ago and Far Away.
- In the first-person shooter game Overwatch, several mechanical warriors (Mechs) called Svyatogor appear in the background of the Volskaya Industries map, used by the Russian Army for defense.

== Sources ==
- Dixon-Kennedy, Mike (8 December 1998). "Sviatogor". Encyclopedia of Russian and Slavic Myth and Legend. Bloomsbury Academic. pp. 272–274. ISBN 978-1-57607-063-5.
