= Vasily Buslayev =

Character in Russian folklore

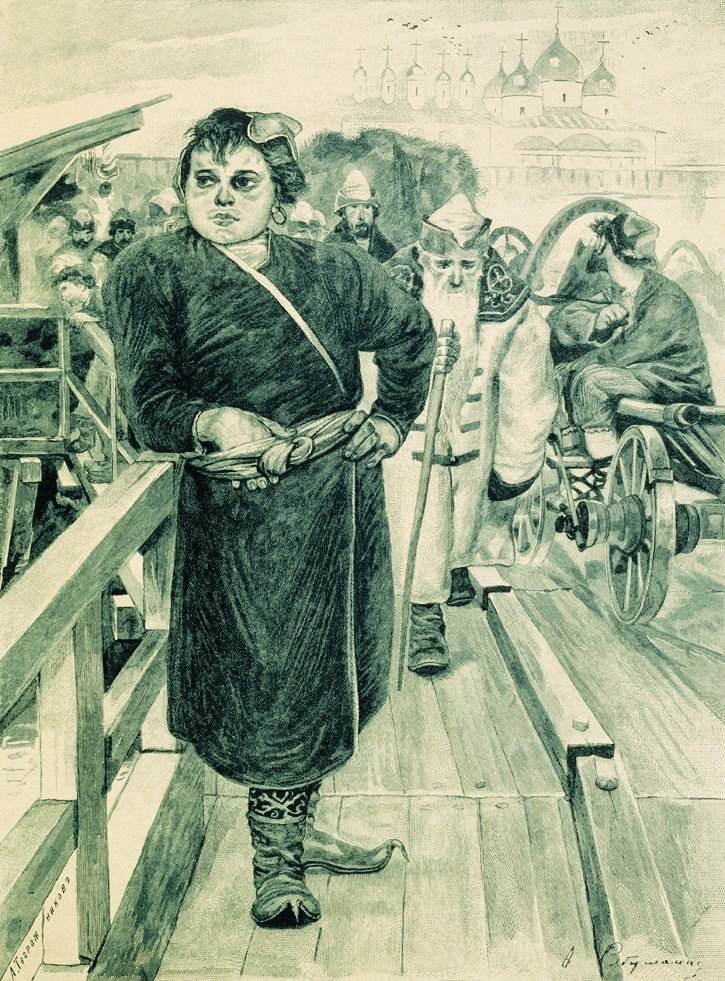
Vasily Buslayev

Vasily Buslayev (Russian: Василий Буслаев) is a hero appearing in the Novgorod cycle of Russian byliny (oral epic poems).

According to S.A. Azbelev there are 53 bogatyr epics, Vasily is the protagonist of three, numbers 40, 41 and 42: "Vasily Buslayev and the People of Novgorod", "Vasily Buslayev's Journey" and "The Death of Vasily Buslayev".

== Image ==
Vasily Buslayev is a Novgorod hero, representing the ideal of youthful and boundless prowess. He is one of the most famous characters of folklore, bearing the name Vasily.

From a young age Vasily showed no constraint; he always did as he pleased, without regard to consequences. Antagonizing the majority of Novgorod, he gathered a group of like minded daredevils to rage more and more. Only his mother had a slight power over him. Finally at a feast Vasily became drunk and belligerent and bet that he and his group could beat up all of the men of Novgorod. As the fight began, it quickly became clear that Vasily's wager was to be seen through. Only his mother's intervention was able to save the men of Novgorod.

Later, when Vasily was older, feeling the weight of his sins, he made a pilgrimage to Jerusalem to repent. However, the journey did not change his character and he defiantly violated all prohibitions and died on his return in the most absurd way trying once again to prove his prowess.

Most pre-revolution researchers are in favor that Vasily was intended to represent the might of Novgorod and its people.

== In media ==
- Vasiliy Buslaev (1983), film directed by Gennadiy Vasilev, based on a poem by Sergei Narovchatov
- As a supporting character in the film Alexander Nevsky (1938) directed by Sergei Eisenstein.
- James Joyce makes a coded allusion to this bogatyr in Finnegans Wake: "Of the first was he to bare arms and a name: Wassaily Booslaeugh of Riesengeborg."
