= Orest Miller =

Russian folklorist of Baltic German origin (1833–1889)

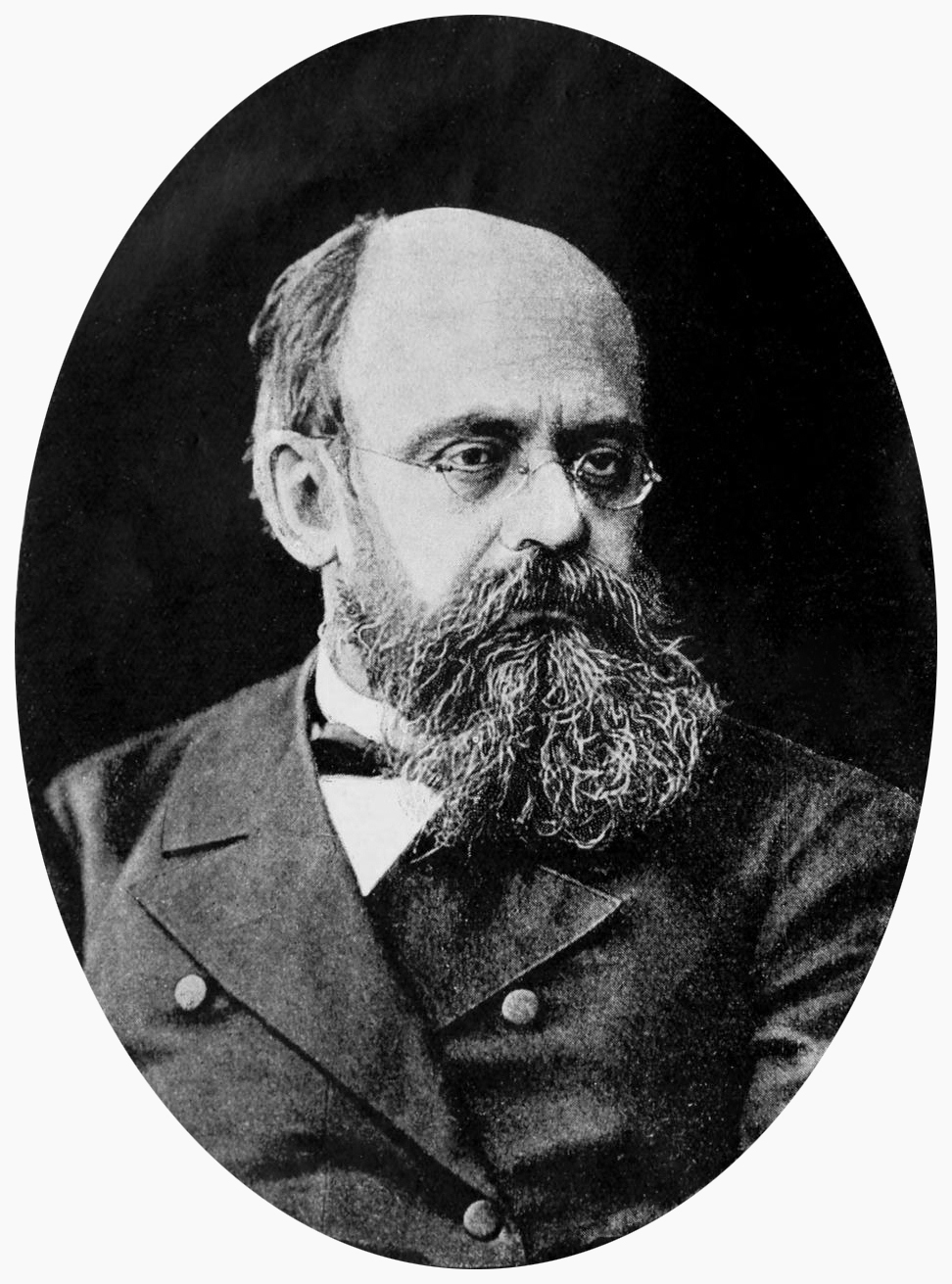
- Born: 4 August 1833; Haapsalu, Governorate of Estonia, Russian Empire
- Died: 1 June 1889 (aged 55); St Petersburg, Russian Empire

Signature
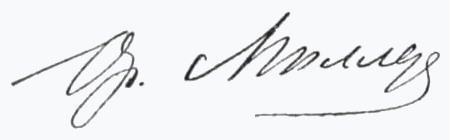

Orest Fyodorovich Miller (Russian: Оре́ст Фёдорович Ми́ллер; 4 August 1833 – 1 June 1889) was a Russian folklorist and professor in Russian literature. He was of Baltic German origin and from Estonia. He is the author of the book "Илья Муромец и богатырство киевское" ("Ilya Muromets and the Kievan bogatyrs").

== Sources ==
- "Миллер, Орест Федорович" . Brockhaus and Efron Encyclopedic Dictionary (in Russian). 1906.
