= Ratković, Serbia =

Ratković
- Village
- Location within Serbia
- Coordinates: 43°54′46″N 21°02′11″E
- Country: Serbia
- District: Pomoravlje District
- Municipality: Rekovac

Population (2002)
  - Total: 461
- Time zone: UTC+1 (CET)
  - Summer (DST): UTC+2 (CEST)

Ratković is a village in the municipality of Rekovac, Serbia. According to the 2023 census, the village has a population of 463 people.
