= Ratkovići, Kreševo =

Village in Central Bosnia

Ratkovići
- Village
- Location within Bosnia and Herzegovina
- Coordinates: 43.8987884°N 18.0070437°E
- Country: Bosnia and Herzegovina
- Entity: Federation of Bosnia and Herzegovina
- Canton: Central Bosnia
- Municipality: Kreševo

Area
  - Total: 0.64 sq mi (1.66 km^{2})

Population (2013)
  - Total: 48
  - Density: 75/sq mi (29/km^{2})
- Time zone: UTC+1 (CET)
  - Summer (DST): UTC+2 (CEST)

Ratkovići is a village in the municipality of Kreševo, Bosnia and Herzegovina.

== Demographics ==
According to the 2013 census, its population was 48.

Ethnicity in 2013
Ethnicity	Number	Percentage
Croats	37	77.1%
Bosniaks	11	22.9%
Total	48	100%
