= Russell Zguta =

American historian of East Slavic culture

Russell Zguta (born October 3, 1949) is an American historian, educator, and professor emeritus at the University of Missouri.

== Early life and education ==
He received his bachelor's degrees in history from Saint Francis University in 1964, and his masters (1965) and doctorate (1967) from Pennsylvania State University.

== Career ==
Zguta's research has focused on the medieval and early modern cultural history of the East Slavs, including the Belarusians, Russians, and Ukrainians.

In 1979, Choice magazine included his book Russian Minstrels: A History of the Skomorokhi (1978) in its Outstanding Academic Books list for that year. His other publications include "Witchcraft Trials in Seventeenth-Century Russia" in The American Historical Review (1977); "The One-Day Votive Church: A Religious Response to the Black Death in Early Russia" in Slavic Review (1981); and the "Monastic Medicine in Kievan Rus' and Early Muscovy" chapter in Medieval Russian Culture (1984).

While at the University of Missouri, Zguta chaired multiple departments: History (1989-1991 and 2010–2013), Economics (1991–1995), and Romance Literature (2005–2008). In 1990, he received the university's Purple Chalk Award (where the winner is chosen by a student vote) "for exemplary teaching and advising".

In October 2016, the Central Slavic Conference, a regional affiliate of ASEEES, presented Zguta with its presidential award for "his lifetime of support of the Central Slavic Conference and untiring promotion of Slavic studies".

== Articles ==
- Zguta, Russell. “Skomorokhi: The Russian Minstrel-Entertainers.” Slavic Review 31, no. 2 (1972): 297–313.
- Zguta, Russell. “Witchcraft Trials in Seventeenth-Century Russia.” The American Historical Review 82, no. 5 (1977): 1187–1207.
