= Ratimir =

Ratimir (Serbian Cyrillic: Ратимир) or Ratmir (Russian: Ратмир) or Racimir (Polish), is a Slavic origin given name meaning "defender of peace". In Serbian the diminutive of Ratimir is Ratko.

Notable people with the name include:

- Ratimir, Duke of Lower Pannonia
- Ratomir Dujković, a Serbian football manager and a former player
- Ratimir Martinović, Montenegrin pianist
- Ratmir Kholmov, a Russian chess Grandmaster
- Ratmir Shameyev (1988–2011), rebel leader in the North Caucasus insurgency
- Ratmir Timashev (born 1966), Russian IT entrepreneur
- Ratmir, character in Pushkin's poem Ruslan and Ludmila
