= State Symphony Cinema Orchestra =

Russian symphony orchestra

The Russian State Symphony Cinema Orchestra (Russian: Российский государственный симфонический оркестр кинематографии) is an orchestra under the control of the Ministry of Culture Symphony Orchestra, performing musical compositions for use in movies and other media. Founded in November 1924, until 1991 it was known as the State Symphony Orchestra of Cinematography at the Council of Ministers of the USSR (Russian: Государственный симфонический оркестр кинематографии при Совете Министров СССР).

== History ==
The orchestra was unofficially founded in November 1924 at the Moscow cinema "Ars", located on Arbat Street.

In 1924 in Ars for the first time the place of the usual for that time pianist took an orchestra. Such a change in the musical accompaniment of films became popular among the spectators. Since then, under the direction of conductor David Blok, the orchestra began to play in other theatres.

In 1930–1940's orchestra performed music for films such directors as Sergei Eisenstein, Vsevolod Pudovkin, Grigori Aleksandrov and Ivan Pyryev. Among the later films, musical party which served the orchestra – movies, The awarded "Oscar" ("War and Peace", "Dersu Uzala", "Burnt by the Sun", "Moscow Does Not Believe in Tears"), as well as modern Russian films ("Doctor Zhivago", "Miracle", "Ward No. 6", "Pete on the Way to Heaven", "Tsar", "12", "Admiral").

At various times over the conductor's stand were: Alexander Gauk, Svetlanov, Yuri Nikolaev, Mark Ermler, Krimets Constantine, Georgy Garanian.

In the years 1953–1963 the artistic director and director of the orchestra was Levon Atovmyan. From 1993 the chief conductor and artistic director of the orchestra is Sergei Skripka, People's Artist of Russia, laureate of the State Prize of the Russian Federation in the field of culture.

== Notable conductors ==
- Emin Khachaturian
- Sergei Skripka
