= Ratkovići, Čelić =

Ratkovići
- Village
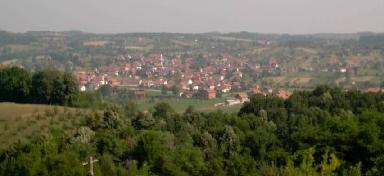

- Location within Bosnia and Herzegovina
- Coordinates: 44.7420362°N 18.7822865°E
- Country: Bosnia and Herzegovina
- Entity: Federation of Bosnia and Herzegovina
- Region Canton: Bijeljina; Tuzla
- Municipality: Čelić

Area
  - Total: 1.75 sq mi (4.53 km^{2})

Population (2013)
  - Total: 1,106
  - Density: 632/sq mi (244/km^{2})
- Time zone: UTC+1 (CET)
  - Summer (DST): UTC+2 (CEST)

Ratkovići is a village in the municipality of Čelić, Tuzla Canton, Bosnia and Herzegovina.

== Demographics ==
According to the 2013 census, its population was 1,106, with only 5 of them living in the Lopare part, and 1,101 in Čelić.

Ethnicity in 2013
Ethnicity	Number	Percentage
Bosniaks	1,087	98.3%
Serbs	5	0.5%
other/undeclared	14	1.3%
Total	1,106	100%
