= Slesarev Svyatogor =

Russian large experimental aircraft, 1913

Svyatogor
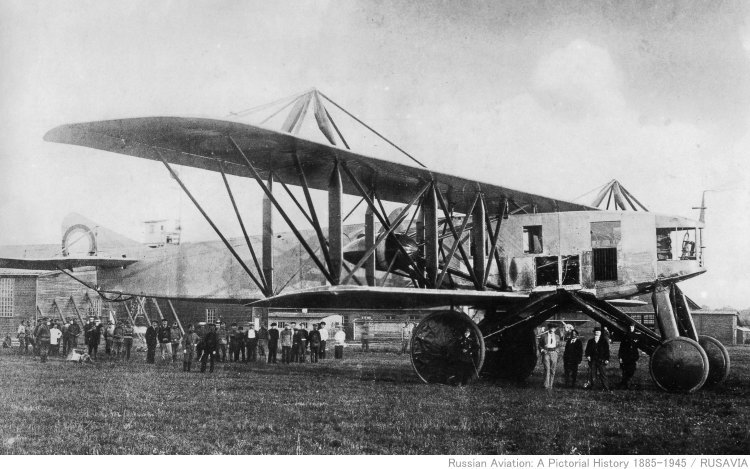
- Svyatogor

General information
- Type: Experimental bomber
- Designer: V.A. Slesarev
- Status: scrapped
- Number built: 1

History
- First flight: never flown

The Svyatogor (Russian: Святого́р) was a large experimental Russian aircraft, constructed by Vasily Slesarev in 1916. The aircraft was named after the mythological hero Svyatogor.

== Development ==
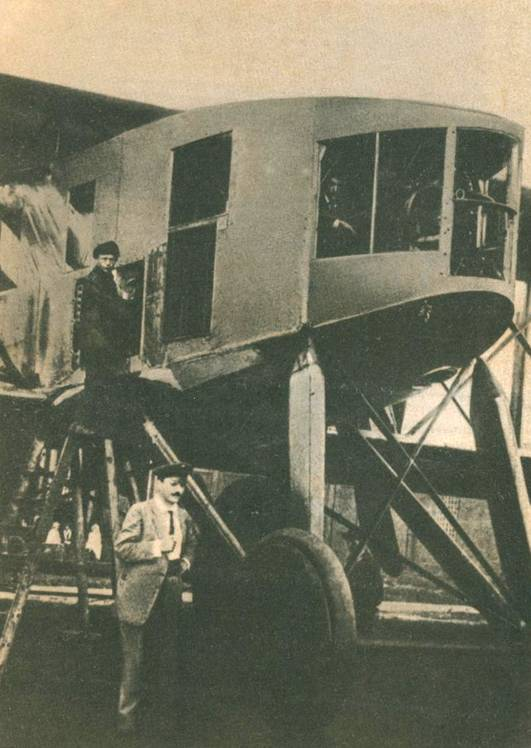
Cabin of the Svyatogor

The work on the Svyatogor began in 1913. It was a large wooden biplane, with wings and fuselage covered in fabric. The aircraft was propelled by two large propellers, 6 meters in diameter. Everything on the aircraft was oversized, the nose wheel was 1.5 meter in diameter and the four rear wheels were 2 meters in diameter. The engines were placed inside the fuselage to allow access during flight.

The aircraft awoke much interest, but failed to receive funding before World War I. In desperate need of aircraft, the project was given a 100,000 rubles funding by E.M. Malynsky and production started in December 1914.

As suitable engines were hard to come by, Slesarev tried to mount some that had been taken from a downed Zeppelin. He contacted the French when this did not work out, and received some Renault engines, which could produce 220 hp. These arrived in January 1916. Despite being without money, the construction of the revised design continued. The project stalled, however, with the transmission problems and the death of Slesarev in 1921. The Slesarev Svyatogor never flew.

== Specifications ==
General characteristics

- Crew: 3
- Length: 21.0 m (68 ft 11 in)
- Wingspan: 36.0 m (118 ft 1 in)
- Wing area: 180 m^{2} (1,938 sq ft)
- Empty weight: 3,200 kg (7,055 lb)
- Max takeoff weight: 6,500 kg (14,330 lb)
- Powerplant: 2 × Renault piston engine, 149 kW (200 hp) each

Performance

- Maximum speed: 100 km/h (62 mph, 54 kn)
- Endurance: 30 h
- Service ceiling: 2,500 m (8,200 ft)
