= Emin Khachaturian =

Armenian conductor and composer

- Born: Emin Levonovich Khachaturian; 5 August 1930; Yerevan, Armenia
- Died: 5 August 2000 (aged 70)
- Education: Moscow Conservatory
- Occupations: conductor, composer
- Years active: 1957–2000
- Known for: Moscow Region Symphony, Bolshoi Theatre orchestra, Cinematographical State Symphony, Armenian Radio Symphony, Yerevan Chamber Orchestra
- Father: Lewon Khachaturian (singer)
- Relatives: Aram Khachaturian (nephew)

Emin Levonovich Khachaturian (5 August 1930 – 5 August 2000) was an Armenian conductor and composer, who was active mainly in Moscow through the 1960s and 1970s and in Yerevan in later years. He was named a People's Artist of the Russian SFSR in 1975.

== Life ==
Khachaturian was born on 5 August 1930 in Yerevan, Armenia, the son of singer Lewon Khachaturian and nephew of Aram Khachaturian.

He died on 5 August 2000.

== Career ==
After graduating from the Moscow Conservatory under Alexander Gauk he started his conducting career with Moscow Region Symphony in 1957. In 1960 he was appointed lead conductor of the Orchestra of the Bolshoi Theatre, and he moved the following year to the Cinematographical State Symphony, which he led until 1979. From 1986 until his death in 2000, he led the Armenian Radio Symphony and the Yerevan Chamber Orchestra. He was also active in Yerevan as a professor in the national conservatory.

== Film ==
Conductor for the following films unless otherwise noted.

- Ivan's Childhood (1962)
- Welcome, or No Trespassing (1964)
- Commissar (film) (1967)
- The Brothers Karamazov (1969)
- Office Romance (1977)
- Stalker (1979)
- The Hound of the Baskervilles (1981)
- Teheran 43 (1981)

== Personal ==
He created and led the Aram Khachaturian Association with his niece Leily until his death.

== Premieres ==
Date	Venue	Composer	Composition	Soloist(s)	Orchestra
1957	Moscow	Sofia Gubaidulina	Phacelia	Tamara Petrova	?
