= Mikula Selyaninovich =

Russian mythical hero

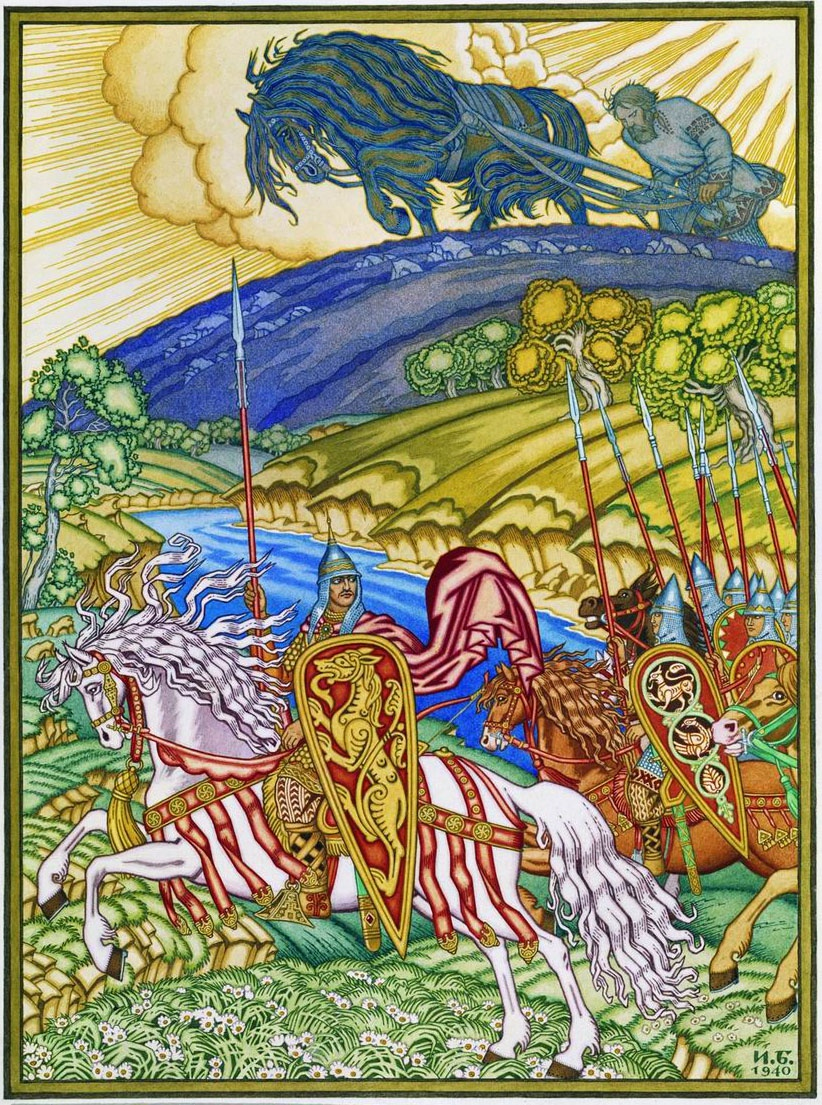
Bogatyr Volga Svyatoslavich and Mikula Selyaninovich, by Ivan Bilibin

Mikula Selyaninovich (Russian: Микула Селянинович, Mikula the Villager's Son) is a Russian epic hero, a bogatyr - plowman, from the Novgorod Republic bylina cycle.

A common plot trope in bylinas involving Mikula is that another bogatyr of warrior type turns out to be weaker than Mikula: cannot pull his plow out of the soil, cannot lift his bag, cannot race him, etc., because Mother Earth loves him.

== Sources ==
- "Микула Селянинович" . Brockhaus and Efron Encyclopedic Dictionary (in Russian). 1906.
