= Andrei Ryabushkin =

Russian painter

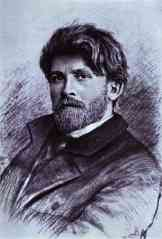
Andrei Ryabushkin by Vasily Mathe

Andrei Petrovich Ryabushkin (Russian: Андре́й Петро́вич Ря́бушкин; 29 October [O.S. 17 October] 1861 – 10 May [O.S. 27 April] 1904) was a Russian painter. His major works were devoted to life of ordinary Russians of the 17th century.

== Biography ==
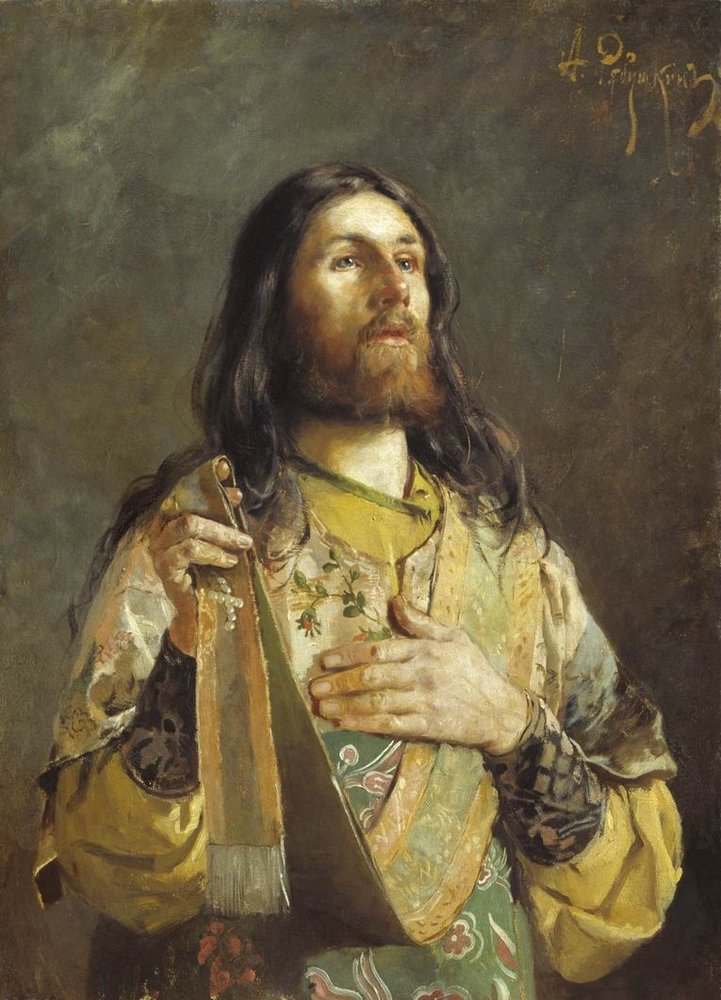
The Deacon

Andrey Petrovich Ryabushkin was born in the village Stanichnaya sloboda, Borisoglebskiy uezd, Tambov gubernia in 1861. His father and brother were icon painters, and he started to help them from his early childhood. At 14 years old he became an orphan. A student of Moscow School of Painting, Sculpture and Architecture A. Kh. Preobrazhensky, who spent the summer in the village, happened to see the boy’s drawings and was greatly impressed by them. He started to give him lessons and helped him enter the Moscow School of Painting, Sculpture and Architecture. Ryabushkin was one of the youngest student of the school at all times.

Ryabushkin stayed for seven years (1875–82) in the Moscow School, learning from Vasily Perov and Illarion Pryanishnikov. His first large work Peasant Wedding was bought by Pavel Tretyakov in 1880. After the death of Vasiliy Perov, Ryabushkin moved to Saint Petersburg in 1882, and entered the Imperial Academy of Arts where he learned from Pavel Chistyakov. The classes soon disappointed him, however, and he began to spend more and more time either in the library of the academy or sketching in the streets.

His studies at the academy came to an end in 1892. He did not receive an award for his diploma work, Descent from the Cross, as was expected, because he did not follow the approved project. But the work was so good that the president of the academy, Grand Duke Vladimir Alexandrovich, provided Ryabushkin with a stipend for travel and studies abroad from his own means. Instead of going to Italy or Paris, Ryabushkin chose to make a tour of ancient Russian towns (Novgorod, Kiev, Moscow, Uglich, Yaroslavl). The inhabitants of them became his first models and his first critics. He studied the old architecture, items of folk crafts, old weapons, fabrics, tapestries, embroidery, icons, etc. He read ancient books, collected folklore.

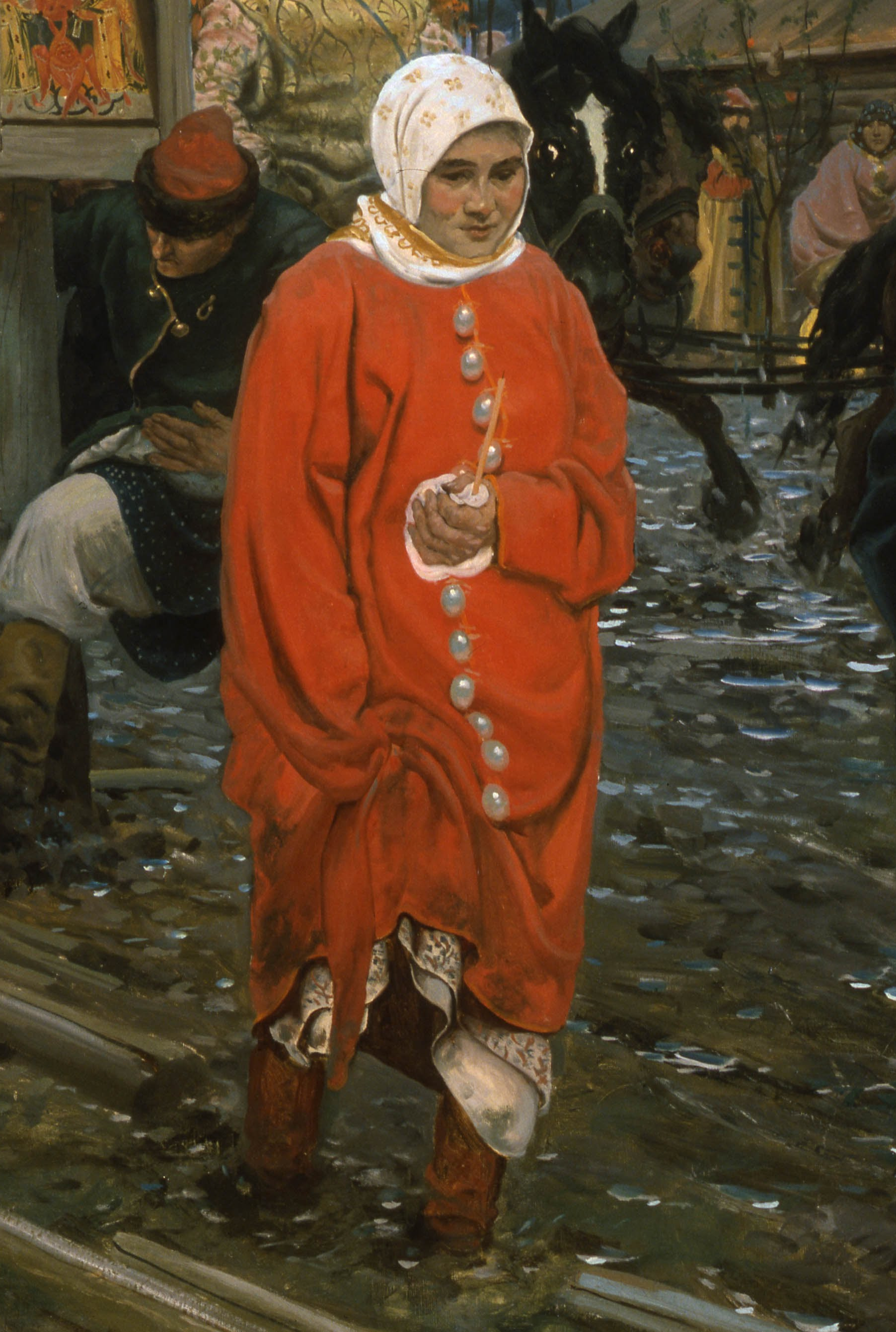
Detail of Московская улица XVII века в праздничный день Seventeenth-Century Moscow Street on a Public Holiday 1895.

He took part in Peredvizhniki exhibitions in 1890, 1892 and 1894 but later broke with the movement.

In the 1890s he lived and worked in the estate of his friend V.F. Tymenev in town of Lyuban (Novgorod gubernia, now Leningrad oblast). In 1901 he built a studio in a village of Didvino close to Lubvino and the estate of his friend I. Belyaev.

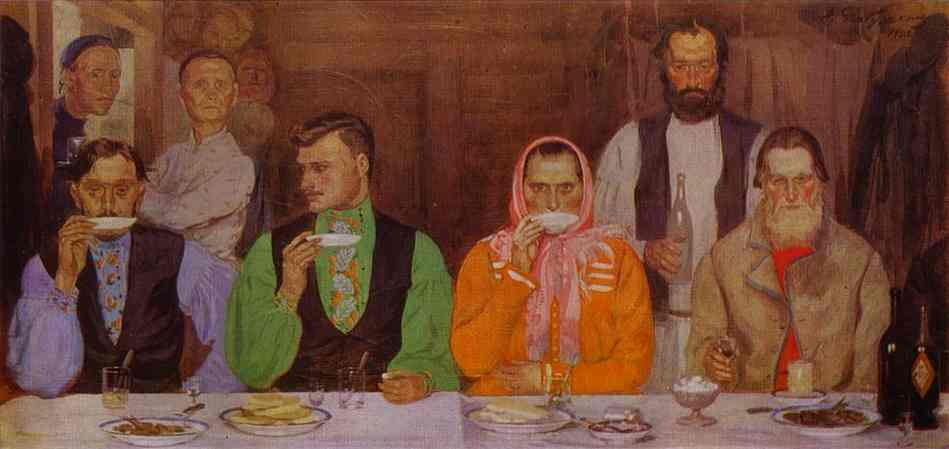
Tea-drinking

His paintings were mostly devoted to the 17th century. He also worked on frescoes for Saint Sophia Cathedral in Novgorod and mosaics for the Church of the Savior on Blood in Saint Petersburg. There are 24 of his mosaics on the walls of Church of the Savior on Blood (17 inside and seven outside) (1897–1900). In the later 19th century he became interested in the life of contemporary Russian peasants (such paintings as Tea-Drinking and A Young Man Breaking into the Girls' Dance).

The deep study of history made his paintings very reliable, but they did not evoke any sympathy in his contemporaries. Unlike Vasily Surikov, who used the dramatic historical episodes as his subjects, Ryabushkin painted everyday life of the 17th century. His works lack action, they do not depict social conflicts, as the democrats liked. On the other hand, they are not so “beautiful” to reflect the tastes of the rich conservatives. Nobody knew where to place Ryabushkin’s paintings and just did not accept them.

In 1903 Ryabushkin was diagnosed with tuberculosis. He went to Switzerland for treatment but it did not help. He died in his studio in Didvino on 27 April 1904. He is buried in Lyuban, and his tomb is protected as a cultural monument.

== More selected works ==
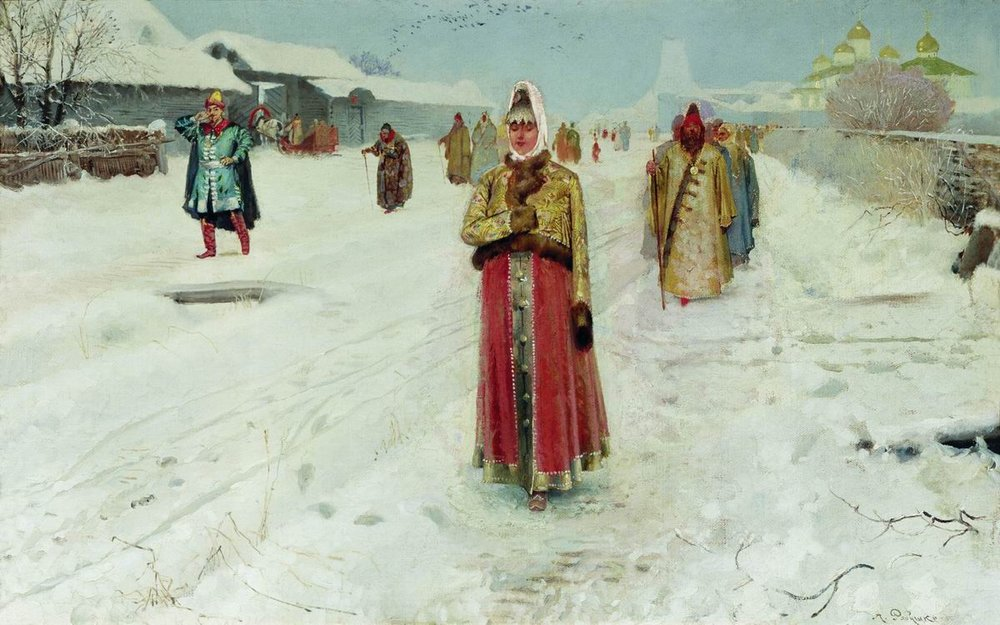
Sunday. 1889

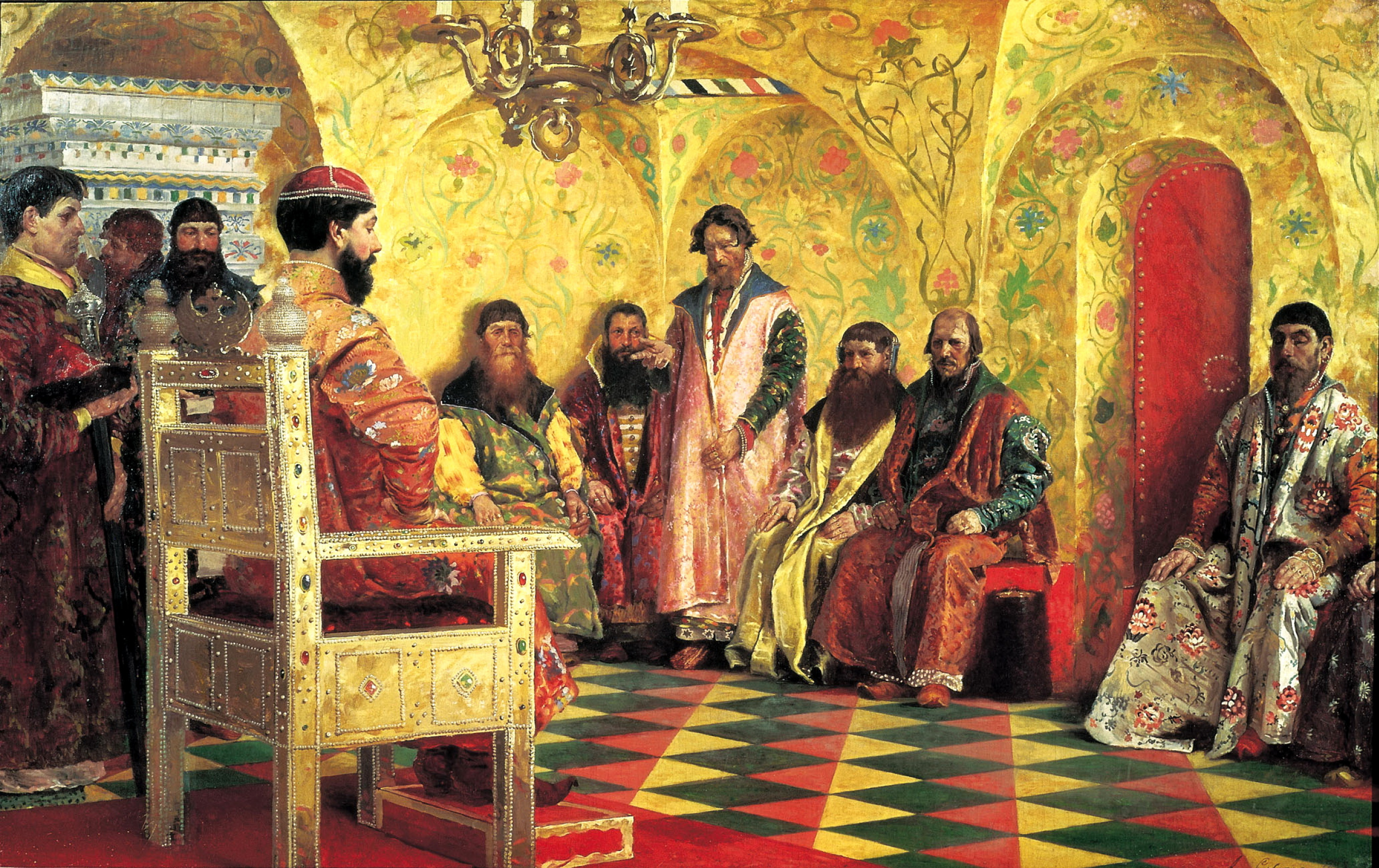
Session of Tsar Mikhail Feodorvich with his boyars in his State Chamber. 1893

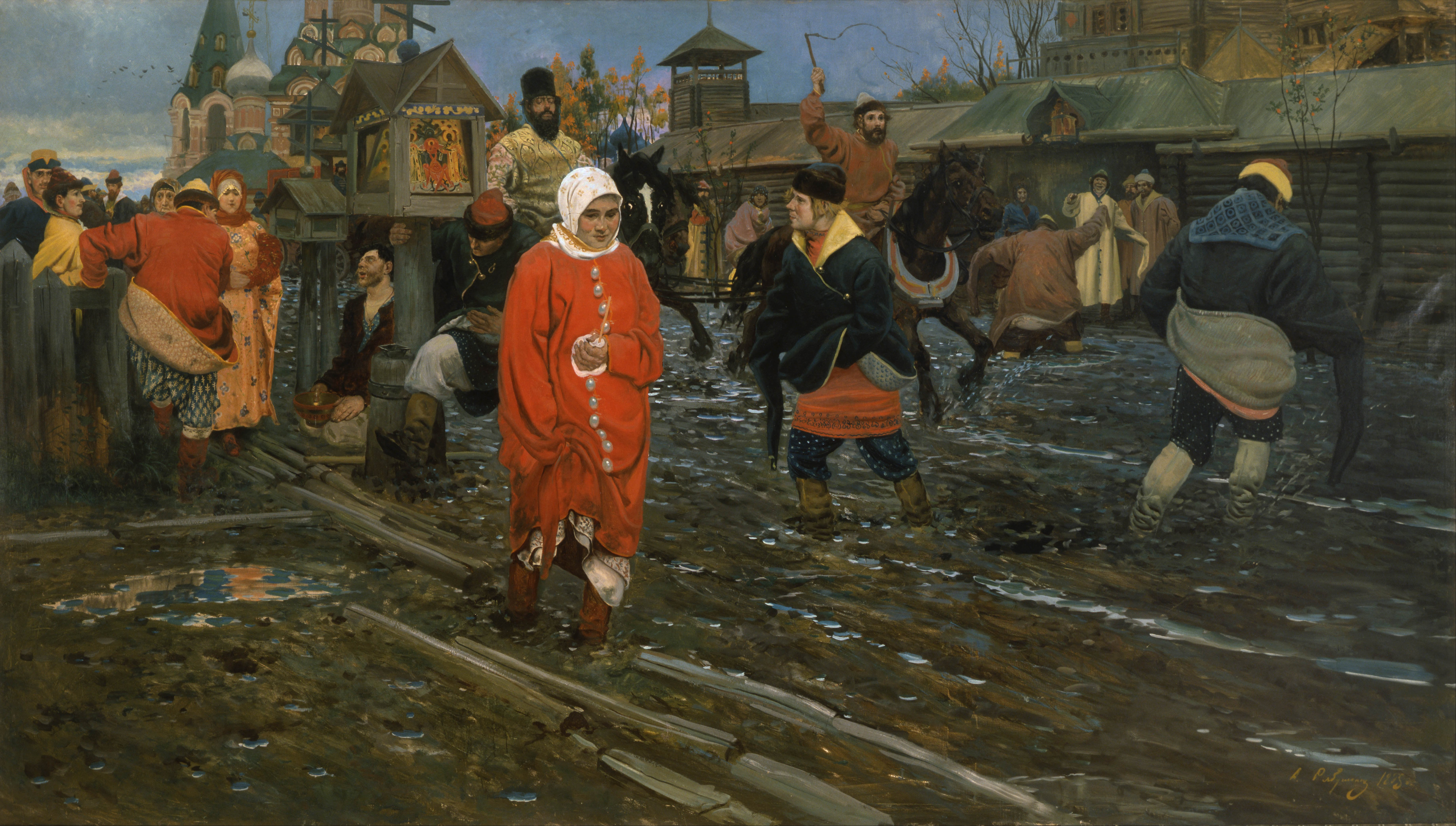
A 17th-century Moscow Street on a Holiday. 1895

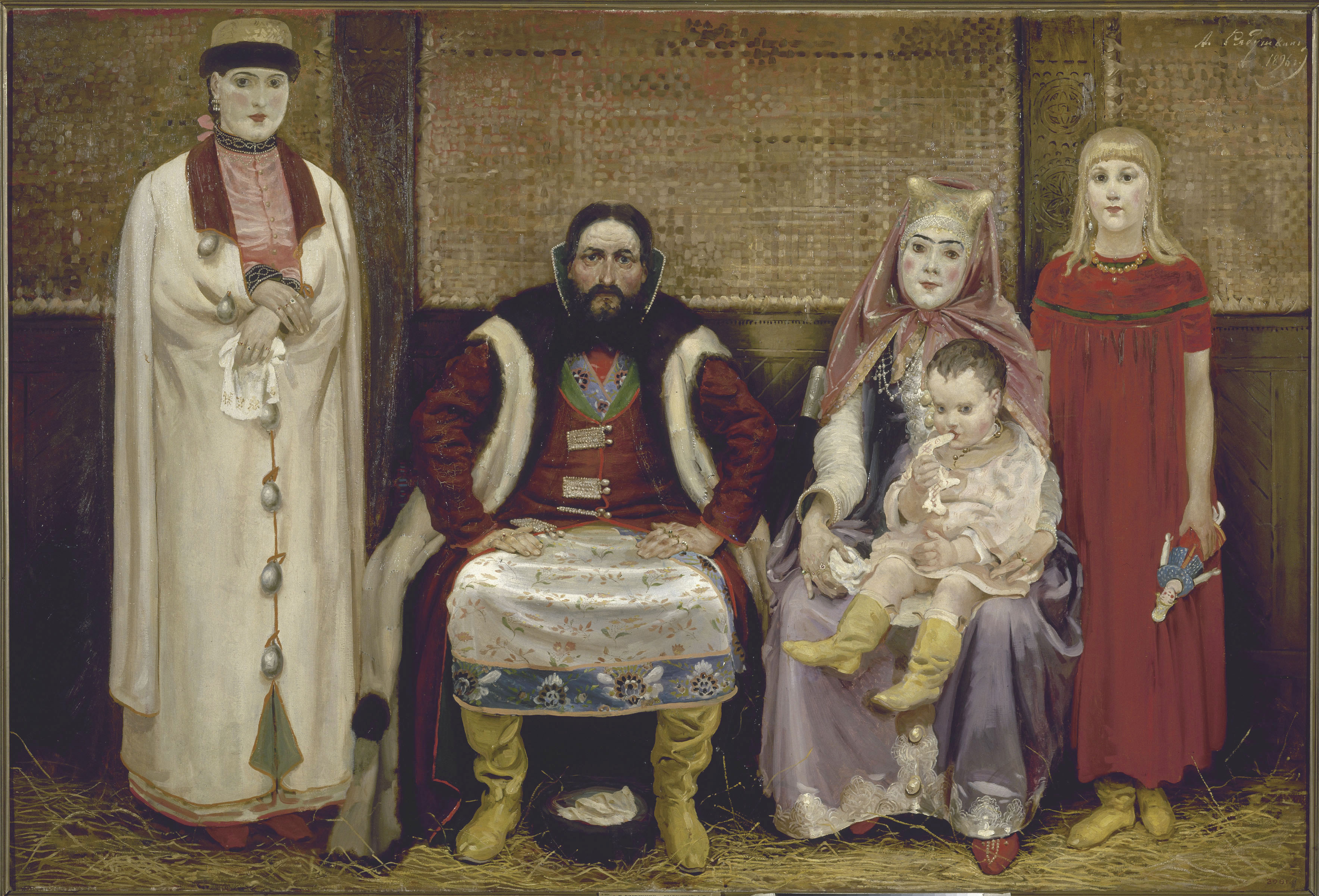
Merchant Family in the 17th century. 1896

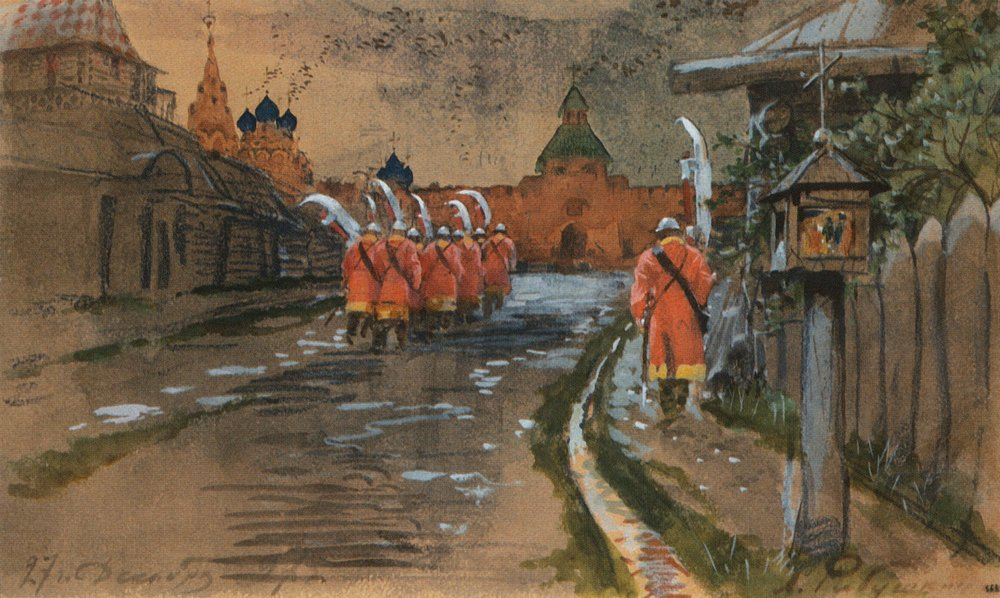
Strelets Patrol at the Ilyinsky Gates in Old Moscow. 1897

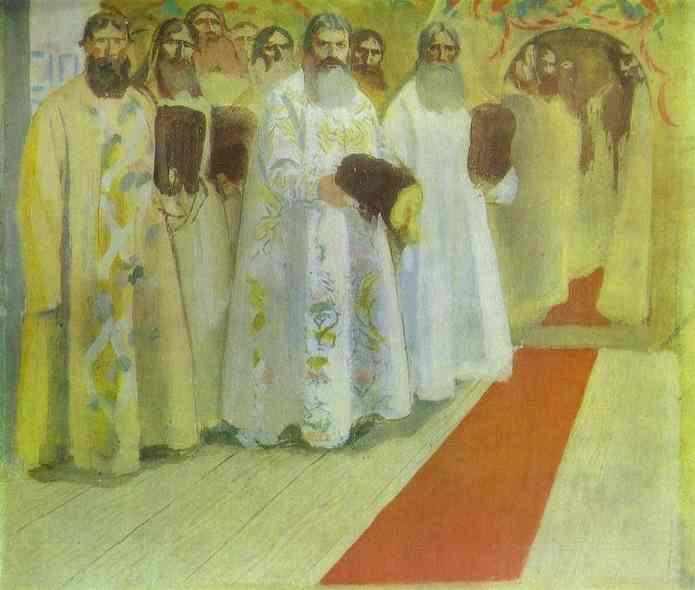
Waiting for the Tzar 1901

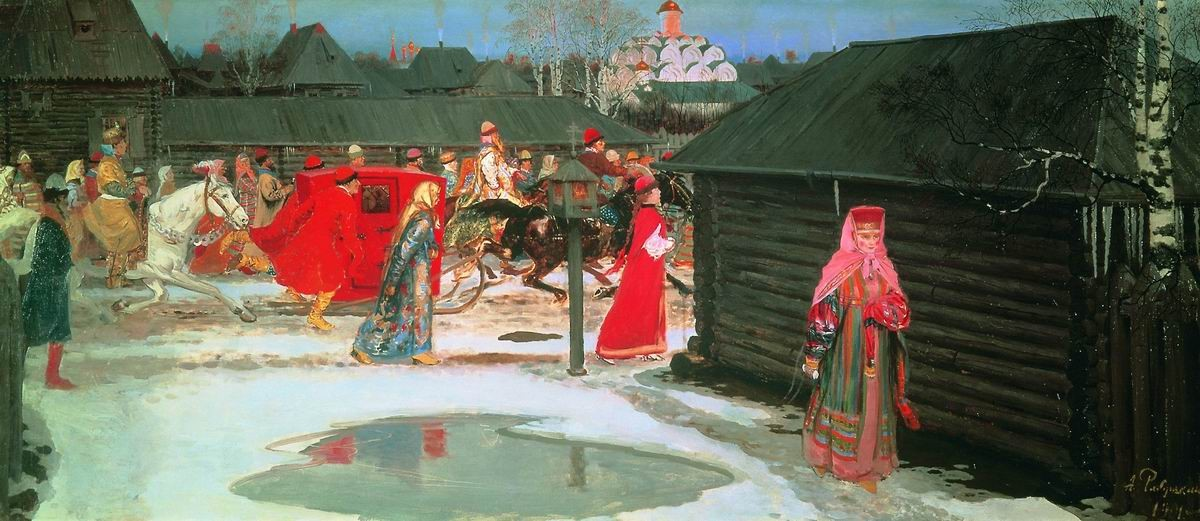
Wedding Train in the 17th century Moscow. 1901

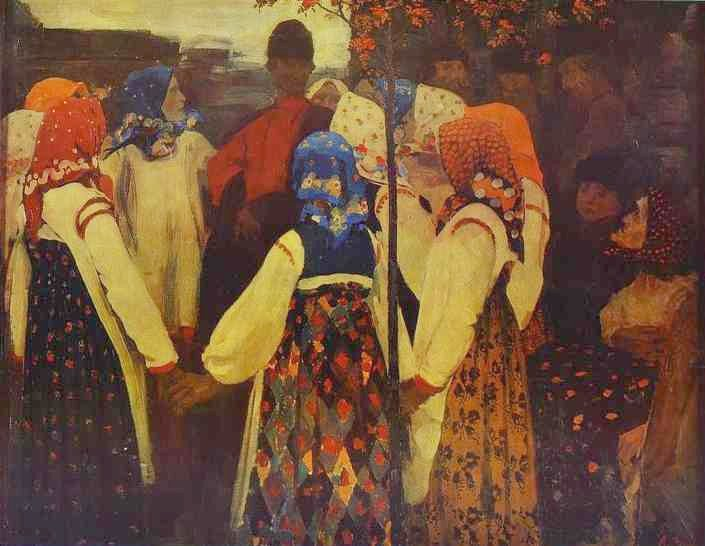
A Young Man Breaking into the Girls' Dance, and the Old Women are in Panic. 1902

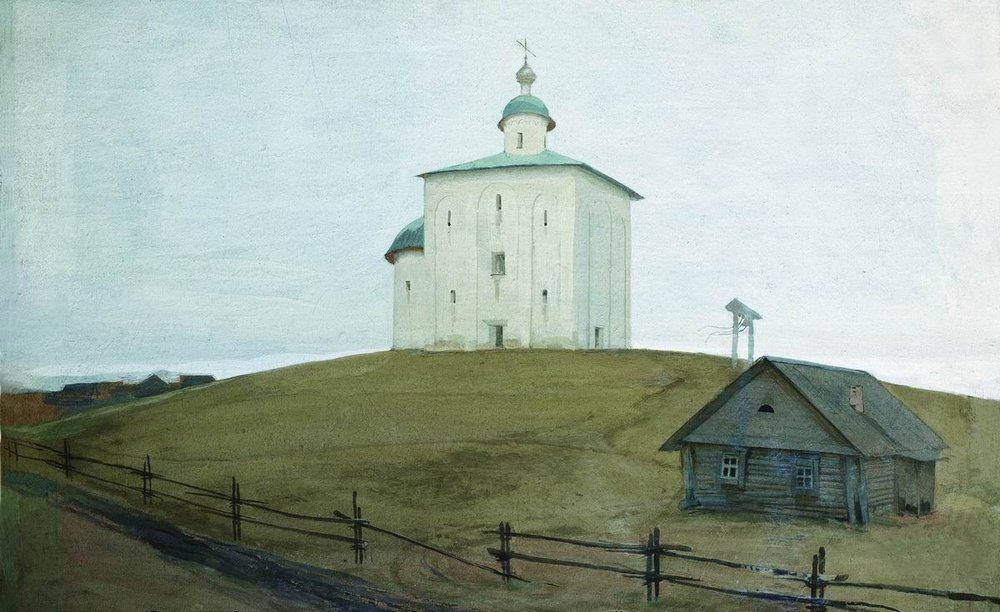
Novgorod Church. 1903

== See also ==
- List of Russian artists
