= Ilya Muromets (disambiguation) =

Ilya Muromets is an epic hero of Russian folklore

Ilya Muromets may also refer to:

== Arts and culture ==
- "Ilya Muromets", the subtitle of Symphony No. 3, Op. 42 (1911), by Reinhold Glière, lasting 80 minutes
- Ilya Muromets (film), a 1956 Soviet fantasy film directed by Aleksandr Ptushko

== Engineering and vehicles ==
- Ilya Muromets (icebreaker), a number of Soviet and Russian icebreaker ships
- Sikorsky Ilya Muromets, a class of early Russian four-engined commercial passenger aircraft dating from 1913, modified to become one of the first strategic bombers during World War I

== Places ==
- Ilya Muromets Waterfall, a waterfall on Iturup, one of the Kuril Islands
