= Vassa Zheleznova =

Vassa Zheleznova may refer to:

- Vassa Zheleznova (play), a play by Maxim Gorky
- Vassa Zheleznova (film), a 1953 Soviet drama film
