= Alexander Parkhomenko (disambiguation) =

Alexander Parkhomenko (1886–1921) was a Ukrainian Bolshevik revolutionary and Soviet military commander.

Alexander Parkhomenko may also refer to:

- Alexander Parkhomenko, Russian DJ with duo Matisse & Sadko
- Aliaksandr Parkhomenka (born 1981), Belarusian decathlete
- Alexander Parkhomenko (film), a 1942 Soviet adventure film
