= Sona Muradova =

Soviet and Turkemistani actress

- Сона Мурадова
- Born: 31 December 1914; Herrikgala, Transcaspian Oblast, Russia
- Died: 16 May 1997 (aged 82)
- Education: Ashgabat Pedagogical College
- Occupation: Actress
- Employer: Joseph Stalin Turkmen Drama Theater
- Political party: Communist Party of the Soviet Union
- Spouse: Atamurat Bekmuradov
- Awards: People's Artist of the USSR (1955); People's Artist of the Turkmen SSR

Member of the Soviet of Nationalities
- In office 1966–1974

Sona Muradova (Russian: Сона Мурадова; 31 December 1914 – 16 May 1997) was a Soviet and Turkmenistani actress and politician who performed at the Joseph Stalin Turkmen Drama Theater and was a member of the Soviet of Nationalities.

== Biography ==
Muradova was born on 31 December 1914 in Herrikgala (now in Ashgabat) and educated at the Ene Kulieva Boarding School for Girls and the Ashgabat Pedagogical College. After working as a teacher, she joined the Turkmen Drama Theater as an actress in 1934. She also worked as the Turkmen Drama Theater's director from 1955 until 1960. She was later educated at the Turkmen Opera Studio from 1939 to 1940, during which she appeared as Uzuk in G. Kakhiani's The Fate of Bakhshi.

She also appeared as Emilia in Othello and Vassa in Vassa Zheleznova, as well as in stage productions from other playwrights such as Bazar Amanow, Ata Atajanow, Garaja Burunow, Berdi Kerbabayev, and Güseýin Muhtarow. She also had a career in cinema, appearing in films like Family Honor (1956), The Quiet Daughter-in-law (1967), You Have to Love (1973), When a Woman Rides a Horse (1974), The Magic Book of Murad (1976), Pigeons Live in Karezes (1979), Time by the Sun (1979), The Old Man and the Girl (1981), and The Return of the Patron of Songs (1984).

In 1951, she was awarded the State Stalin Prize (3rd degree) for her performance as Bike in Guseyn Mukhtarov's The Allan Family. In 1955, she was awarded People's Artist of the USSR. She was also an Honored Artist and People's Artist of the Turkmen SSR. The Great Soviet Encyclopedia said of her: "a strong temperament, high emotionality are combined in [her] acting with a restrained manner of expressing the feelings of the heroines".

In 1940, she joined the Communist Party of the Soviet Union. She was a member of the Soviet of Nationalities during their seventh and eight convocations. She was also awarded the Medal "For Valiant Labour in the Great Patriotic War 1941–1945", the Order of the Red Banner of Labor in 1949, and the Order of Lenin in 1985.

She married actor Atamurat Bekmuradov. She died on 16 May 1997.

== Filmography ==
=== Stage ===
Year	Title	Role	Notes	Ref.
1939 or 1940	The Fate of Bakhshi	Uzuk	By G. Kakhiani	
?	Allan's Family	Bike	Written by Güseýin Muhtarow	
?	The Decisive Step	Aknabat	Written by Berdi Kerbabayev	
?	Koy-mir-Kyor	Ogyl Bostan	Written by Garaja Burunow and Bazar Amanow	
?	Kushkinskaya Fortress	Zaman's mother	Written by Ata Atajanow	
?	Othello	Emilia	Written by William Shakespeare	
?	Vassa Zheleznova	Vassa	Written by Maxim Gorky	
?	Who is the Criminal?	Dursunova	Written by Güseýin Muhtarow	

=== Film ===
Year	Title	Role	Notes	Ref.
1956	Family Honor	Bike	Dubbed by Anna Volgina	
1967	The Quiet Daughter-in-law	Neighbor		
1973	You Have to Love	Mother Shirin	Uncredited	
1974	When a Woman Rides a Horse	Witch doctor		
1976	The Magic Book of Murad	Aibibi		
1979	Pigeons Live in Karezes	Ogultuvak-edje	Dubbed by Nina Nikitina	
1979	Time by the Sun	Grandma Gozel		
1981	The Old Man and the Girl			
1984	The Return of the Patron of Songs			
