= The Golden Path =

The Golden Path may refer to:

- "The Golden Path" (song), a 2003 song by The Chemical Brothers
- The Golden Path (TV series), a Singaporean Chinese drama series
- The Golden Path (video game), a 1986 graphical adventure game
- Golden Path (Dune), a fictional concept in Frank Herbert's Dune universe
- Golden Path genome assembly, in genome projects, a feature of genome assembly
- Happy path in software development
- Golden Path, a medieval European salt trade route beginning in Passau, Bavaria, and passing through Prachatice, Bohemia
- Golden Path, a rebel troop in the video game Far Cry 4
- Golden Path (film), a 1945 Soviet drama film
