= Demon (volcano) =

Volcano in Iturup

Demon/Mount Kamuidake
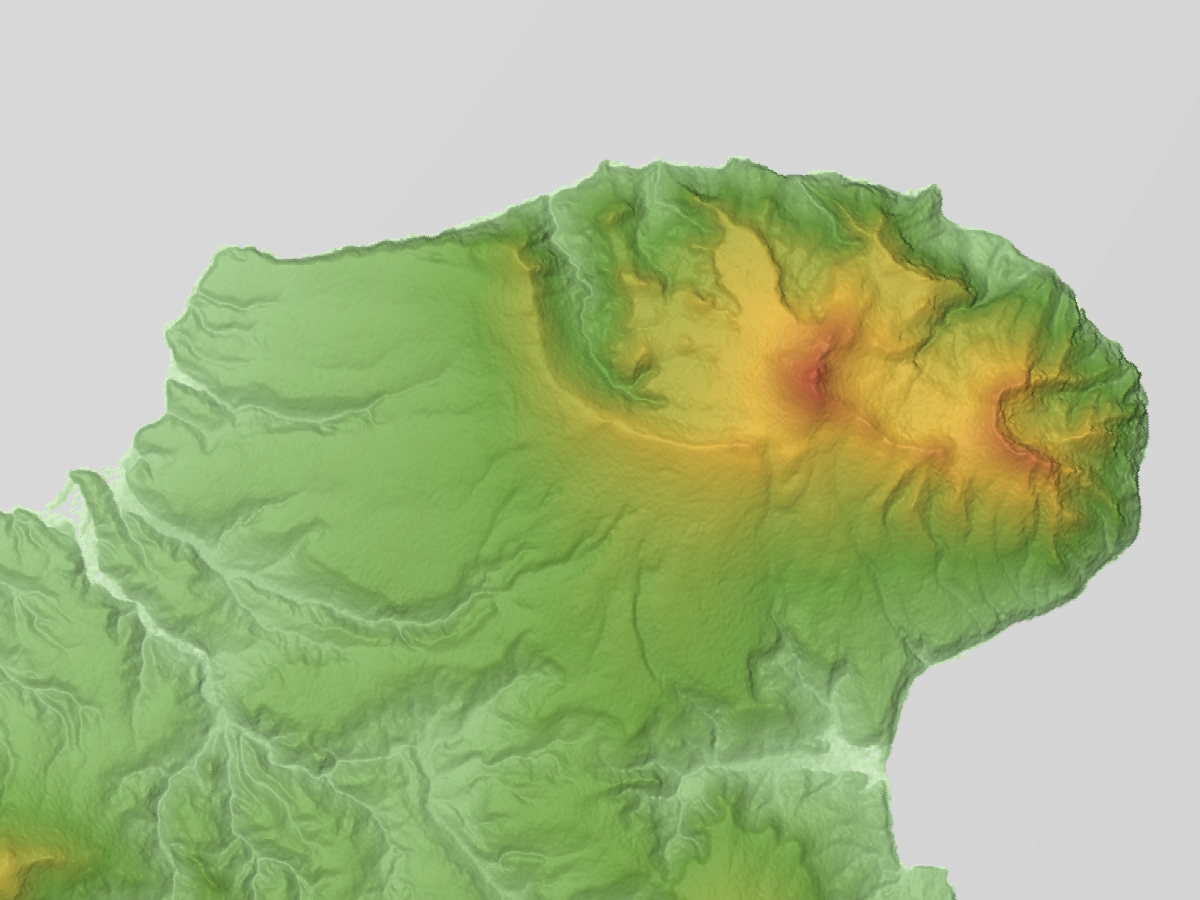

Highest point
- Elevation: 1,205 m (3,953 ft)
- Coordinates: 45.50°N 148.85°E

Geography
- Location within Far Eastern Federal District
- Location: Iturup, Kuril Islands

Geology
- Mountain type: Stratovolcano
- Last eruption: Unknown

Demon (Russian: Демон; Ainu: カムイヌプリ, romanized: Kamui-nupuri; Japanese: 神威岳, romanized: Kamui-dake) is a stratovolcano located at the northern end of Iturup Island, in the Kuril Archipelago.

The Ilya Muromets Waterfall (Rakkibetsu Waterfall) falls abruptly from the eastern slope of the volcano into the Pacific Ocean.

== In popular culture ==
- The Demon Volcano undergoes a VEI 7 eruption in Kirov series novel 9 Days Falling.
