= A Great Life =

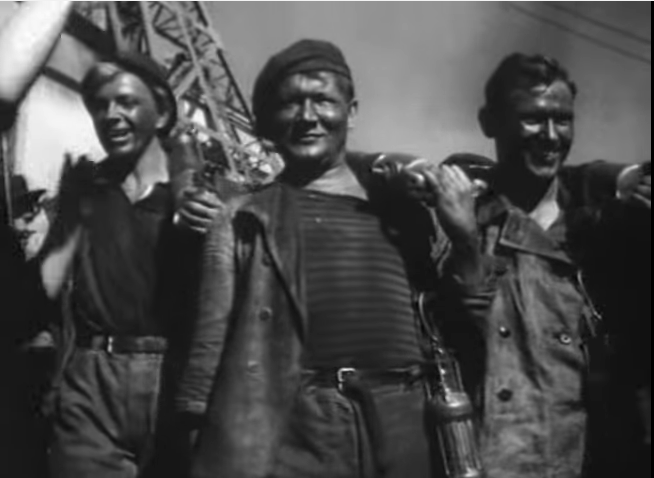
- Russian: Большая жизнь
- Directed by: Leonid Lukov
- Written by: Pavel Nilin
- Starring: Ivan Pelttser; Ivan Novoseltsev; Stepan Kayukov; Yuri Lavrov; Mark Bernes
- Cinematography: Ivan Shekker
- Music by: Nikita Bogoslovskiy
- Production company: Dovzhenko Film Studios
- Release date: 1939
- Running time: 94 min.
- Country: Soviet Union
- Language: Russian

A Great Life (Russian: Большая жизнь, romanized: Bolshaya zhizn) is a 1939 Soviet drama film directed by Leonid Lukov.

The film depicts a small mining village in the Donbas, where a young engineer’s innovative coal mining method faces resistance from a cautious mine committee chairman, but with the support of veterans and a determined party organizer, he perseveres to prove his method’s worth.

== Plot ==
A small mining village in the Donbas thrives on hard work and determination. Three months ago, a new Party organizer, Khadarov, arrived at the mine, revitalizing both the settlement and the mining operation. Efforts to re-equip the mine are underway, supported by young engineer Petukhov, who, with the encouragement of veteran miners Kuzma Kozodoev and Viktor Bugorkov, is developing an innovative coal extraction method. However, not everyone believes in its success. The chairman of the mine committee, Usynin, a man who avoids responsibility and fears failure, strongly opposes the initiative. Usynin repeatedly claims that Petukhov’s method is doomed, undermining morale and making Petukhov consider leaving the mine.

Encouraged by Kozodoev, Bugorkov, and Khadarov, Petukhov decides to stay and complete his work. When the chief engineer Ivanov falls ill, Khadarov insists that Petukhov take over his duties. This vote of confidence inspires Petukhov to redouble his efforts to implement the new method, which promises to revolutionize coal mining in the region.

The community’s journey, marked by conflicts, challenges, and personal transformations, unfolds as Khadarov’s leadership and the collective spirit of the miners drive the mine toward success and unity.

== Cast ==
- Ivan Pelttser as Kozodoev
- Ivan Novoseltsev as Khadarov
- Stepan Kayukov as Usynin
- Yuri Lavrov as Kuzmin
- Mark Bernes as Petukhov
- Vera Shershnyova as Sonya Osipova
- Boris Andreyev as Khariton Balun
- Pyotr Aleynikov as Vanya Kurskiy
- Lidiya Kartashyova as Kozodoev's wife
- Lavrenti Masokha as Makar Lyagotin
