= Mask (1938 film) =

- Russian: Маска
- Directed by: Sergei Sploshnov
- Written by: Anton Chekhov (story); Sergei Sploshnov
- Produced by: O. Kolodny
- Starring: Inna Fyodorova; Vsevolod Sanaev
- Cinematography: David Shlyugleyt
- Release date: 1938
- Country: Soviet Union
- Language: Russian

Mask (Russian: Маска) is a 1938 Soviet short drama film directed by Sergei Sploshnov.

== Plot ==
The film tells is based on the eponymous story by Anton Chekhov.

A charity ball masquerade was held at a social club. In the midst of the festivities, an unknown man in a coachman's outfit and black mask caused a scandal. He shoved noble gentlemen out of the reading room and settled down at a table set for two ladies. Neither the club official's pleas nor the police officer's intervention had any effect on him. He only became more boisterous and mocked the outraged guests.

When the troublemaker removed his mask, the stunned audience saw Yegor Nilych Pyatigov, a well-known millionaire and local benefactor. The public's indignation at the drunken hooligan's rude behavior quickly turned into approving laughter. Everyone tried to show that they appreciated the antics of such a remarkable joker. The organizer escorted the distinguished guest to his carriage and, to the great pleasure of those gathered, remarked that Yegor Nilych left content.

== Cast ==
- Konstantin Adashevsky
- Aleksandr Benyaminov
- Pyotr Gofman
- Stepan Kayukov
- Nikolay Litvinov
- Ivan Nazarov
- Vitali Politseymako
- Vladimir Taskin
