= Ilya Muromets (film) =

- VHS cover
- Directed by: Aleksandr Ptushko
- Written by: Mikhail Kochnev
- Based on: bylina
- Produced by: D. Vyatich-Berejnikh
- Starring: Boris Andreyev; Shukur Burkhanov; Andrei Abrikosov; Natalya Medvedeva; Yelena Myshkova
- Cinematography: Yuli Kun; Fedor Provorov
- Edited by: M. Kuzmina
- Music by: Igor Morozov
- Production company: Mosfilm
- Distributed by: Mosfilm
- Release date: 16 September 1956
- Running time: 91 minutes
- Country: Soviet Union
- Language: Russian

Ilya Muromets (Russian: Илья Муромец), also known as The Sword and the Dragon (US) and The Epic Hero and the Beast (UK), is a 1956 Soviet fantasy film by noted fantasy director Aleksandr Ptushko and produced at Mosfilm. It is based on the old Russian oral epic poems about the knight Ilya Muromets.

== Plot ==
The film opens in medieval Russia, where the aging bogatyr Svyatogor entrusts his magical sword to pilgrims before transforming into a mountain as he dies. Meanwhile, the Tugars, an Asiatic pagan horde, terrorize the land, pillaging villages, including that of Ilya Muromets. Crippled since childhood, Ilya is unable to protect his fiancée, Vassilisa, who is taken captive. Mishatychka, a villager caught by the Tugars, agrees to betray his people in exchange for his life. When pilgrims arrive at Ilya’s home, they cure his paralysis with a magical potion and song and present him with Svyatogor’s sword. Determined to defend his homeland, Ilya sets off on a journey, riding a foal that magically matures into a steed. Along the way, he defeats Nightingale the Robber, a monstrous forest dweller.

In Kiev, Prince Vladimir the Fair Sun oversees preparations against the Tugars. Ilya arrives, presenting Nightingale the Robber as a prisoner and earning the prince's admiration. He joins a brotherhood of bogatyrs alongside Dobrynya Nikitich and Alyosha Popovich. When the Tugar ambassador, the massive Idolishche Poganoye, demands an exorbitant tribute, Ilya refuses and kills him, escalating tensions. Rescuing Vassilisa from Tugar captors, Ilya temporarily reunites with her but leaves to continue his fight. Pregnant with Ilya's child, Vassilisa is recaptured by the Tugars and gives birth to their son, Sokolnichek, who is raised as a Tugar warrior by their leader, Tsar Kalin. Betrayed by Mishatychka, Ilya is imprisoned for a decade. Meanwhile, the Tugars besiege Kiev, demanding a vast ransom. Ilya is eventually freed and devises a clever ploy to delay the Tugars, allowing time for reinforcements to arrive. Mishatychka is exposed as a traitor and executed.

In the climactic battle, Ilya confronts his son, Sokolnichek, now a formidable warrior. Recognizing the familial bond, Sokolnichek switches sides, helping to free Vassilisa and other captives. The Rus' armies, led by Ilya, Dobrynya Nikitich, and Alyosha Popovich, engage the Tugars in a massive confrontation. During the battle, Tsar Kalin releases the fire-breathing dragon Zmey Gorynych, which is ultimately defeated by the Rus' forces. A final arrow from Kiev's ballista topples Tsar Kalin from his perch, ensuring victory. With the Tugars routed, Ilya declines royal honors to reunite with his family and embarks on new adventures, passing his sword and legacy to Sokolnichek, who continues the heroic lineage.

== Cast ==
- Boris Andreyev as Ilya Muromets
- Ninel Myshkova as Vassilisa
- Shukur Burkhanov as Tsar Kalin
- Andrey Abrikosov as Prince Vladimir
- Natalya Medvedeva as Princess Apraksia
- Aleksander Shvorin as Sokolnichek (20 years)
- Sergey Martinson as Mishatychka
- Sergei Stolyarov as Alyosha Popovich
- Iya Arepina as Alyonushka
- Mikhail Pugovkin as Razumey
- Muratbek Ryskulov as Nevryui
- An Seong-hee as Gypsy Dancer

Monsters besides Nightingale the Robber and the dragon Zmey Gorynych, are Idolishche Poganoye and Likho the One-Eyed.

== Production ==
Roger Corman re-edited the film in the early 1960s for US release, changing many names: Nightingale the Robber was changed to Wind Demon, Svyatogor became Invincor, Gorynych the Serpent was renamed Zuma the Fire Dragon, Dobrynya became Durbar, and the Khan was changed to Khalin. This version also includes narration by Mike Wallace and Shukur Burkhanov (Khalin) was dubbed by voice actor Paul Frees.

== Legacy ==
Corman's edit was featured in episode #617 of Mystery Science Theater 3000 (MST3K) as The Sword and the Dragon. The MST3K crew misinterpreted the film's nation of origin as Finland, and consequently filled the episode with jokes about the Finnish. The Sword and the Dragon is considered to be the third in the "MST3K Russo-Finnish troika".

The dragon Zmey Gorynych in the film was a heavy inspiration for the Kaiju King Ghidorah, who would go on to become the arch nemesis of Godzilla.

Ilya Muromets was adapted into a comic book by the publisher Dell as part of the Four Color anthology series (#1118, June 1960).

== See also ==
- Alexander Nevsky, a 1938 film featuring music by Sergei Prokofiev
- Vasilisa the Beautiful (1939)
