= Idolishche =

Slavic mythological monstrosity

Idolishche Poganoye (Russian: Идолище Поганое) is a mythological monstrosity from Russian bylinas (epic tales) and other folklore; he personifies pagan forces invading the Russian lands. The name literally means "pagan idol", with a Russian augmentative suffix "-ishche".

The major epic sources that involve Idolische are various variants of the bylina "Ilya Muromets and Idolishche Poganoye" ("Илья Муромец и Идолище Поганое"), which may also characterise Idolishche as "Tatarin" (the Tatar), in reference to the Tatar-Mongol yoke.

The 1956 fantasy-film Ilya Muromets depicts Idolishche as a massive zeppelin-like man with a bleach-white face arriving on an elevated platform as part of the Tugarin's forces and mocked as looking like "a fat ox" by one of the Russian characters.
