= Leonid Lukov =

Soviet director and screenwriter (1909–1963)

- Born: Leonid Davydovich Lukov; 2 May 1909; Mariupol, Yekaterinoslav Governorate, Russian Empire (now Ukraine)
- Died: 24 April 1963 (aged 53); Leningrad, Russian, Soviet Union (now St. Petersburg, Russia)
- Occupations: Film director Screenwriter

Leonid Davydovich Lukov (Russian: Леонид Давидович Луков; 2 May 1909 – 24 April 1963) was a Soviet film director and screenwriter. He directed 25 films between 1930 and 1963. Leonid Lukov was named People's Artist of the RSFSR in 1957 and awarded the Stalin Prize twice: in 1941 and 1952. He died in Leningrad.

== Filmography ==
- Scum (Накипь); 1930, short
- Komsomol is my Motherland (Родина моя — комсомол); 1931, documentary
- Roots of Commune (Корешки коммуны); 1931
- Italian (Итальянка); 1931
- Eshelon No... (Эшелон №...); 1932
- Youth (Молодость); 1934
- I Love (Я люблю); 1936
- Director (Директор); 1938
- A Great Life, Part 1 (Большая жизнь, 1 серия); 1939
- Nother (Мать); 1941, short
- Alexander Parkhomenko (Александр Пархоменко); 1942
- Two Soldiers (Два бойца); 1943
- It Happened in the Donbass (Это было в Донбассе); 1945
- A Great Life, Part 2 (Большая жизнь, 2 серия); 1946
- Private Aleksandr Matrosov (Рядовой Александр Матросов); 1947
- Miners of the Don (Донецкие шахтеры); 1950
- Vassa Zheleznova (Васса Железнова); 1953
- Barbarians (Варвары); 1953
- Least We Forget (Об этом забывать нельзя); 1954
- To a New Shore (К новому берегу); 1955
- Different Fortunes (Разные судьбы); 1956
- Aleksa Dundić (Олеко Дундич); 1958
- Two Lives (Две жизни); 1961
- Trust me, People (Верьте мне, люди); 1964
