= I Am a Sailor of the Black Sea Fleet =

- Russian: Я — черноморец!
- Directed by: Aleksander Macheret; Vladimir Braun
- Written by: Leonid Solovyov
- Starring: Boris Andreyev; Larisa Yemelyantseva; Andrei Sova; Fyodor Ishchenko; B. Goloskov
- Cinematography: Aleksandr Lavrik
- Music by: Dmitriy Klebanov
- Release date: 1944
- Country: Soviet Union
- Language: Russian

I Am a Sailor of the Black Sea Fleet, (Russian: Я — черноморец!) is a 1944 Soviet World War II film directed by Aleksander Macheret and Vladimir Braun.

The film tells about the hereditary Black Sea, Stepan Polosukhin, going to the fleet. At the beginning of the Great Patriotic War, he receives the first task - to scout the firing points of the enemy, which he successfully manages and he begins to fight the fascists on the Black Sea coast.

== Plot ==
Captain Safonov sends his beloved, scout Valya, on a mission to a Nazi-occupied city, where a brutal general has just arrived to take command. Valya's task is to gather intelligence, with Safonov's mother acting as a contact. Meanwhile, the situation for Soviet forces is dire as they run out of food and water with no reinforcements in sight. Valya is assigned to destroy a strategic bridge, but her mission is compromised by a German spy embedded in the Soviet unit. The spy is caught but manages to alert the Germans, leading to an ambush at the crossing where Valya is captured. To assist her and mislead the German command, Safonov sends an experienced scout, Lieutenant Globa, into the city. At the same time, the grieving wife of the city mayor, distraught over her son's death fighting for the Red Army, poisons the newly arrived general.

Globa successfully deceives the German command, diverting their attention from the critical bridge and redirecting their forces toward Major Vasin's unit. To test Globa's claims of being a defecting Soviet soldier, the Germans imprison him alongside Valya and an informant. Globa maintains his cover under interrogation. At the critical moment, Soviet troops march into the city via the bridge. As the Germans retreat, they execute the prisoners, but Globa shields Valya, sacrificing himself to save her.

== Cast ==
- Boris Andreyev as Stepan Polosukhin and His father Grigoriy Polosukhin
- Larisa Yemelyantseva as Vera
- Andrei Sova as Boatswain
- Fyodor Ishchenko as Cutter commander
- B. Goloskov as Signalman
- Vladimir Vyazemskiy as Fyodor Ignatyevich, a partisan
- Vladimir Gribkov as Vasiliy Karpovich, a partisan
- Anatoliy Smiranin as German major
- Hans Klering as German lieutenant
- Georgiy Kurovskiy as Krotov
