= Bogatyr Ridge =

Stratovolcano on Iturup Island

- Stokap
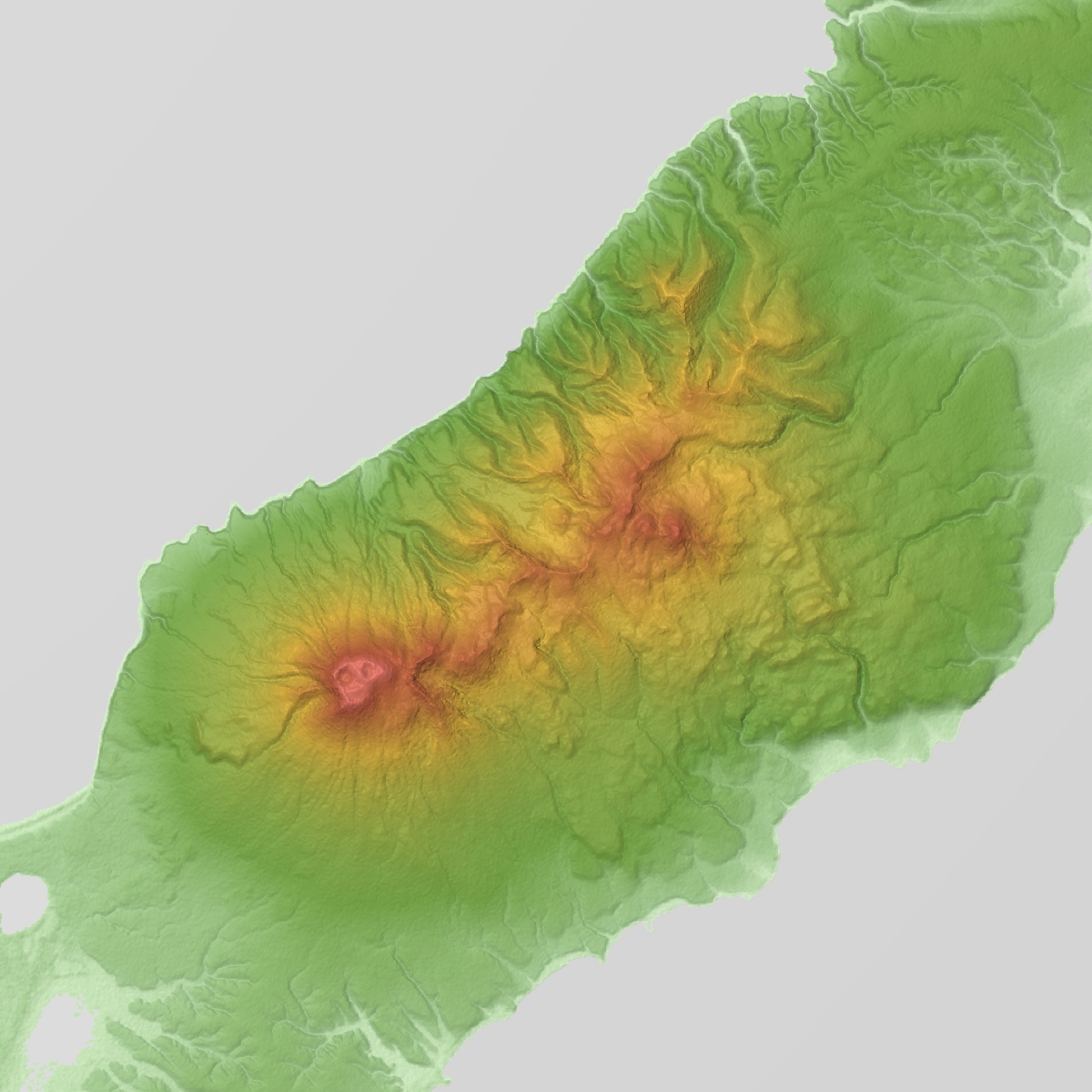

Highest point
- Elevation: 1,634 m (5,361 ft)
- Prominence: 1,634 m (5,361 ft)
- Listing: Ultra, Ribu
- Coordinates: 44°50′15″N 147°20′36″E

Geography
- Location within Russia
- Location: Iturup, Kuril Islands, Russia

Geology
- Mountain type: Stratovolcano
- Last eruption: Unknown

Bogatyr Ridge (Russian: Богатырь; Japanese: 単冠山, Hitokappu-san) is a stratovolcano located in the central part of Iturup Island, Kuril Islands, Russia. The highest peak of the ridge is Stokap (Russian: Стокап) which is also the highest peak of the island.

== See also ==
- List of volcanoes in Russia
- List of ultras of Northeast Asia

== Sources ==
- "Bogatyr Ridge". Global Volcanism Program. Smithsonian Institution.
- "Gora Stokap, Russia". Peakbagger.com.
