= Vetrovoye Air Base =

Vetrovoye
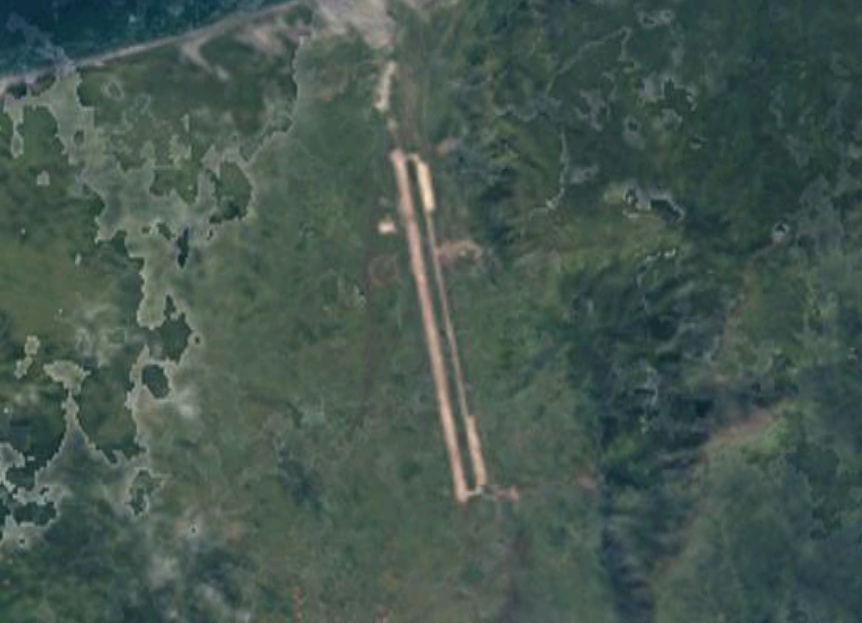
- Vetrovoye, 1984 Landsat image.
- IATA: none; ICAO: none

Summary
- Airport type: Military
- Operator: Soviet Navy 1960s-1990s unknown
- Location: Iturup Island, Russia
- Elevation AMSL: 59 ft / 18 m
- Coordinates: 45°15′6″N 148°18′42″E

Map
- Location in Sakhalin Oblast Vetrovoye (Japan) Vetrovoye (Russia) Vetrovoye (Asia)

Runways
Direction	Length		Surface
Direction	ft	m	Surface
18/36	9,842	3,000	Concrete

Vetrovoye (also Sopochny Southwest) is a former Soviet Naval air base on Iturup, Russia located 66 km (41 mi) northeast of Burevestnik (Tennei before 1945). The airfield was built in the early or mid-1960s, following a directive by Defense Minister Rodion Malinovsky that every American aircraft carrier between Midway Island and the Kuril Ridge be photographed by Soviet Tupolev Tu-16R reconnaissance aircraft. At the time, Soviet Naval air assets for this region were based on Sakhalin Island. The project was commissioned by Soviet Navy commander in chief Sergey Gorshkov and completed in the mid-1960s, at which point the 50th Aviation Cavalry Regiment was relocated from Sakhalin to Vetrovoye.

At the end of the Cold War the airfield fell into disuse, and Google Earth high-resolution imagery shows the airfield to be in poor condition. The outline of the runways and tarmac is still visible from satellite imagery.

== Notes ==
- http://www.weathergraphics.com/tim/russia/Vetrovoe.htm
