= Ivan Nikulin: Russian Sailor =

- Russian: Иван Никулин - русский матрос
- Directed by: Igor Savchenko
- Written by: Leonid Solovyov
- Starring: Ivan Pereverzev; Boris Chirkov; Stepan Kayukov; Erast Garin; Zoya Fyodorova
- Cinematography: Fyodor Provorov
- Music by: Sergei Pototsky
- Release date: 1944
- Country: Soviet Union
- Language: Russian

Ivan Nikulin: Russian Sailor, (Russian: Иван Никулин - русский матрос) is a 1944 Soviet World War II film directed by Igor Savchenko.

== Plot ==
The film takes place in the summer of 1942. The film tells the story of the Black Sea fleet sailors Ivan Nikulin and Vasily Klevtsov who are returning to the frontlines to reunite with their crewmates. On the way, they meet other sailors who join them and help to rebuff the Germans who stand in their way.

== Cast ==
- Ivan Pereverzev as Ivan Nikulin
- Boris Chirkov as Zakhar Fomichyov (as B. Chirkov)
- Stepan Kayukov as Papasha (as S. Kayukov)
- Erast Garin as Tikhon Spiridonovich (as E. Garin)
- Zoya Fyodorova as Marusya Kryukova
- Nikolay Sidorkin as Nikolay Zhukov (as N. Sidorkin)
- Sergey Nikonov as Vasiliy Klevtsov (as S. Nikonov)
- Vsevolod Sanaev as Alyokha (as V. Sanaev)
- Mikhail Rumyantsev as Italian Soldier (as M. Rumyantsev)
- Viktor Bubnov as Commandant (uncredited)
