= Alexander Parkhomenko =

Ukrainian Bolshevik revolutionary and Soviet military commander

- Олександр Якович Пархоменко
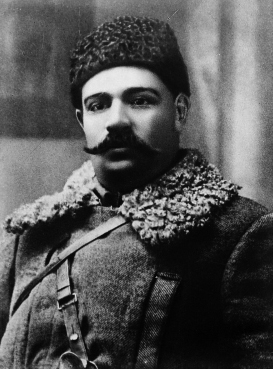
- Born: 24 December [O.S. 12 December] 1886; Makariv Yar, Yekaterinoslav Governorate, Russian Empire (now Sorokyne urban hromada, Luhansk Oblast, Ukraine)
- Died: 3 January 1921 (aged 34); Buzovskaya volost, Tarashcha uezd, Kiev, Ukrainian SSR
- Military career
- Allegiance: Soviet Russia
- Conflicts: Russian Civil War; Polish-Soviet War
- Awards: (×2)

Signature
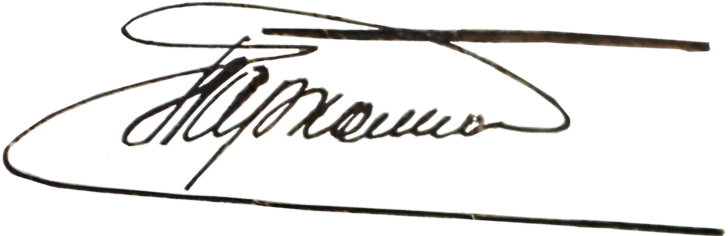

Alexander Yakovlevich (Oleksandr Yakovych) Parkhomenko (Russian: Александр Яковлевич Пархоменко, Ukrainian: Олександр Якович Пархоменко; 24 December 1886 – 3 January 1921) was a Ukrainian Bolshevik revolutionary and Soviet military commander.

== Biography ==
Alexander Parkhomenko was born in the peasant family of a village potter. From 1900 he worked at a steam-locomotive factory in Luhansk. In 1904 he joined the Bolshevik faction of the Russian Social Democratic Labour Party. He took part in the 1905 Revolution, commanding an armed detachment of workers and then peasants from his native village. After the revolution he was arrested several times. During the revolution he met and worked under the guidance of Kliment Voroshilov, who after 1917 facilitated his military career.

In 1916 Parkhomenko led a political, anti-war strike of workers at the ammunition factory in Luhansk. In the same year he was mobilized into the Imperial Russian Army, but was not sent to the front and remained in a reserve regiment in Voronezh, conducting Bolshevik propaganda among the soldiers. During the February Revolution he stayed and worked in Moscow, then returned to Luhansk and created Red Guard units there. He took part in establishing Bolshevik power in the Donbas after the October Revolution. He participated in battles with the White Cossacks of Ataman Kaledin (he also took part in repressions against the Cossack forces) and in battles with units of the Ukrainian Central Rada. In March 1918 he became the chief of staff of the unit commanded by Voroshilov fighting against German troops in Ukraine. Together with Voroshilov, he left Ukraine in June 1918, retreating to Tsaritsyn.

In October 1918, he became the plenipotentiary of the revolutionary military council of the 10th Army. In January 1919, he was entrusted with the position of military commissar of the Kharkov Governorate, head of the Kharkov garrison, and plenipotentiary for supply of the Kharkov Military District. He took part in the suppression of the Hryhoriv uprising. On 15 May, the troops he commanded the drove of Hryhoiv's supporters out of Yekaterinoslav. In June of the same year, he led the unsuccessful defense of Kharkov against the White Armed Forces of South Russia, suffering a complete defeat in a clash with the Volunteer Army under the command of General Vladimir May-Mayevsky.

In December 1919, Parkhomenko became the plenipotentiary of the revolutionary-military council of the 1st Cavalry Army, and in April 1920 he commanded the 14th Maykop Cavalry Division. In 1920, he took part in the Polish–Soviet War. In the autumn of the same year, he took part in the Northern Taurida Operation against the Armed Forces of Southern Russia.

In December of the same year, after the White forces were forced to leave Crimea and the Red Army took up the fight against Nestor Makhno's anarchists, with whom it had previously cooperated, Parkhomenko was sent to fight against the Makhnovists and was killed in an ambush organized by them.

== Commemoration ==
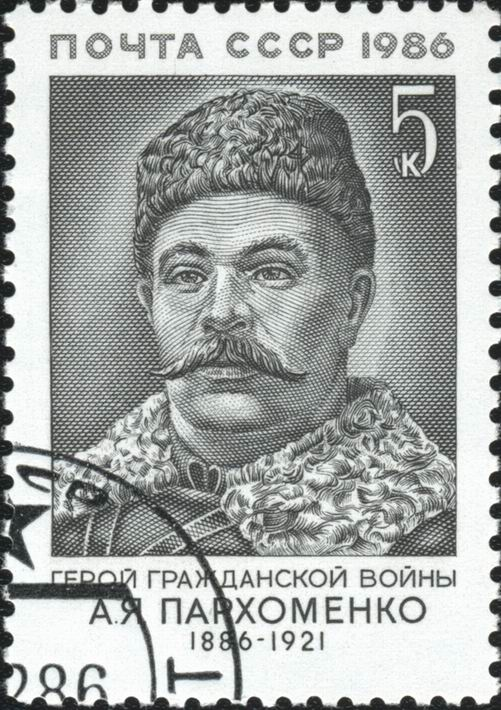
Soviet 1986 commemorative stamp featuring Alexander Parkhomenko

After his Parkhomenko was posthumously awarded the Order of the Red Banner for the second time. After the Civil War, he entered the pantheon of the most revered heroes of the Civil War in the Soviet Union and dozens of streets, villages and enterprises were named after him in Russia, Ukraine and Belarus.

In 1942 the Soviet biographical film Alexander Parkhomenko was released based on a novel written by Vsevolod Ivanov.

In his native village, the Historical and Memorial Museum of Alexander Parkhomenko was opened in the premises of his parents’ house.
