= Boris Andreyev (actor) =

Soviet actor (1915-1982)

- Борис Андреев
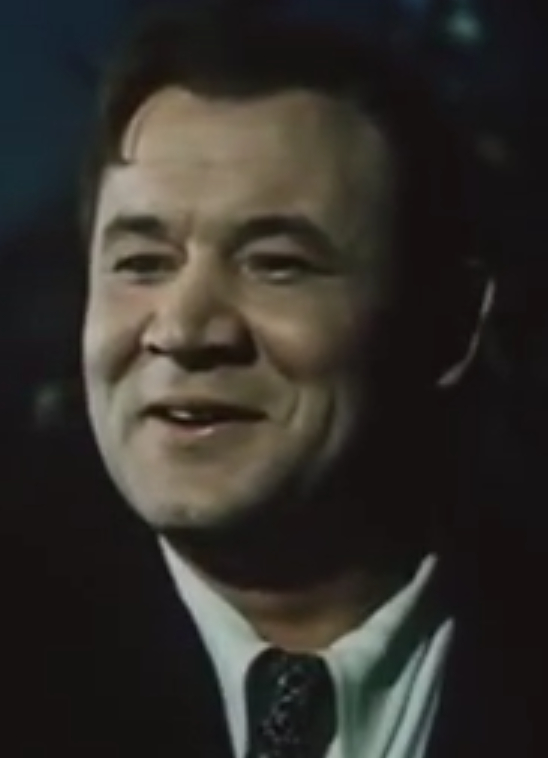
- Andreyev in The Fall of Berlin, 1950
- Born: 9 February 1915; Saratov, Russian Empire
- Died: 25 April 1982 (aged 67); Moscow, Russian SFSR, Soviet Union
- Resting place: Vagankovo Cemetery, Moscow
- Occupations: Actor, voice actor
- Years active: 1937–1982
- Honours: People's Artist of the USSR (1962)

Boris Fyodorovich Andreyev (Note: Russian: Бори́с Фёдорович Андре́ев, romanized: Boris Fyodorovich Andreyev) (9 February [O.S. 27 January] 1915 – 25 April 1982) was a Soviet actor. He appeared in 51 films between 1939 and 1982. People's Artist of the USSR (1962). Andreev won two State Stalin Prizes for his roles in Pyryev’s Ballad of Siberia (1946) and The Fall of Berlin (1950).

== Biography ==
Boris Andreyev was born 9 February 1915 in Saratov, Russian Empire to a family of workers. His childhood and youth years were spent in Atkarsk, Saratov Governorate. After completing the seventh grade at school, Andreyev went to work as a mechanic-electrician at a сombine factory, where he started going to a local theatrical circle. There he was noticed by a famous Saratov actor, Ivan Slonov, who suggested that he enter the Saratov Theatre Technical School, from which Boris Andreyev graduated in 1937.

For a while, Boris Andreyev played on the Saratov Drama Theater's stage. During the theater tour in Moscow, film director Ivan Pyryev offered him the role of Nazar Duma in Tractor Drivers (1939). It became his first film role and also brought him great popularity in the medium.

His next notable role was as Khariton Balun in A Great Life (1st part in 1939, 2nd part in 1958).

During the Second World War, Andreyev with Mark Bernes acted in the legendary Soviet film Two Soldiers (1943).

In the role of Ilya Zhurbin in A Big Family (1954), Andreyev demonstrated his ability to play psychologically-complicated characters. His roles in Cruelty (1959) and The Road to Berlin (1962) brought forth two of his most intense performances. The role of Vozhak in the film An Optimistic Tragedy became one of the defining performances of his career and one of its major highlights.

In the 1971–1973, Boris Andreyev served as the narrator of several documentaries, such as People's Artist Andreyev, People's Artist Kasymov and People's Artist Shukur Burkhanov.

Andreyev died on 25 April 1982 in Moscow, and was buried at Vagankovo Cemetery in Moscow.

== Filmography ==
Year	Title	Role	Notes
1939	Shchors	Young Red Armist	Uncredited
1939	Tractor Drivers	Nazar Duma	
1939	The Fighters	Fighter Pilot	
1939	A Great Life	Khariton Balun	
1941	Valery Chkalov	Mechanic 'Chizhik'	
1941	Bogdan Khmelnitskiy	Ivan, called Dovbna, Shaytan's son / Boyar Pushkin	
1942	Combat Movie Collection 8	Makar	(segment "Three in a Tank")
1942	Aleksandr Parkhomenko	Anarchist	Uncredited
1943	Years Young	Zakhar	
1943	Son of Tajikistan	Ivan	
1943	Road to the Stars	Pilot	Uncredited
1943	Two Soldiers	Sasha	
1944	I Am a Sailor of the Black Sea Fleet	Stepan Polosukhin and His father Grigoriy Polosukhin	
1944	The Last Hill	Maj. Zhukovskiy	
1945	Golden Path	Epifanstev	
1945	Dark Is the Night	Lyosha Khristoforov	
1946	A Great Life 2	Khariton Balun	
1948	Ballad of Siberia	Yakov Zakharonovich Burmak	
1948	White Darkness	Soviet partisan Dugin	
1949	Encounter at the Elbe	Sgt. Egorkin	
1950	The Fall of Berlin	Aleksei Ivanov	
1950	Cossacks of the Kuban	Fedya	
1951	The Unforgettable Year 1919	Vladimir Shibayev	
1953	Maksimka	Seaman Luchkin	
1954	Marina's Destiny	Matvey	
1954	A Big Family	Ilya Matveyevich Zhurbin	
1956	The Mexican	Paulino Vera	
1956	Ilya Muromets	Ilya Muromets	
1958	Poem of the Sea	Savva Zarudnyi	
1959	The Sisters	Sailor Chugay	
1959	In Steppe Silence	episode	
1959	Cruelty	Lazar Baulin	
1959	Foma Gordeev	Zvantsev	
1961	Chronicle of Flaming Years	general Glazunov	
1961	The Cossacks	Eroshka	
1962	The Road to Berth	Zosima Rosomakha botsman	
1963	Velká cesta	Voják	
1963	An Optimistic Tragedy	Vozhak	
1963	Melodies of Dunayevsky	cameo	
1964	The Enchanted Desna	Platon Poltorak	
1965	Above us is the Southern Cross	Fedoseenko	
1967	On the Wild Shore	Litvinov	
1967	Aladdin and His Magic Lamp	episode	
1968	Angel Day	Gryzlov	
1970	Night Сall	Lavrentiy Kvashnin	
1972	Treasure Island	Long John Silver	
1974	Vanyushin's Children	Aleksandr Vanyushin	
1974	Entrant Ыtudent	Petro	
1974	Pyotr Martynovich and the Years of Great Life	cameo	
1975	At the World's Limit	Trackman	
1976	Appointed Granddaughter	Timofey	
1980	Sergei Ivanovich Rtires	Sergey Ivanovich	
1983	Tears Were Falling	Nikolai Vanichkin	
1983	Preface to the Battle	Mokhov	
