= Symphony No. 3 (Glière) =

Symphony by Reinhold Glière

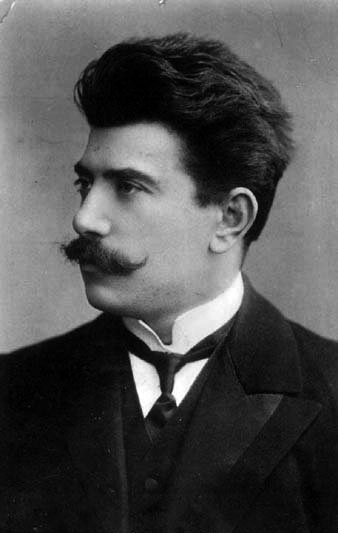
Reinhold Glière before 1917

The Symphony No. 3 in B minor "Ilia Mourometz", Op. 42, is a large symphonic work by Russian composer Reinhold Glière. A program symphony, it depicts the life of Kievan Rus' folk hero Ilya Muromets. It was written from 1908 to 1911 and dedicated to Alexander Glazunov. The premier took place in Moscow on 23 March 1912 under Emil Cooper, and in 1914 the piece earned Glière his third Glinka Award (having already received it in 1905 and 1912).

== Outline ==
The symphony lasts 70 to 80 minutes, and is divided into four sections, each depicting an episode from the epic. Glière wrote an extensive narrative in Russian and French to accompany the score.

=== I. Wandering Pilgrims: Ilya Muromets and Svyatogor ===
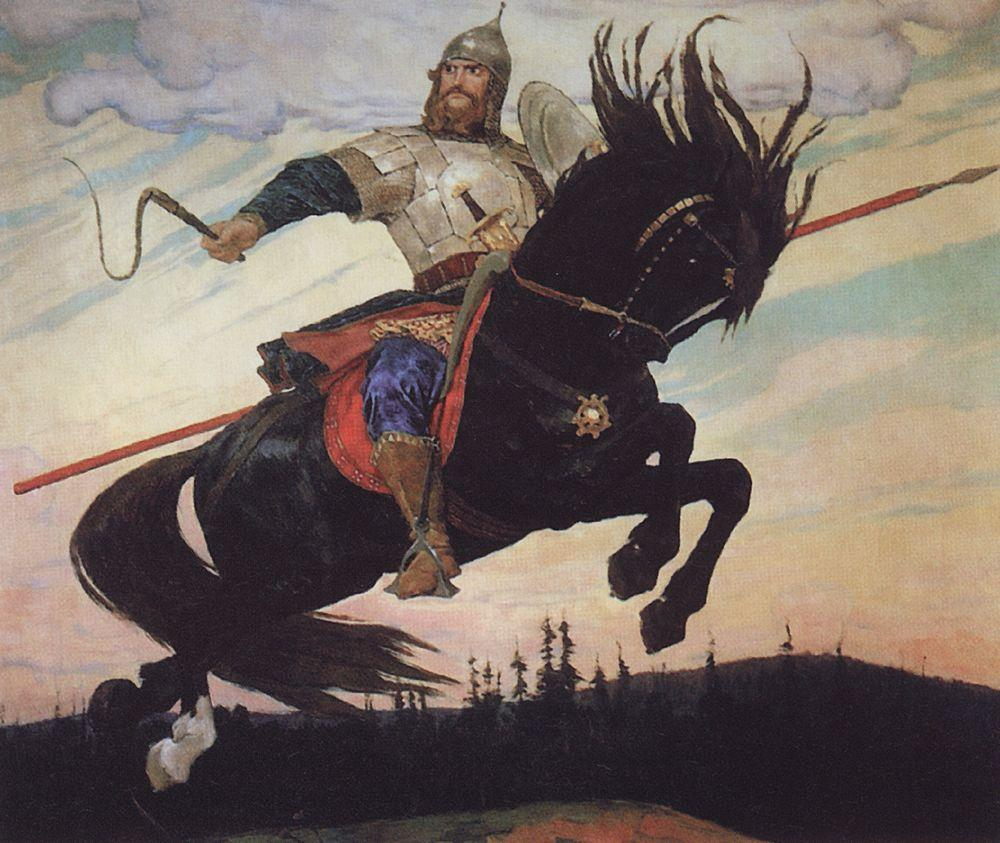
Ilya Muromets (1914) by Viktor Vasnetsov.

Andante sostenuto – Allegro risoluto. Two pilgrims tell Ilya to become a bogatyr. The most powerful bogatyr, Svyatogor, bequeaths his strength to Ilya as he dies.

=== II. Solovei the Brigand ===
Andante. Ilya encounters Solovei the Brigand, a bandit whose whistle can kill. Ilya shoots him in the eye with an arrow and drags his body to the palace of Prince Vladimir.

=== III. The Palace of Prince Vladimir ===
Allegro. Vladimir the Great of Kiev holds a great feast, at which Ilya decapitates Solovei.

=== IV. The Feats of Valor and the Petrification of Ilya Muromets ===
Allegro tumultuoso – Tranquillo – Maestoso solemne – Andante sostenuto. Ilya defeats Batygha the Wicked and his army of pagans in a great battle. Ilya and his bogatyrs later encounter two heavenly warriors who multiply each time they are killed; pushed to retreat, Ilya and his men are transformed into stone. This movement quotes Taneyev's cantata "John of Damascus" Op. 1 quite frequently.

== Instrumentation ==
The symphony calls for piccolo, 3 flutes, 3 oboes, cor anglais, 3 clarinets, bass clarinet, 3 bassoons, contrabassoon, 8 horns, 4 trumpets, 4 trombones, tuba, percussion (timpani, triangle, glockenspiel, snare drum, bass drum, gong, and cymbals), celesta, 2 harps, and strings.

== Recordings ==
The work was a favorite of Leopold Stokowski, who recorded it three times. In 1952 Hermann Scherchen recorded the complete work with the Vienna State Opera Orchestra for Westminster Records.

Some recordings have significant cuts in the last movement. Other recordings are:

- Downes, Sir Edward; BBC Philharmonic
- Faletta, JoAnn; Buffalo Philharmonic Orchestra
- Farberman, Harold; Royal Philharmonic Orchestra
- Feltz, Gabriel; Belgrade Philharmonic
- Fricsay, Ferenc; RIAS Symphonie-Orchester Berlin
- Johanos, Donald; Czecho-Slovak Radio Symphony Orchestra
- Rakhlin, Nathan; Moscow Radio & Television Symphony Orchestra
- Botstein, Leon; London Symphony Orchestra

With significant cuts:

- Golovchin, Igor; USSR State Symphony Orchestra
- Ormandy, Eugene; Philadelphia Orchestra
- Rachmilovich, Jacques; St. Cecilia Academy Orchestra

It was also performed by John Barnett and the National Orchestral Association, Artur Rodziński with the New York Philharmonic, Charles Dutoit and the Montreal Symphony Orchestra, and Vassily Sinaisky and the BBC Philharmonic for the Proms.
