= Barbarians (play) =

- Written by: Maxim Gorky
- Original language: Russian
- Genre: Realistic drama
- Setting: The provincial town of Verkhopolye, early 1900s

Premiere
- Date premiered: 1906

Barbarians (Russian: Варвары, romanized: Varvary) is a 1906 play by Maxim Gorky. It was written in the summer of 1905 in Kuokkala and first published by the 1906 Znaniye Collection. It came out as a separate edition via the Ditz Publishers.

== Synopsis ==
The quiet life in Verkhpolye, a small provincial town, is disturbed by the arrival of the team of railroad constructors, among them engineers Cherkun and Tsyganov. The old order, set by the town's mayor Redozubov, had been described as 'patriarchal barbarism', but it soon becomes clear that the cynical, amoral newcomers who claim to be 'heralds of civilization', bring in nothing but barbarism again, even if in its modern version.

As a result, Nadezhda Monakhova, seduced and deceived by Cherkun, commits suicide, the local government official Drobyazgin, involved in embezzlement, has to leave the place, Redozubov's son Grisha falls victim to alcohol addiction. Lukin, a student, remains untouched by both kinds of barbarism, for he seems to know ways of resisting and fighting them.

== Production history ==
The play premiered in May 1906 at the provincial theatres, in Kursk, Ekaterinoslav and Lugansk. Later that year it was produced in Berlin. In 1907 it was staged in Saint Petersburg, by the Sovremenny and Novy Vasilyeostrovsky theatres.

In a 1907 letter to Nikolai Krasov, the director of the Petersburgski Theatre (where the play premiered on 4 February 1908) Gorky recommended Enemies for production, but added, that should Barbarians be chosen, "...The Monakhova character demands special attention. She sincerely believes in some kind of grandiose, fiery, pure love and in the hero who'd be worthy of such love."

A Soviet film Barbarians was made in 1953.
