= Ilya Muromets Waterfall =

Ilya Muromets Waterfall Rakkibetsu Waterfall
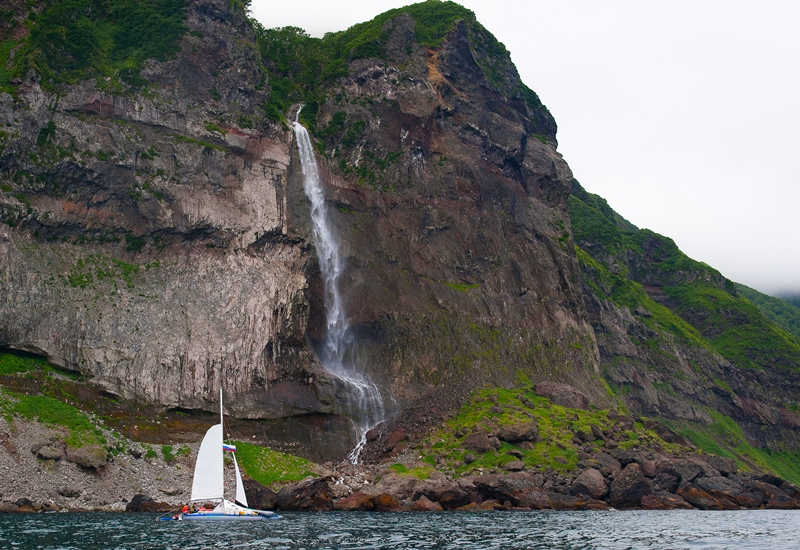

- Location within Sakhalin Oblast Location within Russia
- Interactive map of Ilya Muromets Waterfall Rakkibetsu Waterfall
- Location: Iturup Island (Kuril Islands)
- Coordinates: 45°31′00″N 148°53′20″E
- Type: Horsetail ribbon
- Total height: 459 feet (140 meters)
- Number of drops: 1?
- Watercourse: unnamed creek
- World height ranking: ≥652

Ilya Muromets (Илья Муромец), named after the East Slavic folk hero, is a very steep vertical waterfall on the Bear's Peninsula of Iturup, one of the largest Kuril Islands. Iturup has been the subject of a territorial dispute between Russia and Japan and also has a Japanese name, Rakkibetsu Waterfall (ラッキベツの滝). The water stream falls abruptly from the eastern slope of the Demon Volcano into the Pacific Ocean. Ilya Muromets is rarely seen by tourists, however, because it can be accessed only by boat.

External image
- Ilya Muromets Waterfall

== See also ==
- List of waterfalls
