= Treasure Island (1971 film) =

- Russian: Остров сокровищ
- Directed by: Yevgeni Fridman
- Written by: Edgar Dubrovsky; Yevgeni Fridman
- Based on: Treasure Island by Robert Louis Stevenson
- Starring: Boris Andreyev; Aare Laanemets
- Music by: Alexey Rybnikov
- Production company: Gorky Film Studio
- Release date: 1972
- Running time: 82 minutes
- Country: Soviet Union
- Language: Russian

Treasure Island (Russian: Остров сокровищ) is a 1972 Soviet adventure film directed by Yevgeni Fridman.

The elderly pirate Billy Bones settles in a tavern. Jim Hawkins finds in his chest a map of Treasure Island, collects a team and sets off on a journey.

== Plot ==
Young Jim Hawkins, dreaming of thrilling romantic adventures, comes into possession of an ancient sea chart pointing the way to the legendary pirate Captain Flint’s treasure. The hoard is hidden on a remote island lost in the ocean. Accompanied by Dr. Livesey, Squire Trelawney, and Captain Smollett, Jim joins the crew of the schooner Hispaniola as a cabin boy, setting sail on a perilous voyage. However, the ship's crew includes pirates who were once part of Captain Flint’s band, led by the cunning cook John Silver. Silver orchestrates a mutiny, forcing Smollett’s loyal crew to fight for survival.

Taking refuge on the island in Captain Flint’s old fort, Smollett, Trelawney, and Livesey fend off Silver’s assault, but the battle leaves the fort’s defenders wounded and outnumbered. Jim Hawkins bravely escapes the fort and maneuvers the Hispaniola to a safer location, killing the treacherous boatswain Israel Hands in self-defense. However, Jim is captured by the pirates, who take him along on their quest for the treasure. They soon walk into an ambush, losing two of their men while the rest flee. Smollett’s party secures the treasure and safely returns to Bristol, victorious in their adventure.

== Cast ==
- Boris Andreyev as Long John Silver
- Aare Laanemets as Jim Hawkins (voiced by Alexey Borzunov)
- Laimonas Noreika as Dr. David Livesey (voiced by Eduard Izotov)
- Algimantas Masiulis as Squire John Trelawney (voiced by Viktor Rozhdestvensky)
- Juozas Urmanavicius as Captain Alexander Smollett (voiced by Vladimir Druzhnikov)
- Igor Klass as Ben Gunn (voiced by Sergei Kurilov)
- Kazimieras Vitkus as Billy Bones (voiced by Anatoly Solovyov)
- Vladimir Grammatikov as Richard Joyce
- Antanas Pikelis as Israel Hands (voiced by Ivan Ryzhov)
- Vytautas Tomkus as George Merry (voiced by Leonid Markov)
- Andrei Fajt as Blind Pew (voiced by Mikhail Gluzsky)
- Lyudmila Shagalova as Mrs. Hawkins
