= Vassa Zheleznova (film) =

- Directed by: Leonid Lukov
- Written by: Maxim Gorky(play)
- Cinematography: Vladimir Rapoport
- Music by: Lev Shvarts
- Production company: Gorky Film Studios
- Release date: 19 November 1953
- Running time: 110 minutes
- Country: Soviet Union
- Language: Russian

Vassa Zheleznova or The Mistress is a 1953 Soviet drama film directed by Leonid Lukov and starring Vera Pashennaya, Mikhail Zharov and Nikolai Shamin. It is based on Maxim Gorky's 1910 play Vassa Zheleznova. Lukov also directed another Gorky adaptation Barbarians at the same year.

== Cast ==
- Vera Pashennaya as Vassa Zheleznova
- Mikhail Zharov as Prokhor Khrapov
- Nikolai Shamin as Sergei Zheleznov
- Valentina Yevstratova as Natalya
- Yekaterina Yelanskaya as Lyudmila
- Elizaveta Solodova as Rashel
- Varvara Obukhova as Secretary Anna Onoshenkova
- Leonid Titov
- Prov Sadovsky as Yevgeni Melnikov
- Konstantin Svetlov
- Gennadiy Sergeev
- Aleksandra Antonova as Maid Liza
- Elena Kuznetsova as Maid Polya

== Bibliography ==
- Rollberg, Peter. Historical Dictionary of Russian and Soviet Cinema. Scarecrow Press, 2008.
