= Stepan Kayukov =

Soviet actor (1898–1960)

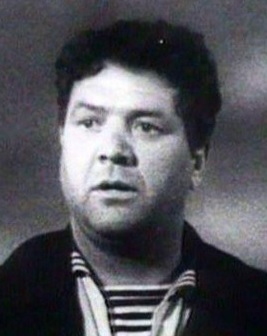
- Kayukov in 1938
- Born: Stepan Yakovlevich Kayukov; 1 August 1898; Saratov, Russian Empire
- Died: 22 January 1960 (aged 61); Moscow, RSFSR, Soviet Union
- Occupation: Actor
- Years active: 1915–1957

Stepan Yakovlevich Kayukov (Russian: Степан Яковлевич Каюков; 1 August 1898 – 22 January 1960) was a Soviet and Russian stage and film actor. People's Artist of the RSFSR (1949).

== Selected filmography ==
- Golden Mountains (1931) as worker
- Iudushka Golovlyov (1934) as Ignat
- Do I Love You? (1934) as Mr. Tushkanchik
- The Youth of Maxim (1935) as Dmitri Savchenko
- Engineer Goff (1935) as Ales
- Dubrovsky (1936) as Colonel (uncredited)
- Late for a Date (1936) as Fyodorov's colleague at the station (uncredited)
- Baltic Deputy (1937) as Metranpazh (uncredited)
- The Return of Maxim (1937)
- Marriage (1937) as Kochkaryov
- Miners (1937) as Loshadov
- Taiga Golden (1937) as Devil
- Man with a Gun (1938) as Andrei Dimov
- Mask (1938) as Egor Nikolaevich Pyatigorov
- Friends (1939) as Ingush Mussa
- The Vyborg Side (1939) as Dzhoma
- Tractor Drivers (1939) as Kirill Petrovich
- A Great Life (1939) as Usynin
- Gorky 3: My Universities (1940) as Semenov
- Fighting Film Collection 8 (1942) (segment 'Night over Belgrade')
- Magic Grain (1942) as Wind
- Alexander Parkhomenko (1942) as Lamychev
- Fighting Film Collection 11 (1942) as old man (segment 'The career of Lt. Gopp')
- The Prince and the Pauper (1942) as Water carrier
- Nasreddin in Bukhara (1943) as Bakhtiyar, vizir
- Ivan Nikulin: Russian Sailor (1945) as Papasha
- Hello Moscow! (1945) as Representative of the factory (uncredited)
- Sinegoria (1946) as King Fanfaron
- A Great Life 2 (1946) as Usynin
- Nasreddin's Adventures (1947) as Bezborodi [Russian prints] (voice)
- Lights over Russia (1947) as Trader
- First-Year Student (1948) as Ivan Sergeyevich
- Dream of a Cossack (1951) as Rubstov-Yennitsky
- Sadko (1953) as Neptune
- Did We Meet Somewhere Before (1953) as train station grocery seller
- Maksimka (1953) as Russian ship's officer
- The Wrestler and the Clown (1957) as Vanya, wrestling contest promoter
- New Adventures of Puss in Boots (1958) as Patisone (voice)
- Pardesi (1957) as Yevsey Ivanovich
- Over Tissa (1958) as Dzyuba
- Vasily Surikov (1959) as onlooker in Moscow
- People on the Bridge (1960) as Ilya Ilyich Khorkov (final film role)
