= Two Soldiers (1943 film) =

- Directed by: Leonid Lukov
- Written by: Yevgeni Gabrilovich; Lev Slavin (novel)
- Starring: Boris Andreyev; Mark Bernes
- Cinematography: Aleksandr Gintsburg
- Music by: Nikita Bogoslovsky Vladimir Agatov
- Production company: Tashkent studio
- Release date: 6 October 1943
- Running time: 80 minutes
- Country: USSR
- Language: Russian

Two Soldiers or Two Warriors (Russian: Два бойца, Dva boitsa) is a 1943 World War II film made in Tashkent (where the Soviet cinema industry had been evacuated) at the height of the Great Patriotic War. The film stars Boris Andreyev and Mark Bernes as two war buddies. The film was directed by Leonid Lukov.

The movie features two of Nikita Bogoslovsky's most famous songs, Dark Is the Night and Boatfuls of Mullet. Both were performed by Mark Bernes. His warm and sincere delivery of Dark Is the Night won the sympathy of millions of Soviet people, catapulting Bernes into enduring fame.

== Plot ==
1941 is a year of intense and heavy fighting on the Leningrad Front. Strong comradeship helps the soldiers endure the harsh moments of fierce battles. A deep bond of friendship forms between Arkady Dzyubin, a machine gunner from Odessa, and Sasha Svintsov, a steelworker from the Urals. However, one day, the friends have a serious falling out. After receiving a one-day leave, they go for a walk around Leningrad. Sasha, somewhat embarrassed, confesses to Arkady that he has an acquaintance in the city, a girl named Tasia, who has invited him to her home. Throughout the evening, while they are at Tasia’s place, Arkady never stops talking. He tells funny stories, jokes, and sings, while Sasha remains silent the whole time.

When Arkady and Sasha return late in the evening to their unit, they find that a fierce battle has taken place during their absence, and many of their comrades have been killed. To lift the soldiers' spirits, Arkady, with his usual wit, shares the story of Sasha's "unfortunate" love. Deeply hurt by his friend's joke, Sasha becomes angry, and they have a falling out. However, their quarrel does not last long. As the battle intensifies, Dzyubin defends a long-range firing point from the advancing enemy.

He successfully completes the mission but is severely wounded in the process. Risking his own life, Sasha carries his injured friend off the battlefield.

== Cast ==
- Mark Bernes as Arkady
- Boris Andreyev as Sasha
- Vera Shershnyova as Tasia
- Yanina Zheymo as Nurse (as Ya. Zhejmo)
- Maksim Shtraukh as Professor (as M. Shtraukh)
- Ivan Kuznetsov as Galanin (as I. Kuznetsov)
- Stepan Krylov as Maj. Rudoy (as S. Krylov)
- Lavrenti Masokha as Okulita (as L. Masokha)
