= Maksimka =

1953 film by Vladimir Braun

- Directed by: Vladimir Braun
- Written by: Grigori Koltunov; Konstantin Stanyukovich
- Starring: Tolya Bovykin; Boris Andreyev; Vyacheslav Tikhonov
- Cinematography: Aleksei Mishurin
- Music by: Vadim Gomolyaka; Ihor Shamo
- Production company: Kiev Film Studio
- Release date: 1953
- Running time: 67 minutes
- Country: Soviet Union
- Language: Russian

Maksimka or Maximka (Russian: Максимка) is a 1953 Soviet children's adventure film directed by Vladimir Braun and starring Tolya Bovykin, Boris Andreyev and Vyacheslav Tikhonov.

== Plot ==
In 1864, the Russian corvette Bogatyr encounters an American ship in the waters of the Atlantic Ocean. In the ship's hold, there is a cargo of enslaved Black people. Two days later, the sailors of Bogatyr rescue a young Black boy from the wreckage of an American ship destroyed in a storm. Terrified and beaten by the slave traders, the boy finds kindness and compassion in the Russian sailors. Soon, the boy, nicknamed Maksimka by the crew, becomes a favorite of the entire team. Among them, sailor Luchkin forms a particularly strong bond with Maksimka.

Luchkin’s love for the boy helps him overcome a deep sense of bitterness from an earlier injury caused by a cruel landowner. Through his attachment to Maksimka, Luchkin finds a renewed sense of purpose and meaning in life. In return, Maksimka shows his affection for his older Russian friend. He actively helps the crew of Bogatyr rescue Luchkin from captivity aboard an American ship, where labor recruiters had forcibly taken him. Due to his resourcefulness and courage in rescuing Luchkin, the captain of Bogatyr orders that Maksimka be officially enrolled in the corvette’s crew and is given the surname Bogatyryov. Thus, Maksimka becomes a young sailor of the Russian navy.

== Cast ==
- Tolya Bovykin as Maksimka
- Boris Andreyev as Seaman Luchkin
- Vyacheslav Tikhonov as Ship's Lt. Gorelov
- Emmanuil Geller as American slave runner
- Mikhail Astangov as Captain of the slave ship
- Aleksandr Kashperov as Richards (mate of slave ship)
- Nikolay Kryuchkov as Russian ship's bo'sun
- Sergei Kurilov as Russian ship's captain
- Stepan Kayukov as Russian ship's officer
- Vladimir Balashov as Russian ship's officer
- Pyotr Sobolevsky as Russian ship's navigator
- Mark Bernes as Russian ship's doctor
- Konstantin Sorokin as Russian ship's yeoman
- Nikolai Pishvanov as Russian sailor
- Andrei Sova as Russian sailor
- Mikhail Pugovkin as Russian sailor

== Bibliography ==
- Rollberg, Peter. Historical Dictionary of Russian and Soviet Cinema. Scarecrow Press, 2008.
