= Alexander Parkhomenko (film) =

1942 film

- Russian: Александр Пархоменко
- Directed by: Leonid Lukov
- Written by: Vsevolod Ivanov
- Starring: Aleksandr Khvylya; Nikolay Bogolyubov; Pyotr Aleynikov; Vera Shershnyova; Stepan Kayukov
- Cinematography: Aleksei Pankratyev
- Music by: Nikita Bogoslovskiy
- Production companies: Tashkent Film Studio, Kyiv Film Factory
- Release date: 1942
- Running time: 94 minutes
- Country: Soviet Union
- Language: Russian

Alexander Parkhomenko, (Russian: Александр Пархоменко) is a 1942 Soviet biographical drama film directed by Leonid Lukov based on Vsevolod Ivanov's novel "Parkhomenko" (1938). During the Khrushchev thaw in 1962, a new version of the film was released, in which all scenes featuring Stalin and all mentions of him were removed, and the role of Pyotr Aleynikov (Vasya Gaivoron) was partially re-dubbed by Gennady Dudnik.

== Plot ==
The film tells the story of the life of Alexander Parkhomenko, the commander who served in times of civil war, which goes to Tsaritsyn and there, leading the "Red" battalions, forcing the enemy to leave the city.

The portrayal of the actual participation of the Red army in Ukraine is questionable, as "the Red Army had never engaged the Germans, except for some minor skirmishes, let alone defeated them."

== Cast ==
- Aleksandr Khvylya as Aleksandr Parkhomenko (as A. Khvylya)
- Nikolay Bogolyubov as Kliment Voroshilov (as N. Bogolyubov)
- Pyotr Aleynikov as Vasya Gaivoron (as P. Aleynikov)
- Vera Shershnyova as Liza Lamycheva
- Stepan Kayukov as Terentiy Lamychev, Liza's father (as S. Kayukov)
- Tatiana Okunevskaya as Vera Bykova, Makhno's lover (as T. Okunevskaya)
- Boris Chirkov as Nestor Makhno (as B. Chirkov)
- Vasiliy Zaychikov as Kolokolov (as Vasili Zajchikov)
- Semyon Goldshtab as Joseph Stalin
- Ivan Novoseltsev as Bykov
- Yuri Lavrov as Anarchist (as Yu. Lavrov)
- Boris Andreyev as Anarchist (as B. Andreyev)
- Faina Ranevskaya as pianist
- Vladimir Osvetsimsky as Colonel (uncredited)
