= Barbarians (1953 film) =

1953 film by Leonid Lukov

- Directed by: Leonid Lukov; Ilya Sudakov; Konstantin Zubov
- Based on: Barbarians; 1906 play by Maxim Gorky
- Starring: Yevdokiya Turchaninova; Irina Likso; Vera Orlova
- Cinematography: Mikhail Kirillov; Vladimir Rapoport
- Production company: Gorky Film Studios
- Release date: July 17, 1953
- Running time: 179 minutes
- Country: Soviet Union
- Language: Russian

Barbarians (Russian: Варвары, romanized: Varvary) is a 1953 Soviet drama film directed by Leonid Lukov, Ilya Sudakov and Konstantin Zubov. It is based on Maxim Gorky's 1905 play of the same name.

== Cast ==
- Yevdokiya Turchaninova as Bogayevskaya
- Irina Likso as Lidiya
- Vera Orlova
- Evgeniy Velikhov as Monakhov
- Yelena Gogoleva as Monakhova
- Nikolai Annenkov as Cherkun
- Kseniya Tarasova
- Pavel Olenev
- Konstantin Zubov as Tsiganov
- Vladimir Golovin as Arkhip Fomich Pritykin
- Nikolai Shamin as Vasiliy Ivanovich Redozubov

== Bibliography ==
- Rollberg, Peter. Historical Dictionary of Russian and Soviet Cinema. Scarecrow Press, 2008.
