= Shukur Burkhanov =

Uzbek Soviet actor (1910-1987)

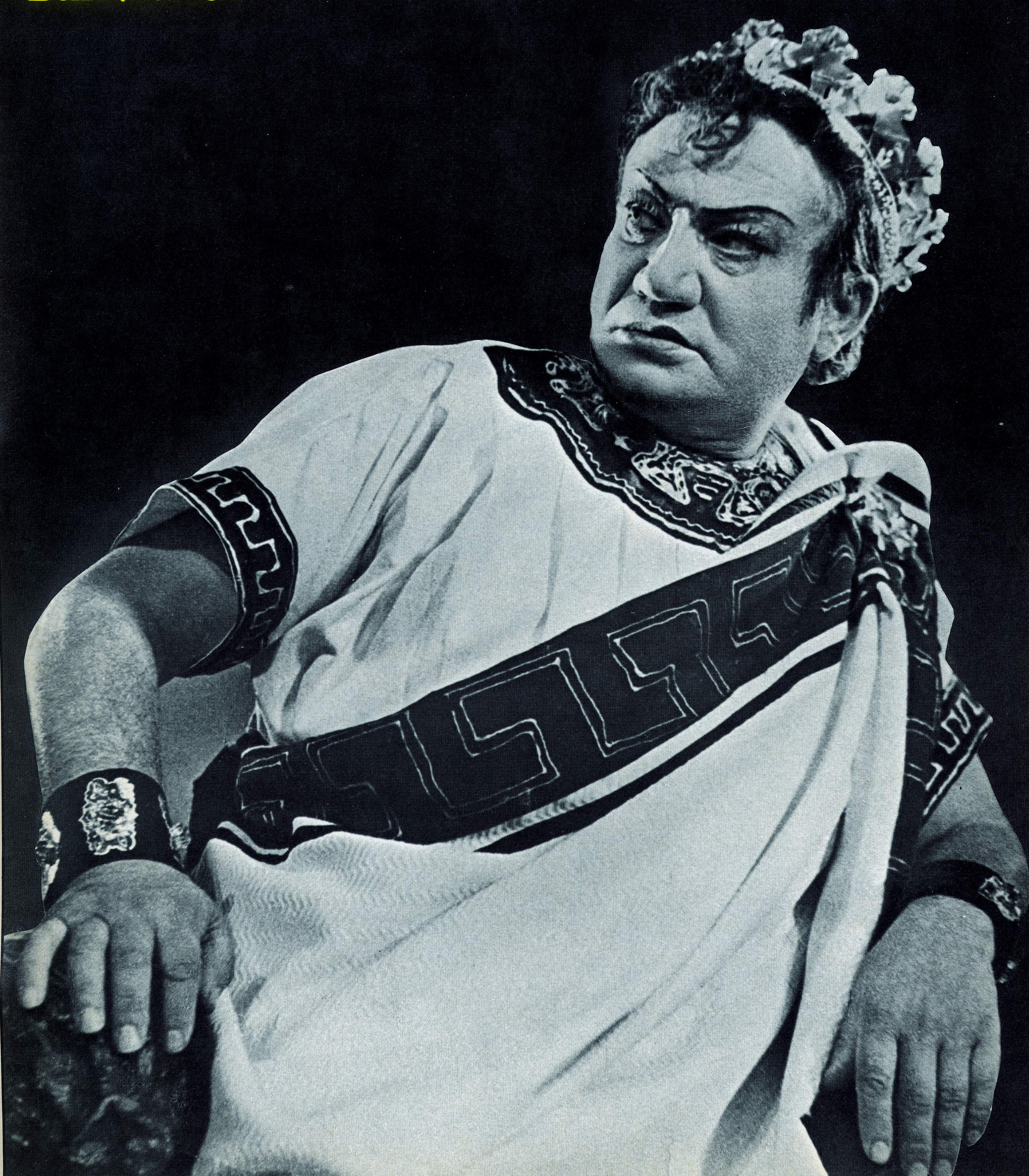
- Burkhanov c. 1983
- Born: September 15, 1910; Tashkent, Russian Empire (present-day Uzbekistan)
- Died: August 15, 1987 (aged 76); Tashkent, Uzbek SSR, Soviet Union
- Occupation: Actor

Shukur Burkhanov (Note: Uzbek: Shukur Burhonov; Russian: Шукур Бурханов, romanized: Shukur Burkhanov) (15 September 1910 – 15 August 1987) was a Soviet stage and film actor of Uzbek ethnicity. He is recognized as a People's Artist of the USSR.

Burkhanov was born and grew up in Tashkent (then part of the Russian Empire) in a strict Muslim family. In order to join the Uzbek drama theatre, which was founded in the 1920s, he had to leave home because his family's orthodox religious beliefs forbade acting.

At the time Uzbek theatre was still in its infancy. In 1930 he received training at the Moscow Art Theatre, which he credited as enabling him to play classic roles such as Romeo, Hamlet, and Oedipus.

Burkhanov was involved in Uzbek cinema from its very inception. The Uzbekfilm studio typecast him as a rebel who challenged the old order and traditions.

In the early 1970s he was the subject of a documentary, People's Artist Shukur Burkhanov, narrated by fellow actor Boris Andreyev.

== Awards ==
- Two Order of Lenin (18 March 1959 and 31 December 1970)
- Order of the October Revolution (1980)
- Three Order of the Red Banner of Labour (including 25 March 1945 and 16 January 1950)
- Order of the Badge of Honour (6 December 1951)
- People's Artist of the USSR (18 March 1959)
- State Hamza Prize (1964)
- Order of Outstanding Merit (22 August 2001)
