= Yuri Lavrov =

Soviet actor (1905–1980)

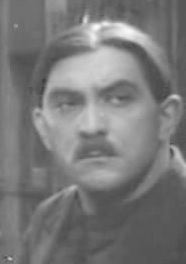
- Yuri Lavrov in 1939
- Born: Yuri Sergeevich Lavrov; March 14, 1905; St. Petersburg, Russian Empire
- Died: August 20, 1980 (aged 75); Kiev, Ukrainian SSR, Soviet Union
- Years active: 1919–1980
- Spouse: Olga Gudim-Levkovich (1924–1980)
- Awards: People's Artist of Ukraine

Yuri Sergeevich Lavrov (Russian: Ю́рий Серге́евич Лавро́в; March 14, 1905 – August 20, 1980) was a Russian and Soviet film and theatre actor. He was People's Artist of the USSR and People's Artist of Ukraine (1948).

== Biography ==
=== Childhood in St. Petersburg ===
He was born Yuri Sergeevich Lavrov on March 14, 1905, in St. Petersburg, Russia. He was baptized by the Russian Orthodox Church of St. Petersburg. His father, named Sergei Vasilyevich Lavrov, was Director of Gymnasium of the Imperial Humanitarian Society in St. Petersburg. Young Yuri Lavrov received an excellent private education before the Russian Revolution. His father emigrated to Belgrade after the Russian Revolution of 1917, and died there in 1934. Yuri Lavrov's mother, Elizaveta Akimovna, took a greater risk, as she refused to emigrate and stayed home in Petrograd with her children.

=== Acting career ===
In 1919, aged 14, Yuri Sergeevich Lavrov made his acting debut on stage of the Bolshoi Drama Theatre (BDT) in St. Petersburg. There his stage costumes were designed by none other than the legendary theatrical artist Alexandre Benois. Yui Lavrov also continued his acting studies. In 1924, he joined the troupe of "Molodoi Theatre of Leningrad" together with his fellow actress, Olga Gudim-Levkovich. That same year he married actress Olga Gudim-Levkovich and they lived on Ozerny Pereulok in the historic district of St. Petersburg. Their son, Kirill Lavrov was born in Leningrad and was baptized at the nearby church of St. John the Divine of Leushinsky Monastery. At that time Yuri Lavrov was a promising young actor and his future acting career looked bright. He made his film debut at Lenfilm studio in 1928, in Tretya molodost (1929) by director Vladimir Shmidtgof.

=== Under Stalin ===
In the 1930s Leningrad (St. Petersburg) was shocked by a series of high-level political murders and Great Purges under the dictatorship of Joseph Stalin. In 1934, the popular governor of Leningrad, Sergei Kirov was brutally murdered in his office. Joseph Stalin targeted Leningrad for the purpose of degrading the superior reputation of the former Russian capital by destruction of its culture and society through extermination of intellectuals. Soon the director of Bolshoi Drama Theatre (BDT, ru:Большой драматический театр имени Г. А. Товстоногова) Aleksei Dikij was arrested and imprisoned. After the most dangerous year of 1937, the family of Lavrovs managed to escape from Leningrad amidst the heat of the Stalinist repressions. Yuri Lavrov and his family were at risk, because of his father's Imperial past and emigration with the White Russians. In 1938, Yuri Lavrov moved from Leningrad to Kiev. There he became a permanent member of the troupe at Kiev State Russian Drama Theatre named after Lesia Ukrainka.

=== War ===
During the Second World War Yuri Lavrov and his family was evacuated with the theatre to Kirov, then to Novosibirsk in Siberia. There he continued his acting career, until the end of the Second World War. In 1944, Yuri Lavrov returned to Kiev with the Kiev Theatre of Russian Drama named after Lesya Ukrainka. In 1942 he played a supporting role in film Alexander Parkhomenko, which was made during evacuation at the Kiev Film Studio in Siberia.

=== Kiev ===
In 1944 Yuri Lavrov returned to Kiev. He eventually became one of the leading actors of the Kiev Theatre of Russian Drama named after Lesya Ukrainka. In 1950 Yuri Lavrov was joined by his son, Kirill Lavrov, who was discharged from the Red Army and became an actor. Father and son Lavrovs were involved in several stage productions together. The artistic director of Kiev Russian Drama, Konstantin Khokhlov was a good friend of both father and son Lavrovs. In 1955, Yuri Lavrov became a grandfather, as his grandson was born in Kiev. That same year, upon Khokhlov's invitation, his son, Kirill Lavrov left Kiev and returned to Leningrad to join the troupe of Bolshoi Drama Theatre (BDT). However, every year Yuri Lavrov and his wife were visited by their son, Kirill Lavrov, in Kiev.

=== Recognition ===
In Kiev, Yuri Lavrov resumed his film career. During the 1950s and 1960s, he played several supporting roles in films made at the Dovzhenko Film Studio. Yuri Lavrov remained among the leading actors in Kiev. In 1960 he was honored and designated People's Artist of the USSR, and also received awards and decorations for his achievements in film and on stage. Yuri Sergeevich Lavrov died on August 20, 1980, and was interred in Kiev, Ukraine.
