= Nightingale the Robber =

Character in Russian folklore

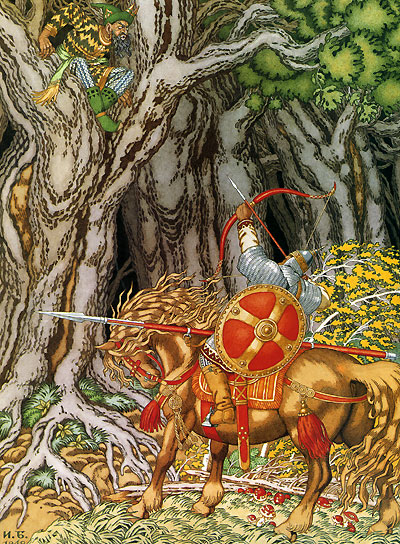
Ilya Muromets and Nightingale the Robber, by Ivan Bilibin.

Nightingale the Robber or Solovei the Brigand (Russian: Солове́й-Разбойник, romanized: Solovey-Razboynik), also known as Solovei Rakhmatich, is an epic robber who appears in traditional Russian byliny (folk poems).

== History ==
Pavel Ivanovich Melnikov discovered a version of the legend of Solovei in a 17th-century handwritten collection of stories and published it in the Russian newspaper he edited, Nizhegorodskie gubernskie vedomosti ('Nizhny Novgorod Government News'), in 1845 and 1847. In 1867, Melnikov wrote:

It [the story] still lives in people's memory and was found by us 20 years ago [...] in one of handwritten collection of stories of the 17th century. In the ancient times, where Nizhny Novgorod now stands, lived a famous and strong Mordvin, by name Skvorets ["Starling"]. He was the friend of another Mordvin — just as famous, just as strong — Solovei ["Nightingale"], the same Solovei who was connected with Il'ya Muromets.

The bylina concerning Nightingale the Robber is also called "The First Journey of Ilya Muromets", and is one of the most popular Russian epics, having been recorded 132 times. The monster Solovey had partial human and bird-like features, was able to fly, and lived in a nest, had a human family, and received drinks with his hands. He was said to live in a forest, and would sit in a tree and stun strangers with his powerful whistle. When Nightingale the Robber whistles, allegedly: "all the grasses and meadows become entangled, the azure flowers lose their petals, all the dark woods bend down to the earth, and all the people there lie dead!".

Legend states that Ilya Muromets survived the whistle, even though Nightingale leveled half of the surrounding forest. Ilya Muromets shot down Nightingale the Robber with arrows to the eye and temple, then dragged the defeated monster before Vladimir, the prince of Kiev. Vladimir wished to hear Nightingale the Robber whistle, but the creature claimed he was too wounded to whistle. Nightingale the Robber requested wine to drink so that his wounds would disappear, then he would whistle for the prince. When he whistled all of Vladimir's palaces were destroyed and many lay dead. After this, Ilya Muromets took Nightingale the Robber into an open field and cut off his head.

== Depictions ==
- Vladimir Toropchin's animated feature, Ilya Muromets and Nightingale the Robber, released on July 7, 2007.
- Aleksandr Ptushko's 1956 film Ilya Muromets as 'Wind Demon' in the English version.

== See also ==
- Zahhak

== Sources ==
- Bailey, James (1998). An Anthology of Russian Folk Epics. M. E. Sharpe. ISBN 978-0-7656-3080-3.
- Dixon-Kennedy, Mike (8 December 1998). "Nightingale". Encyclopedia of Russian and Slavic Myth and Legend. Bloomsbury Academic. p. 205. ISBN 978-1-57607-063-5.
