= Ilya Muromets (icebreaker) =

Ilya Muromets (Russian: Илья Муромец) may refer to one of the following icebreakers named after the Russian folk hero:

- Ilya Muromets, a 1915-built steam-powered icebreaker later captured by the French
- Ilya Muromets, a former German icebreaker Eisbär that was handed over to the Soviet Union as war reparations in 1946
- Ilya Muromets, a Dobrynya Nikitich-class icebreaker built in 1965
- Ilya Muromets, a Russian Navy icebreaker launched in 2016
