= Iturup =

Largest of the Kuril Islands

Disputed island Native name: Итуру́п (Russian); 択捉島 (Japanese); エトゥオロオㇷ゚ / エトゥオㇿオㇷ゚ (Ainu)
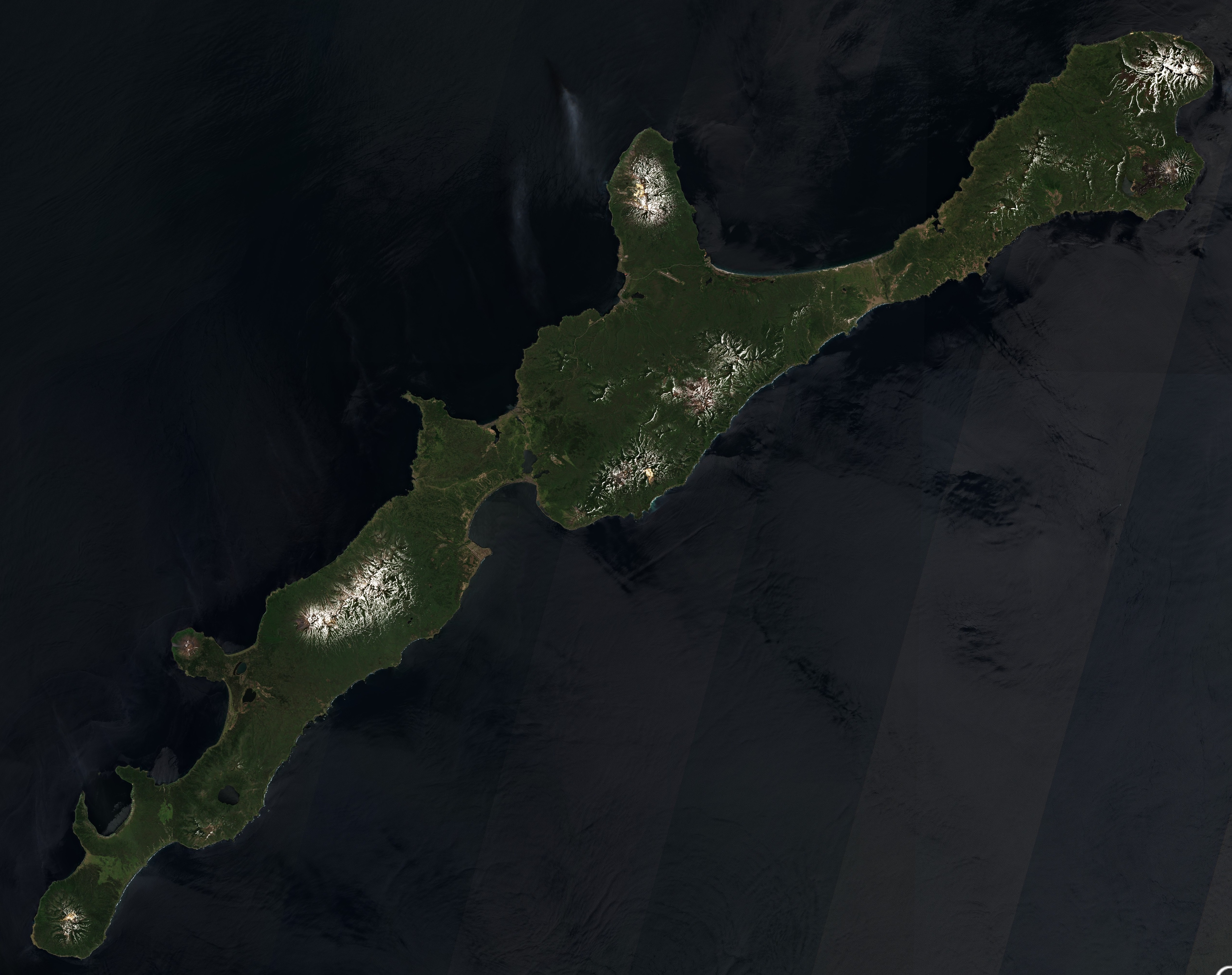
- Sentinel-2 image of Iturup (May 2023)

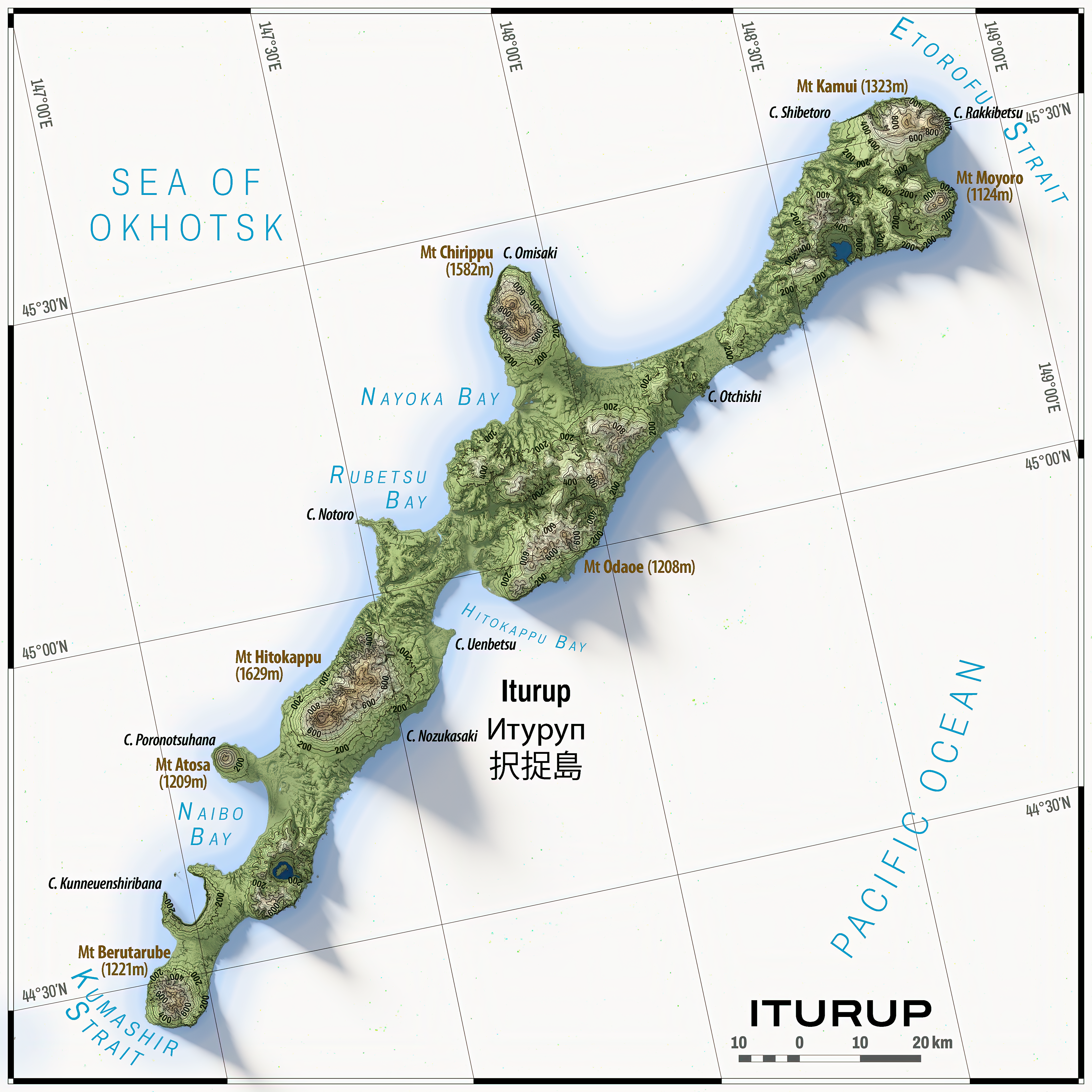

- Location within Russia Location within Japan
- Interactive map of Iturup
- Other names: Etuworop, Etorofu, Etrof

Geography
- Location: Sea of Okhotsk
- Coordinates: 45°02′N 147°37′E
- Archipelago: Kuril Islands
- Area: 3,139 km^{2} (1,212 sq mi)
- Length: 200 km (120 mi)
- Width: 27 km (16.8 mi)
- Highest elevation: 1,634 m (5361 ft)
- Highest point: Stokap

Administration
- Russia
- Federal subject: Sakhalin Oblast
- District: Kurilsky

Claimed by
- Japan
- Prefecture: Hokkaido
- Subprefecture: Nemuro

Demographics
- Population: 6,874 (2021)

Iturup (Russian: Итуру́п), known in Japan as Etorofu (Japanese: 択捉島, Hepburn: Etorofu-tō), is the largest of the Kuril Islands separating the Sea of Okhotsk from the North Pacific Ocean. It is the largest and northernmost of the southern Kurils, in far-east Russia. The island is claimed by Japan. It is located between Kunashir 19 km (12 mi) to its southwest and Urup 37 km (23 mi) to its northeast. The Vries Strait between Iturup and Urup forms the Miyabe Line dividing the predominant plants of the Kurils. The town of Kurilsk, the administrative center of Russia's Kurilsky District, is located roughly midway along Iturup's western shore. The 2021 Russian census recorded a population of 6,874 people.

The native inhabitants of the islands since at least the 14th century were the Ainu people. Various European explorers passed the area over the years but settlement varied between Russian and Japanese. The island was formally claimed as Japanese territory in 1855. Near the end of the Second World War in 1945, the Soviet Union occupied the southern Kurils and forcibly removed its Japanese residents. Japan continues to claim the islands and considers the northern edge of the island to be its own northernmost point.

== Names ==
The modern English name Iturup and earlier Yetorup are romanizations of the Russian name Iturúp (Итуру́п). It was previously known in English as Etrof from the Japanese name Etorofu-tō (択捉島). Both the Russian and Japanese names come from the Ainu language, but the exact words are uncertain. Two possibilities have been proposed: etu-oro-o-p (エトゥオロオㇷ゚), which means "place with a cape"; and etu-or-o-p (エトゥオㇿオㇷ゚, sometimes erroneously as エトゥオロㇷ゚), which means "runny nose" and may be a reference to a rock on the island that looks like a man with a runny nose.

== Geography ==
Iturup consists of volcanic massifs and mountain ridges. A series of a dozen calc-alkaline volcanoes running NE to SW form the backbone of the island, the highest being Stokap (1,634 m) in the central part of Iturup. The shores of the island are high and abrupt. The vegetation mostly consists of spruce, larch, pine, fir, and mixed deciduous forests with alder, lianas and Kuril bamboo underbrush. The mountains are covered with birch and Siberian Dwarf Pine scrub, herbaceous flowers (including Fragaria iturupensis, the Iturup strawberry) or bare rocks.

The island also contains some high waterfalls, such as the Ilya Muromets.

Rheniite, a rhenium sulfide mineral (ReS_{2}), was discovered in active hot fumaroles on Kudriavy volcano and first described in 2004. In the field it was originally mistaken for molybdenite.

== History ==
=== Prehistory ===
The native inhabitants of all the Kuril islands are the Ainu. They have lived there since at least the 14th century.

=== Edo period ===
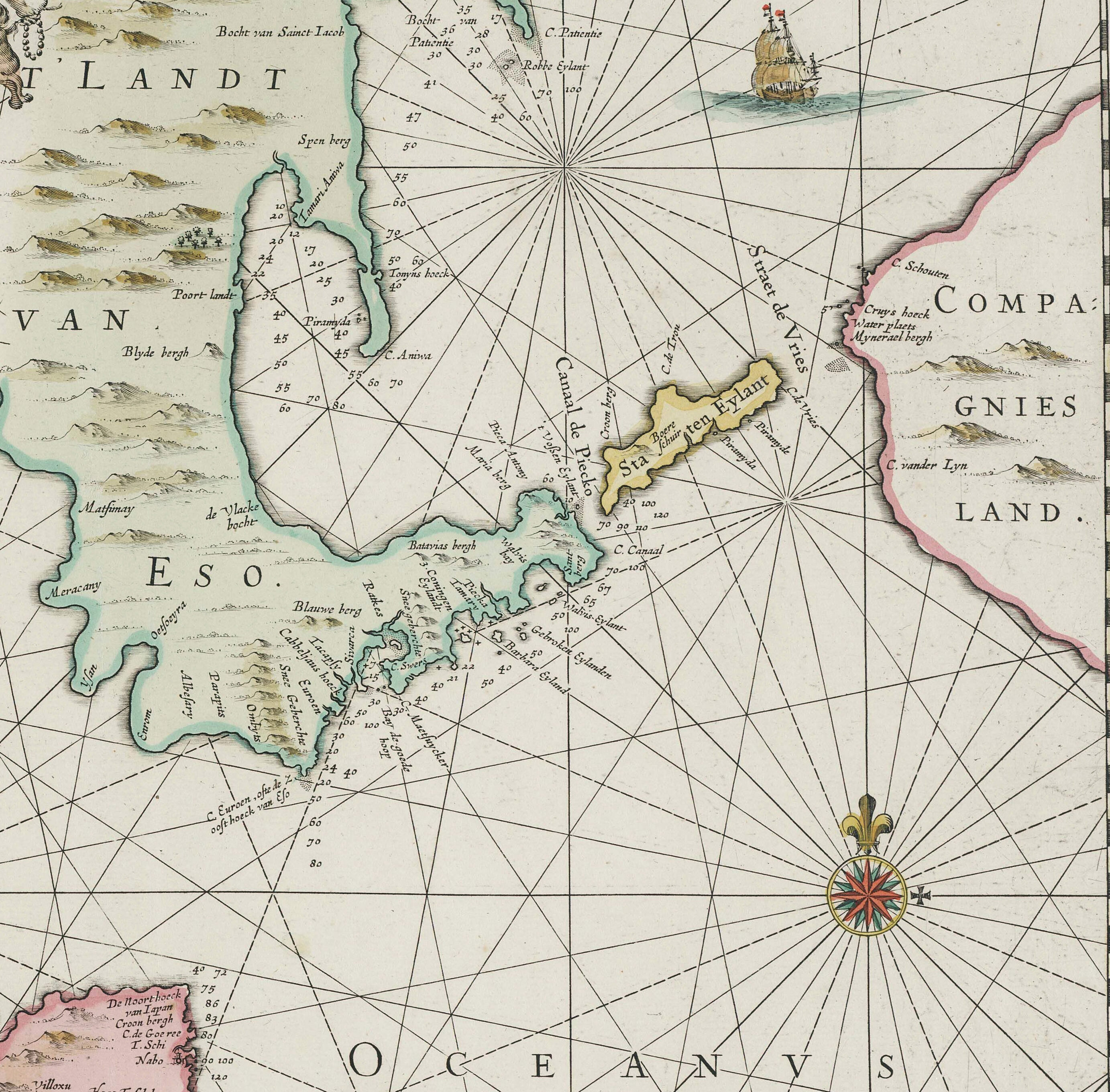
"Staten Eylant" between Hokkaido ("Eso") and the imaginary continent of "Companies Land" on Jan Janssonius's 1654 New and Accurate Description of Japan, the Land of Eso, and Adjacent Islands

Europeans are first recorded visiting this part of the Kurils in 1643 when the Castricum under Maarten Gerritsz Vries was exploring Hokkaido and the surrounding area for the Dutch East India Company (VOC). As with neighboring Urup, Iturup is sometimes said to have been the particular island intended in his account, but in fact his description of an enormous continental Company Land (named after the VOC) and a large and prosperous Staten Island (named after the States General) bear no relation to anything in the area, a fact established by Vitus Bering's lieutenant Martin Spanberg in a series of voyages in 1738, 1739, and 1742. The phantom Staten Island (Staten Eyland; French: Isle des États) still continued to appear on European maps for decades afterward, however, and is now sometimes specifically conflated with Iturup despite its placement on most maps more closely matching Kunashiri.

The Japanese are first recorded reaching Iturup in 1661, when Shichirobei and his company drifted there by accident. Following Bering and Spanberg's voyages under the Russian flag, a settlement was established in the late 18th century, prompting the Japanese to establish a garrison around 1800 at the site of present-day Kurilsk. Japanese rule over Iturup was formally recognized in the 1855 Treaty of Shimoda.

=== Meiji and Showa periods ===
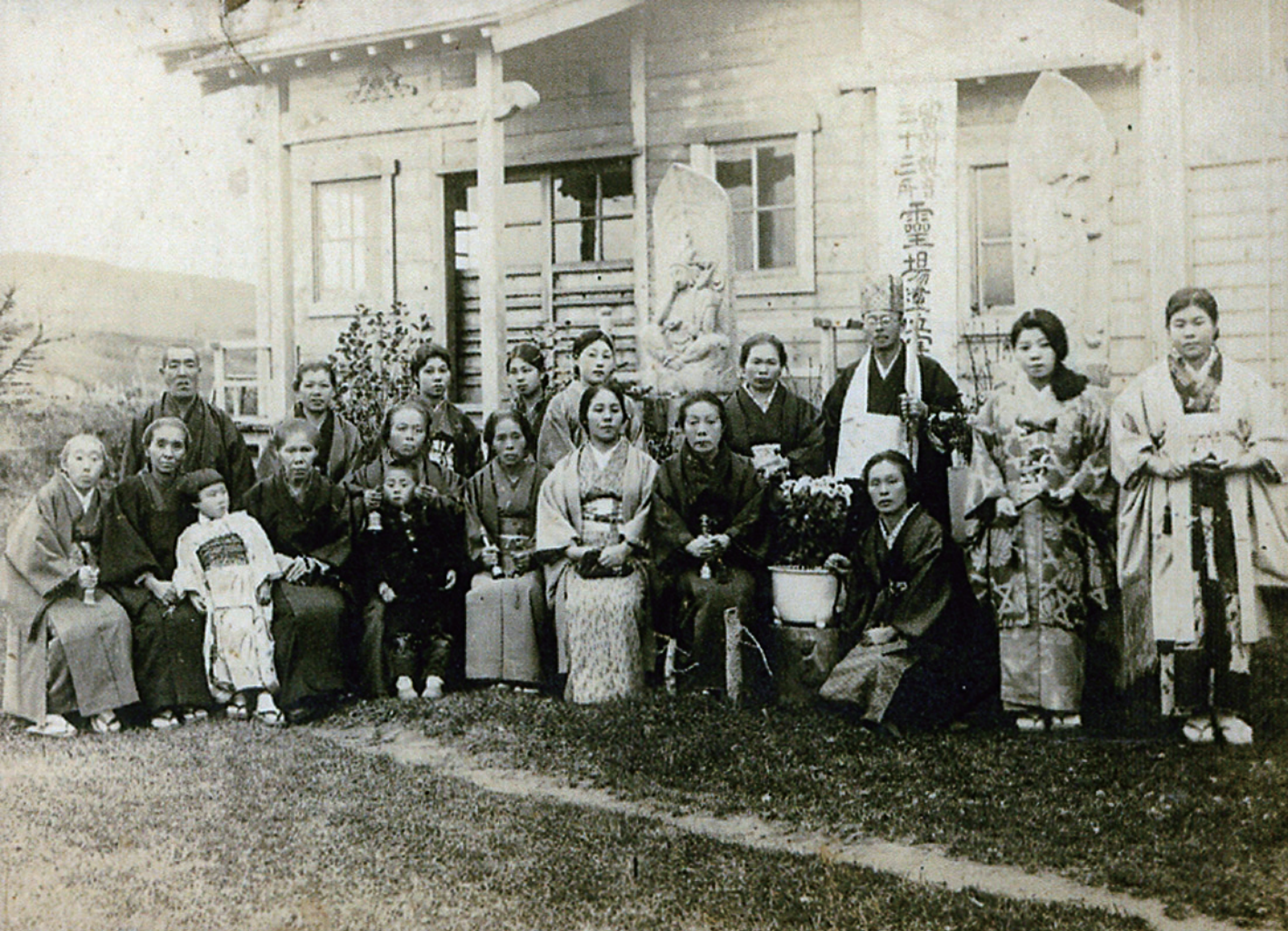
Japanese residents of Iturup at a Buddhist temple (before 1939)

In the early 20th century Etorofu had a cannery and fishing operations. Its only school was an elementary school. The people did not swim on the beach at all due to the temperatures.

On 26 November 1941, a Japanese carrier fleet left Hitokappu Bay (now called Kasatka Bay), on the eastern shore of Iturup, and sailed for an attack on the American base of Pearl Harbor.

Shana Village was located on Iturup (Etorofu) in the Showa era, before 1945. It was the administrative capital of the Kuril islands. There was a village hospital, an Etorofu Fisheries factory, a radio tower of the post office with a radio receiving antenna. The receiver was battery-powered.

=== Post-World War II ===
In 1945, according to decisions of the Yalta Conference, Iturup was occupied by the Soviet Union after Japan's defeat in World War II. The Japanese inhabitants were expelled to mainland Japan. In 1956, the two countries agreed to restore diplomatic relations, but a peace treaty, as of 2024, has not been concluded due to the disputed status of Iturup and some other nearby islands.

A Soviet Anti-Air Defense (PVO) airfield, Burevestnik (English: storm-petrel), is located on the island and was until 1993 home to a number of Mikoyan-Gurevich MiG-23 fighter jets. In 1968, Seaboard World Airlines Flight 253A was intercepted over the Kurils and forced to land at Burevestnik with 214 American troops bound for Vietnam. An older airfield, Vetrovoe, exists on the eastern part of the island and has been used by the Soviet Navy till 1991. Vetrovoye is no longer in use.

=== Contemporary period ===
A new international airport, Iturup Airport, was opened in 2014, 7 kilometres (4 1/2 miles) east of Kurilsk. It was the first airport built from scratch in Russia's post-Soviet history. It has a 2.3-kilometre-long (7,500 ft), 42-metre-wide (138 ft) runway and can receive Antonov An-74-200 aircraft. It also has a military use. The Burevestnik military airfield 60 km (37 mi) to the south, in the past received civilian aircraft as well, but was often closed because of fog. Burevestnik is now a reserve airfield for the new airport. On February 2, 2018, PBS NewsHour reported that Russia announced it was sending fighter planes to Iturup. Su-35 aircraft landed on a reserve airfield on the island in March 2018 and Su-35s were then deployed to Iturup airport on a trial basis in August 2018.

Administratively, the island belongs to the Sakhalin Oblast of the Russian Federation. Japan claims Iturup as part of Nemuro Subprefecture.

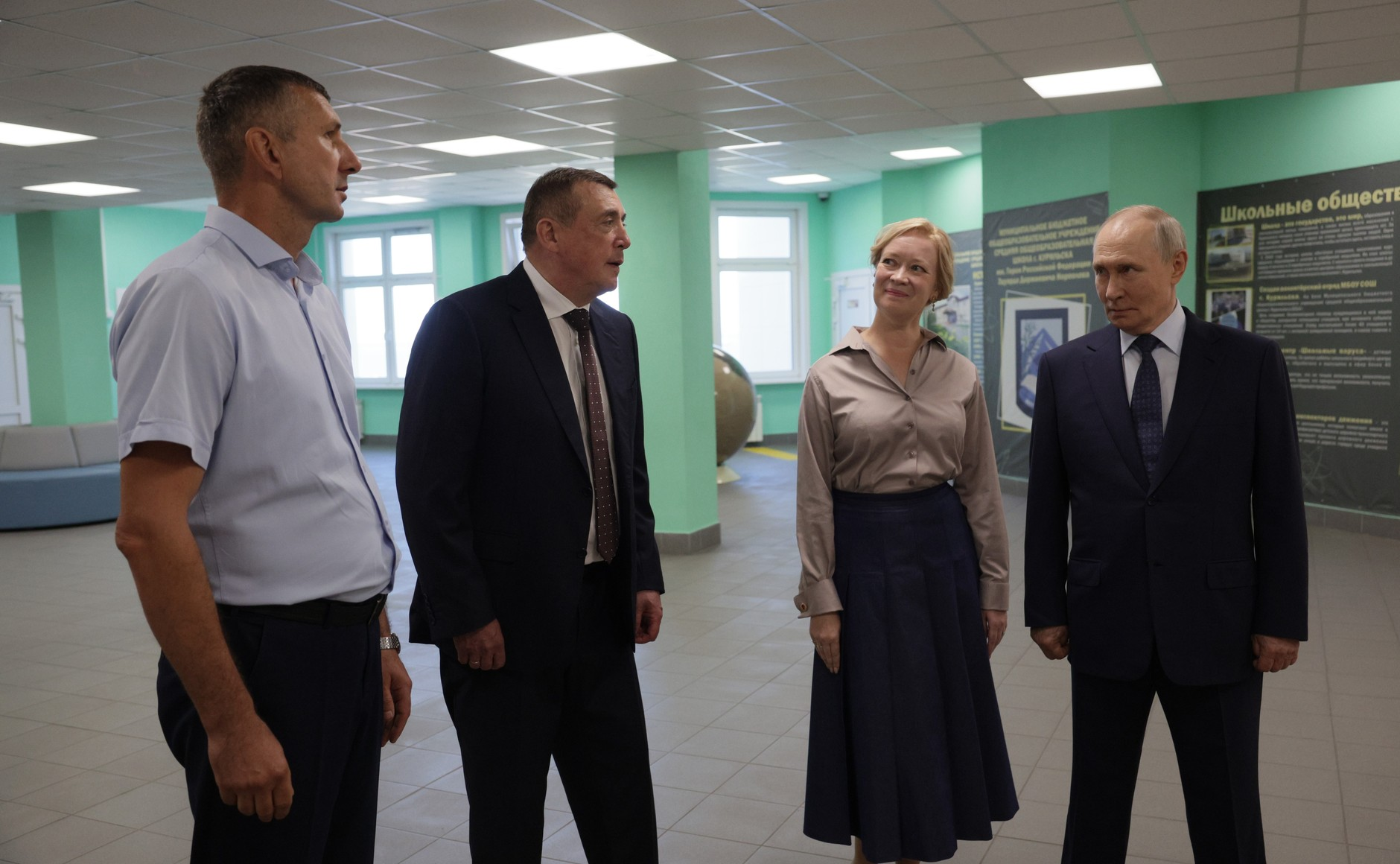
Vladimir Putin during his 2026 visit to Iturup

On 13 August 2026, Russian President Vladimir Putin toured a school, hospital, and fish-processing plant on Iturup, marking his first trip to the Kuril Islands. Japan's foreign ministry summoned the Russian ambassador and strongly protested the visit, while Japanese Prime Minister Sanae Takaichi stated the visit was "absolutely unacceptable" and had "worsened Japanese sentiment towards Russia". Putin and later the Russian foreign ministry rejected their Japanese counterparts' statements and Japan's claims to the southern Kurils, asserting that Russian sovereignty had already been settled by post-WWII agreements.

== Gallery ==
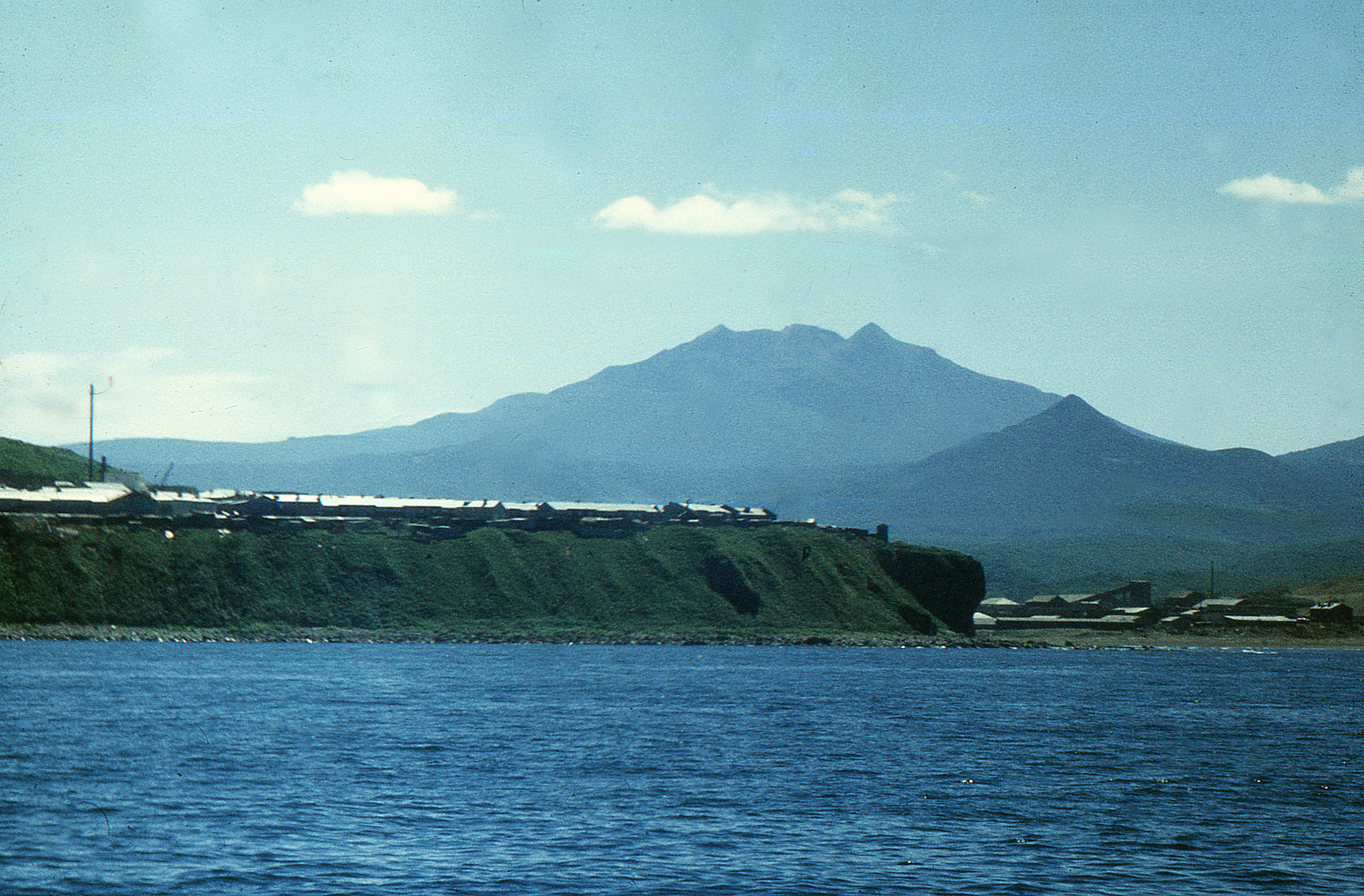
Volcanoes of Iturup

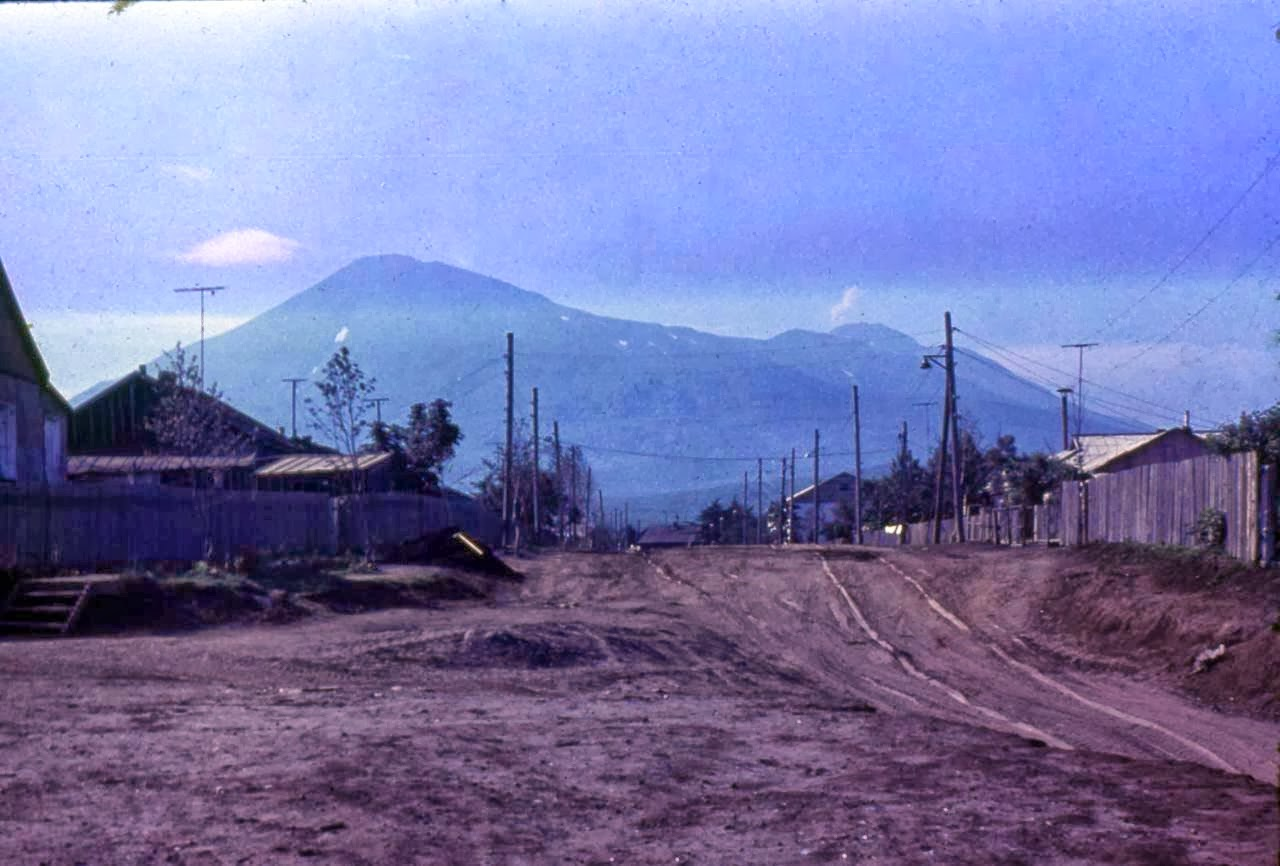
Kurilsk, 1981

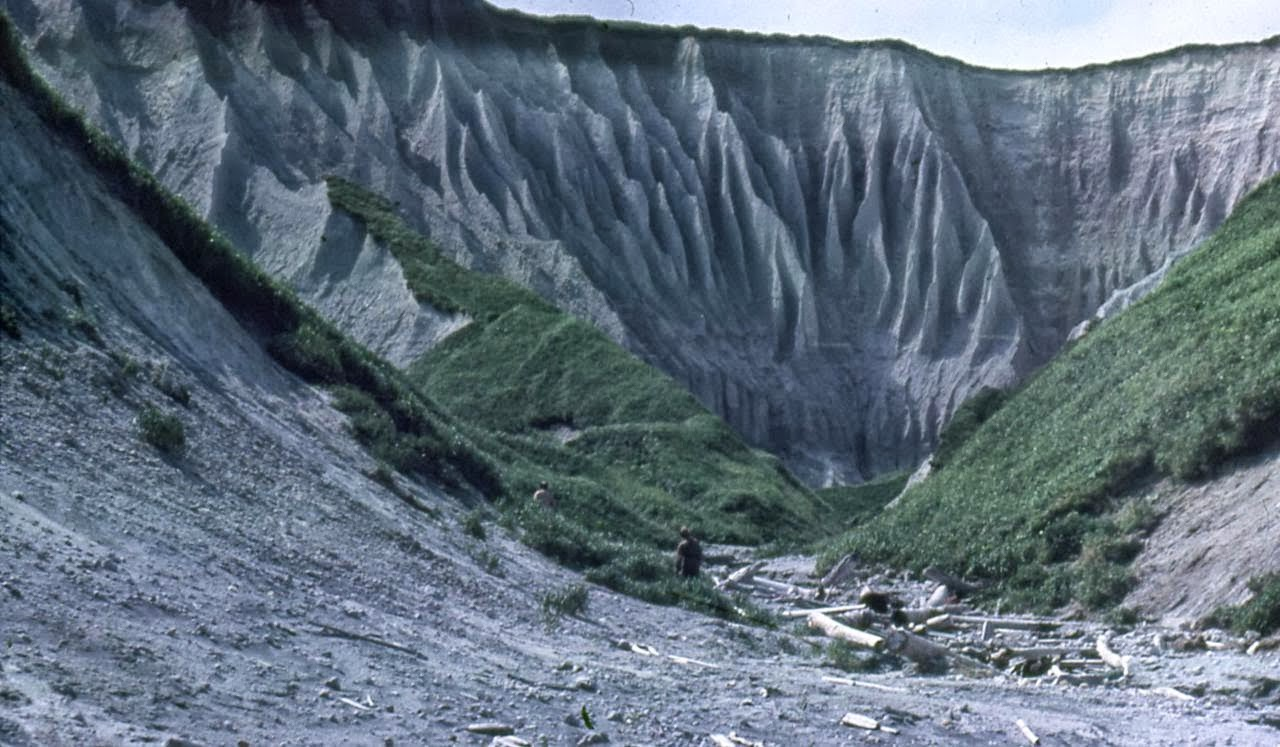
Iturup, 1981

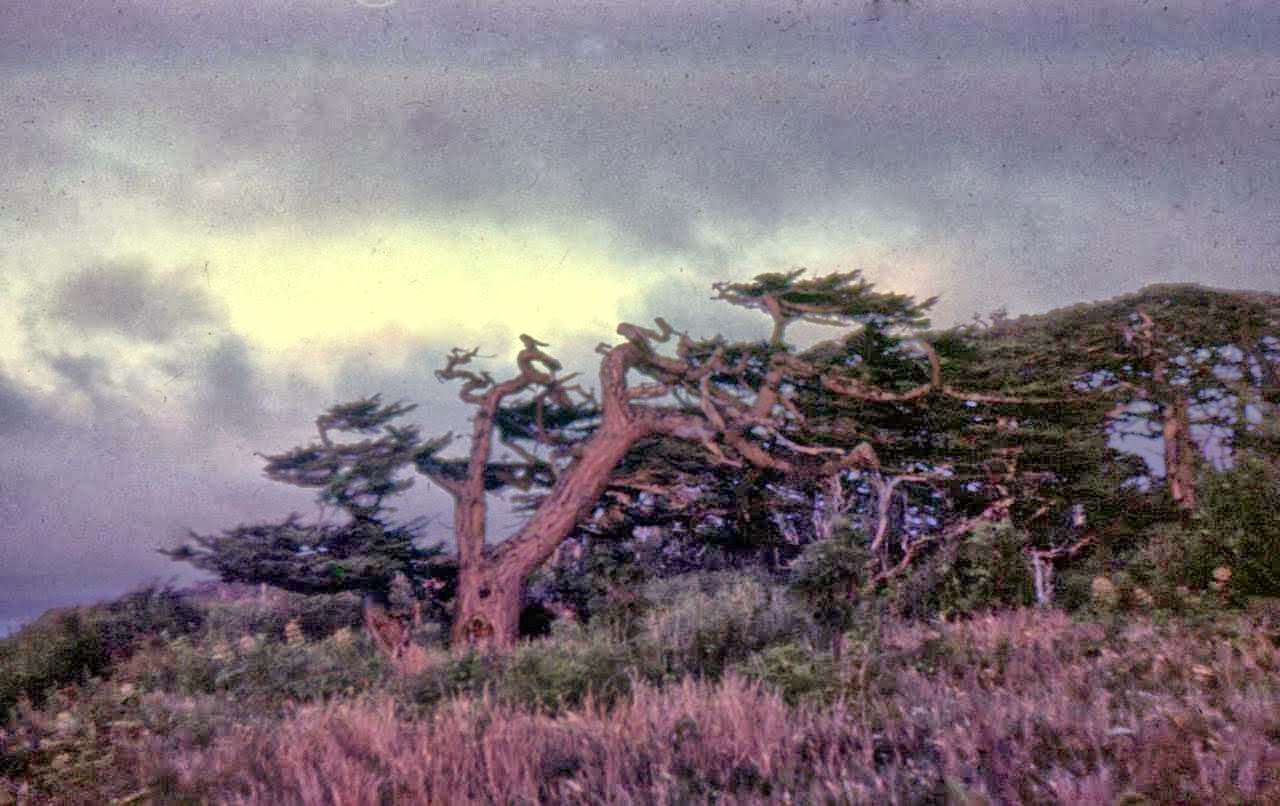
Trees showing effect of prevailing wind, 1981

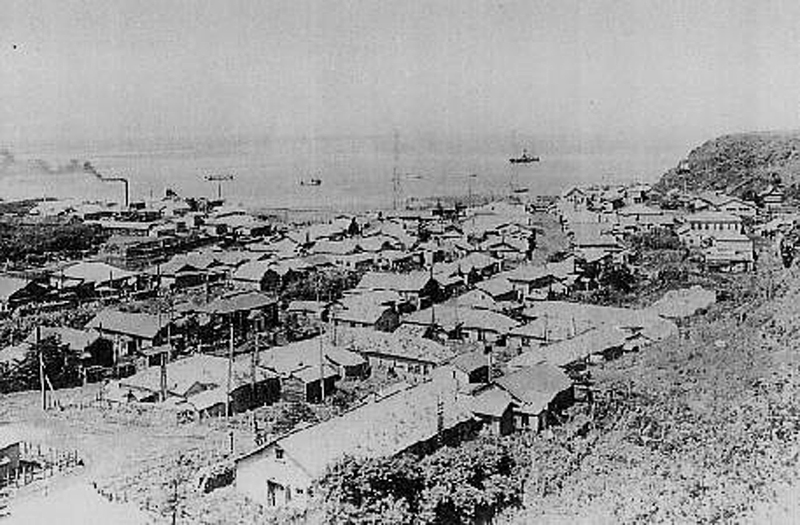
Shana Village in Etorofu (Shōwa period). There is a village hospital in the front, a factory in the left back with a fishery and a central radio tower (before 1945).

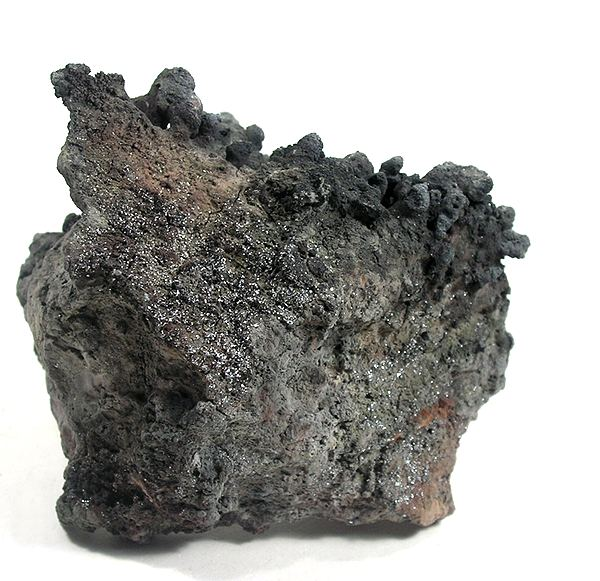
Rheniite crystals on a base of hardened lava, from Kudriavy Volcano

== See also ==
- Kuril Islands dispute
