= Golden Path (film) =

- Russian: Золотая тропа
- Directed by: Konstantine Pipinashvili
- Written by: Grigoriy Koltunov; Konstantine Pipinashvili
- Starring: Vladimir Chobur; Pyotr Sobolevsky; Andrey Fayt
- Cinematography: Feliks Vysotsky
- Music by: Ivane Gokieli; Aleksi Machavariani
- Release date: 1945
- Country: Soviet Union

Golden Path, (Russian: Золотая тропа) is a 1945 Soviet drama film directed by Konstantine Pipinashvili.

== Plot ==
Bandits kidnap caravans with gold and take them to China. The partisan detachment is to find a mine, which was hidden in the mountains.

== Starring ==
- Vladimir Chobur as Father and son Perekrestov (as V. Chobur)
- Pyotr Sobolevsky as Friet Ebing (as P. Sobolevski)
- Andrey Fayt as Fijngorst (as A. Fayt)
- Kote Daushvili as Shetman
- L. Romanov as Mironov
- Viktor Kulakov as Nikodimov
- Boris Andreyev as Epifanstev (as B. Andreev)
- Dimitri Mjavia as Professor (as D. Mjavya)
- Nikolay Gorlov as Gujinski
- Fyodor Ishchenko as Fisherman (as F. Ishchenko)
- Leonid Alekseev as Mitrich (as L. Alekseev)
- Sasha Chobur as Vasia
- Grigol Chechelashvili as Major (as G. Chechelashvili)
- Valodia Tsuladze
- Niko Gvaradze as Irot
- Leila Abashidze as Juta
