= Tarashcha uezd =

Tarashcha uezd Таращанскій уѣздъ
- Uezd
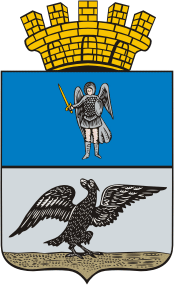
- Coat of arms

- Location in the Kiev Governorate
- Country: Russian Empire
- Krai: Southwestern
- Governorate: Kiev
- Established: 1800
- Abolished: 1923
- Capital: Tarashcha

Area
  - Total: 3,340 km^{2} (1,290 sq mi)

Population (1897)
  - Total: 245,752
  - Density: 73.6/km^{2} (191/sq mi)

The Tarashcha uezd (Russian: Таращанскій уѣздъ, romanized: Tarashchanskiy uyezd; Ukrainian: Таращанський повіт, romanized: Tarashchans'kyi povit) was one of the subdivisions of the Kiev Governorate of the Russian Empire. It was situated in the central part of the governorate. Its administrative centre was Tarashcha.

== Demographics ==
At the time of the Russian Empire Census of 1897, Tarashchansky Uyezd had a population of 245,752. Of these, 87.6% spoke Ukrainian, 9.4% Yiddish, 1.8% Polish, 1.0% Russian, 0.1% Tatar and 0.1% Belarusian as their native language.
