= Vassa Zheleznova (play) =

Play by Maxim Gorky

Vassa Zheleznova (Russian: Васса Железнова) is a play by Russian writer Maxim Gorky. He wrote and published the play in 1910. It was not performed until 5 July 1936 in Leningrad after Gorky wrote a new version in 1935.

The play was the basis of several films in the Soviet Union, e.g. the 1953 film of the same name, and in France and Germany.

In 2016, Emily Juniper presented a new version of the play at Southwark Playhouse set in 1990s Liverpool during a dock workers strike.

== See also ==
- Mother, 1906 novel by Gorky about revolutionary factory workers
