= Ilya Muromets =

East Slavic legendary hero

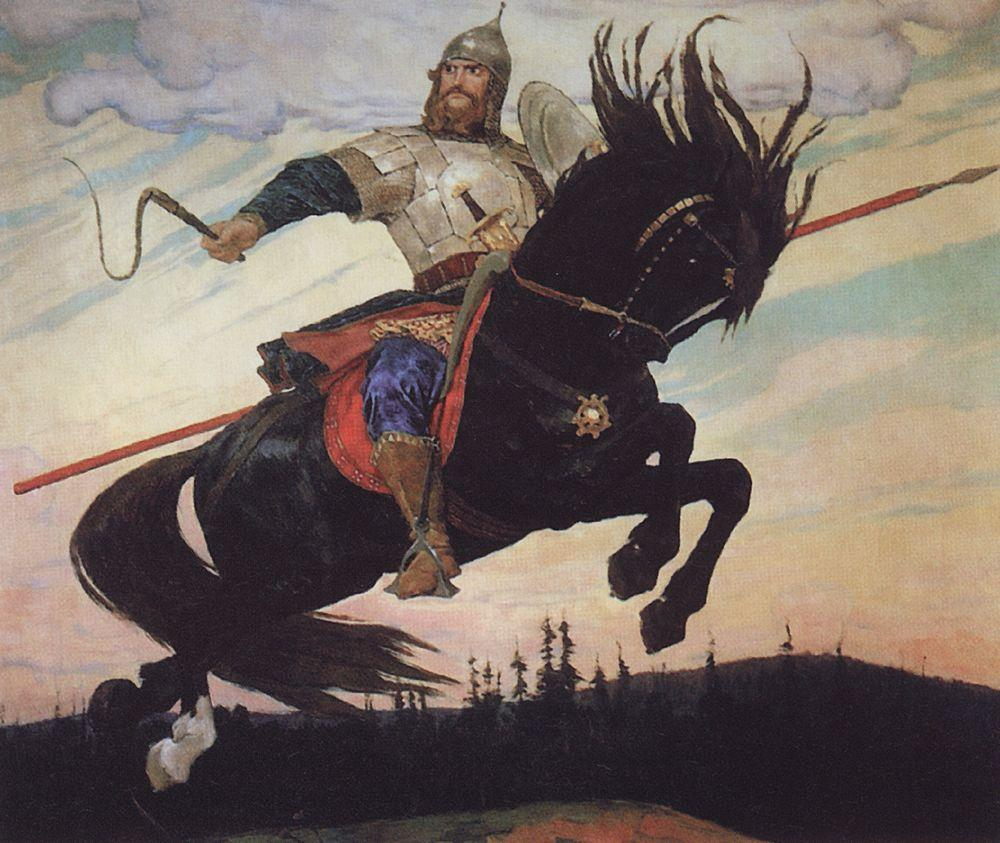
Ilya Muromets (1914) by Viktor Vasnetsov

Ilya Muromets or Murometz, (Note: Russian: Илья Муромец; Ukrainian: Ілля Муромець, romanized: Illia Muromets) also known as Ilya of Murom, is a bogatyr (hero) in a type of Russian oral epic poem called bylina set during the time of the Kievan Rus'. He is often featured alongside fellow bogatyrs Dobrynya Nikitich and Alyosha Popovich, the three collectively known in Russian culture as "the three bogatyrs".

Attempts have been made to identify a possible historical nucleus for the character. The main candidate is Ilya Pechersky, a 12th-century monk in the Kiev Pechersk Lavra who was canonized in 1643. His relics are preserved in the monastery.

== Ilya in byliny ==
Ilya Muromets is a major figure in byliny (pl. of bylina), a type of Russian epic folklore collected in the 18th and 19th centuries.

The son of a peasant, Ilya was born in the village of Karacharovo, near Murom. He suffered a serious illness in his youth and was unable to walk until the age of 33. He could only lie on a Russian stove, until he was miraculously healed by two pilgrims. He was then given superhuman strength by a dying knight, Svyatogor, and set out to liberate the city of Kiev from Idolishche and to serve Vladimir I of Kiev. Along the way, he single-handedly defended the city of Chernigov from nomadic invasion (possibly by the Polovtsi) and was offered knighthood by the local ruler, but Ilya declined to stay. In the forests of Bryansk, he then killed the forest-dwelling monster known as Nightingale the Robber (Solovei-Razboinik), who murdered travelers with his powerful whistle.

In Kiev, Ilya was made the chief bogatyr by Vladimir and he defended the country from numerous attacks originating in the Pontic–Caspian steppe, traditionally personified in epic as Kalin-tsar of the Tatars. Generous and simple-minded but also temperamental, Ilya once went on a rampage and destroyed all the church steeples in Kiev after Vladimir failed to invite him to a celebration. He was soon appeased when Vladimir sent for him.

== Ilya Pechersky ==
Some suggest that his prototype was Ilya Pechersky, a 12th-century monk in the Kiev Pechersk Lavra who was born in Karacharovo, near Murom, and canonized in 1643. According to hagiography, before taking his monastic vows, Ilya Pechersky was a warrior famous for his strength. His nickname was "Chobotok", meaning "(small) boot", given to him after an incident when Ilya Pechersky, caught by surprise, fought off enemies with only his boot.

According to another version, Ilya stemmed from modern-day Morivsk (earlier known as Moroveysk), a village halfway between Kyiv and Chernihiv (Chernigov) in modern-day Ukraine. It is supported by the notes of Erich Lassota von Steblau, who in 1594 visited the Pechersk Monastery and described the hero (bohater) buried there as "Elia Morowlin" - "Elijah of Morov".

In 1988, Soviet archeologists exhumed Ilya Pechersky's remains, which were stored in the monastery, and studied them. Their report suggested that at least some parts of the legend may be true: the man was tall, and his bones carried signs of spinal disease at early age and marks from numerous wounds, one of which was fatal.

== Legendary status ==
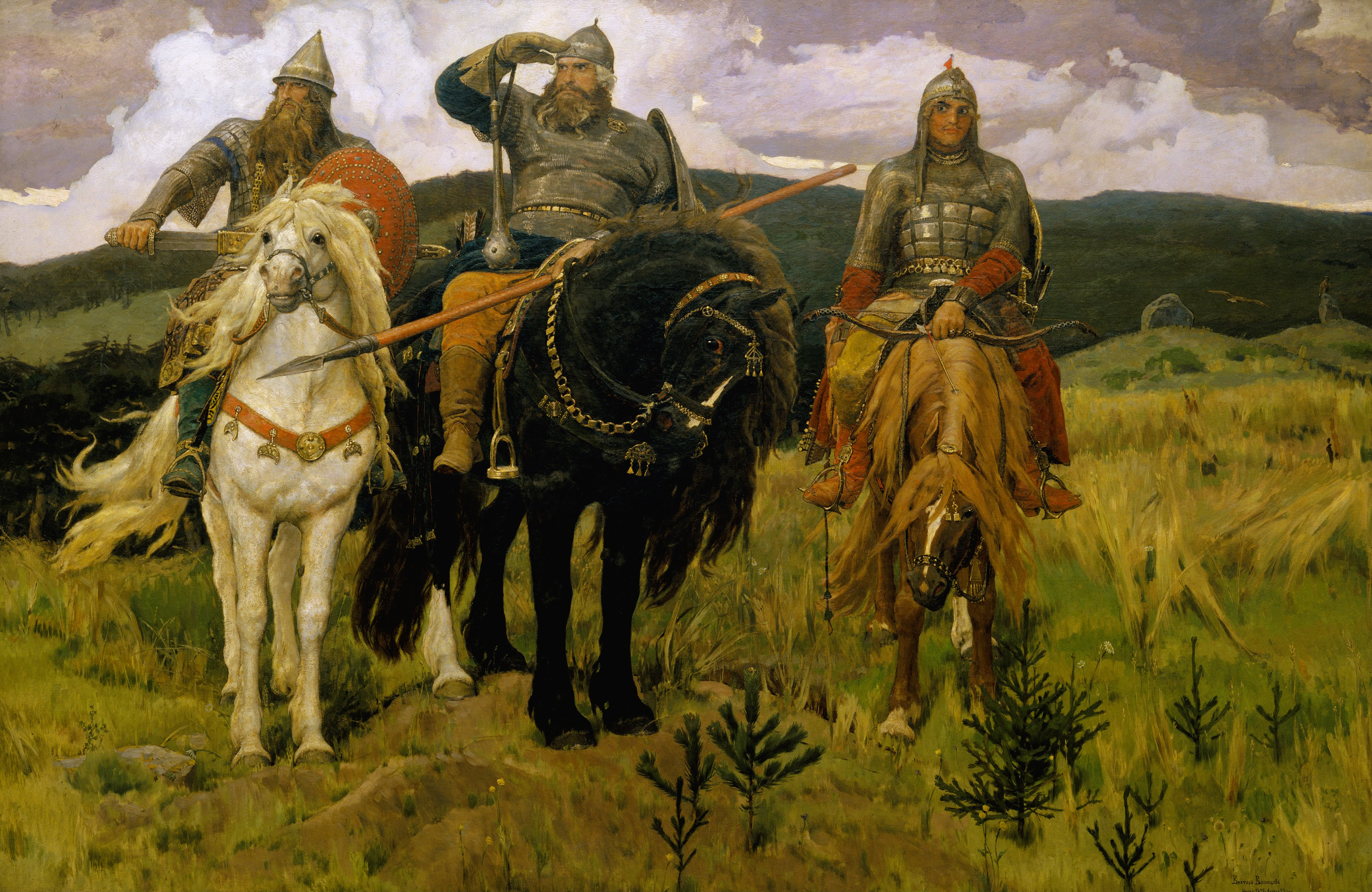
Bogatyrs (1898), a famous painting by Viktor Vasnetsov. Ilya Muromets is in the center, with Dobrynya Nikitich on the left, and Alyosha Popovich on the right.

His character probably does not represent a unique historical persona, but rather a fusion of multiple real or fictional heroes from vastly different epochs. Thus, Ilya supposedly served Vladimir I of Kiev (r. 980–1015); he fought Batu Khan, the founder of the Golden Horde (c. 1205 – c. 1255); he saved Constantine the God-Loving, the tsar of Constantinople, from a monster (there were a number of Byzantine emperors named Constantine, one of them a contemporary of Vladimir I, named Constantine VIII (r. 962–1028); it could also be a reference to Constantine VII Porphyrogennetos (r. 913–959), who encountered Olga of Kiev in the 950s; but the one emperor in Constantinople with this name most likely to be called "God-loving" was Constantine XI, r. 1449–1453).

== Analysis ==
The cycle of tales around Ilya Muromets (including the fight against villainous Nightingale the Robber and monster Idolishche) is classified under its own type in the East Slavic Folktale Classification (Russian: СУС, romanized: SUS): SUS -650C*, Russian: Илья Муромец, romanized: Ilya Muromets, closely placed with other tale types about strong heroes. The East Slavic Classification registers variants from Russian, Belarusian and Ukrainian sources.

== Depictions ==
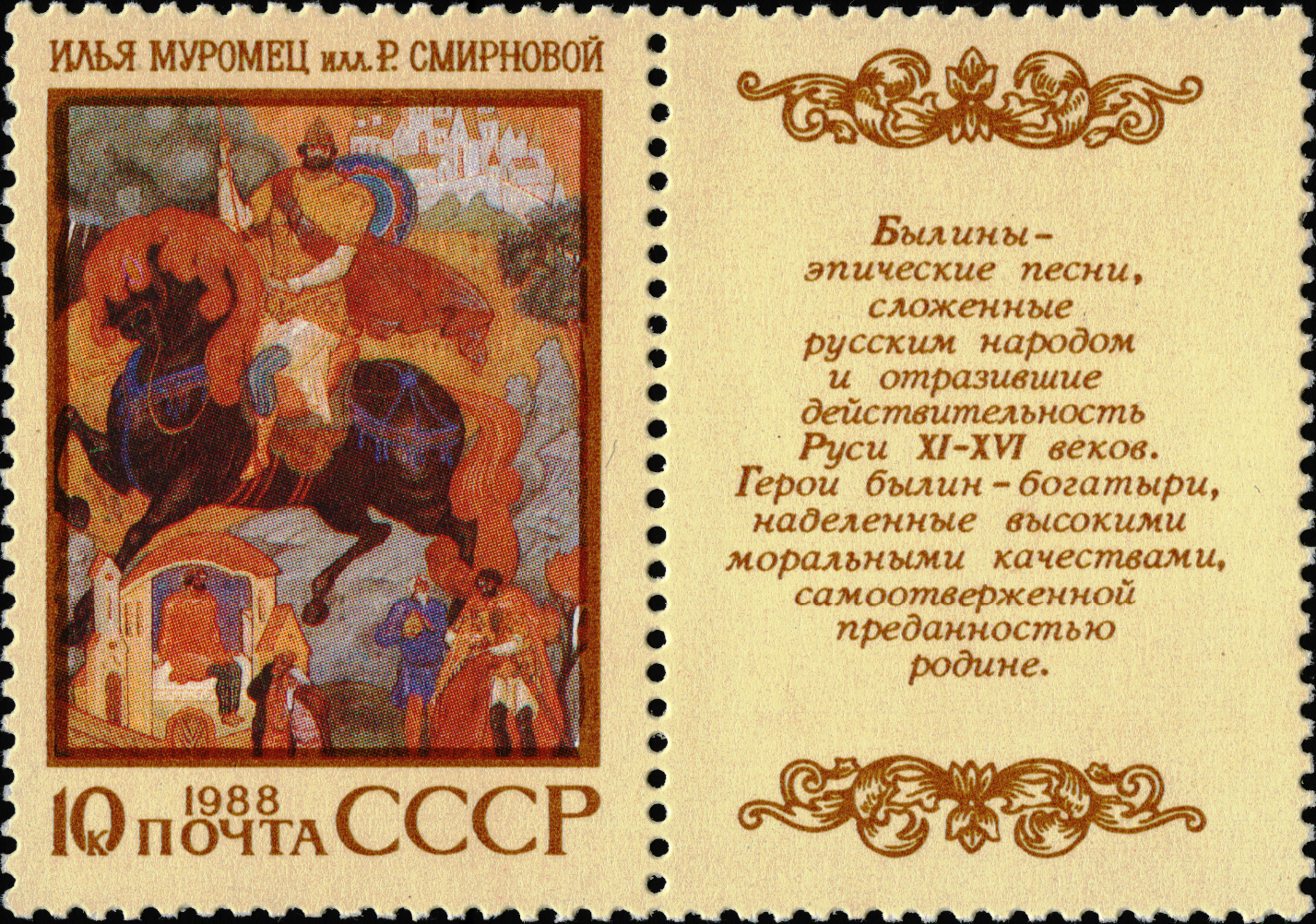
Soviet 1988 stamp dedicated to Ilya Muromets

- Catterino Cavos's 1807 opera Ilya Bogatyr (Ilya the Hero)
- Ilya features in the humorous tale Foma Berennikov from Alexander Afanasyev's Russian Fairy Tales, in which the main protagonist is Foma, while Alyosha Popovich and Ilya Muromets act as his sidekicks. Eventually Foma defeats the Chinese champion-warrior and the whole Chinese army by a sheer luck: "...And Foma Berennikov married the beautiful princess. Apparently, it's not only the bogatyrs who are lucky! The one who brags about himself the most gets the best."
- Viktor Vasnetsov's 1898 painting Bogatyrs (center figure).
- Nicholas Roerich's 1910 painting Ilya Muromets
- Reinhold Glière's 1911 Symphony No. 3 (Ilya Muromets) in B minor, op. 42
- Viktor Vasnetsov's 1914 painting Ilya Muromets.
- Aleksandr Ptushko's 1956 live action film Ilya Muromets (known in the U.S. as The Sword and the Dragon).
- Konstantin Vasilyev's 1974 and 1977 paintings.
- Ilya Muromets: the Prologue (1975) and Ilya Muromets and Nightingale the Robber (1978), a duology of animated shorts by Ivan Aksenchuk.
- Russian-French writer Antoine Volodine, writing under the pseudonym Elli Kronauer, reinvented the character in "Ilia Mouromietz et le rossignol brigand" (1999), the first of a series of books dedicated to the heroes of Russian byliny.
- Juraj Červenák's historic fiction Bohatýr trilogy (2006–2008).
- The Three Bogatyrs (2004–ongoing), an animated movie franchise by Melnitsa studio.
- Several icebreakers have been named Ilya Muromets
- Liz Williams's SF novel Nine Layers of Sky (2003) brings Ilya Muromets and Kyrgyz epic hero Manas to modern times.
