= Zmei (Russian folklore) =

Dragon or serpent in Russian mythology

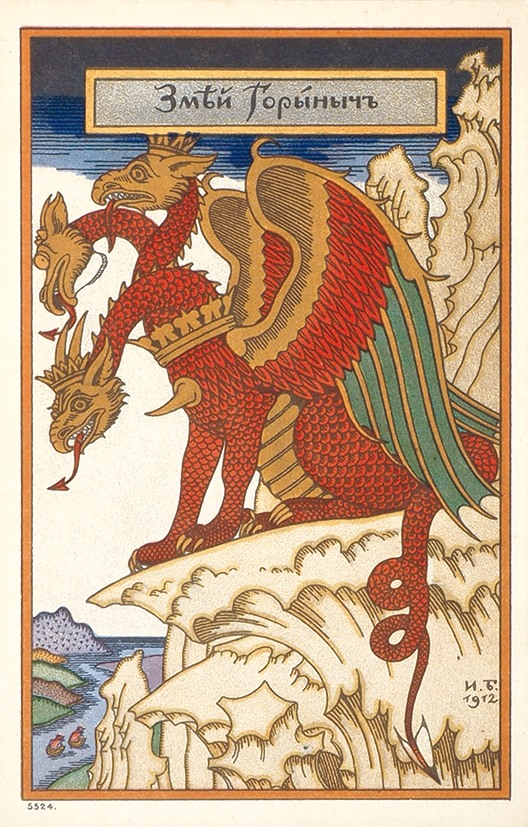
The three-headed dragon Zmei Gorynich (1912)

Zmei m. (Russian: змей, zmej) and zmeya f. (змея́, zmejá), meaning "serpent", is a form of dragon in Russian folktales and epic poetry; sometimes, a human-like character with dragon-like traits.

Two of the most famous zmei are Gorynych and Tugarin, two well-known zmei, appear as adversaries of the bogatyri (heroes) Dobrynya Nikitich or Alyosha Popovich.

== Etymology ==
The Russian masculine form zmei/zmey m. (Russian: змей, zmej) and feminine form zmeya f. (змея́, zmejá) means "serpent", which is the old word for dragon in most Indo-European languages; cf. 'dragon/drake' (from Ancient Greek: δράκων, drákōn, "big serpent"), wyvern (from Latin: vīpera, "viper"; cf. French: guivre), worm (from Old English: wyrm, "slithering legless animal"; cf. lindworm; Old High German: wurm, Old Norse: ormr, Old Finnish: käärme, "serpent/dragon"), etc.

Another form is zmiy (змий, zmij), borrowed from Church Slavonic: змии, zmii.

== Nomenclature ==
Despite meaning serpent, when referring to dragons, the term zmei always implicitly refers to the flying kind all over Russia. (Note: Belova, O. V. (2012a) Makhracheva (2012) and other sources, apud Kõiva & Boganeva (2020), pp. 389–390) (Note: Also among Ukrainians, Belarusians, Kõiva & Boganeva (2020), pp. 389–390 and among Estonian Russians, according to Fyodor Konyaev (1930s), ERA (Eesti Rahvaluule Arhiiv, Vene 2, 742 ('Estonian Folklore Archive, Russian') The Estonian Russian Archive; Vene 2, 742 apud Kõiva & Boganeva (2020), p. 389)

The "flying serpent" (змей летающий; zmei letayushchiy) and the "fiery serpent" (змей огненный; zmei ognennyi) are given separate entries, as pan-Slavic concepts in the "Slavic Antiquities: Ethnolinguistic Dictionary" published in Russian. In addition, there is also a Russian term for a kite, vozdushnyi zmei, not to be confused with all of the above.

Yet these two naturally share close similarities, for instance, they both assume serpent/dragon shape when airborne but human form on the ground, both are "mythological lovers" of women, and associated with meteorological phenomena, so the demarcation is not so clear. Other commentators refer to the former as "fiery flying serpent", (Note: For example, Antonov (2017).) so the distinction is not strictly observed.

== General traits and appearance ==
The creature's appearance is not described in older Russian epic ballads, but in more recent sources, the zmei is described as being covered with either green or red scales, and having iron claws.

=== Gender ===
The dragon in Russian folk fiction may be female, in which case she is called zmeya (змея́). The tendency is for the prose folktale versions to have male dragons, and the epic poetry to have the females. This will affect the behavior of the dragons. For instance, only the male dragons will capture or captivate a princess or a maiden as a love interest.

=== Multiheadedness ===
The zmei is often depicted with multiple heads, and the number of heads may be 3, 6, 9, or 12.

A three-, six-, nine-, and twelve-headed dragon are defeated on successive nights by the hero of the tale "Ivan the Peasant's Son and the Little Man the Size of a Finger" (Afanasyev #138). The twelve-headed one was hardest to kill, and although the hero beheaded it nearly completely, the last head had to be taken by six men provided to Ivan by the Tsar. (Note: A three-, six-, and twelve-headed are killed in "Ivan Popyalov" (Иван Попялов, No. 135))

==== Chudo-Iudo ====
In the variant "Ivan Bykovich (Ivan Buikovich)" (# 137), (Note: Variant to "Ivan Popyalov" (#135), in Ralston's discussion, strictly speaking.) an equivalent sets of these multi-headed creatures appear, but are not called zmei, but a Chudo-Iudo (Chudo-Yudo). These are humanlike creatures, each one is riding a horse. (Note: The twelve-headed Chudo-Yudo rides a horse with twelve silver wings, which is gold-maned and tailed) Even when decapitated, if the head is picked up it grows back on once a line is drawn on it with the dragon's fiery finger. As is pointed out below, a zmei can take human-form, and in the variant "Storm-bogatyr, Ivan the Cow's Son" (#136), the multi-headed Chudo-Iudo are described as using the word zmei also.

=== Shapeshifting ===
Akin to many dragons, like the Germanic dragon and Asian dragon, the zmei can shapeshift, and may turn into a handsome youth. In that form he enthralls the sister or wife of Ivan Tsarevich in different versions of "The Milk of Wild Beasts" (Afanasyev #204, #205), as described below. In one of these (#204) the zmei also transforms into kitchen implements to avoid detection: he becomes a broom, a sort of mop (помело pomelo) and oven fork. But Ivan's obedient animals are able to detect the presence of an intruder in these implements.

The zmei assumes the form of a golden goat in another tale ("The Crystal Mountain", Afanasyev #162).

== In fairy tales ==
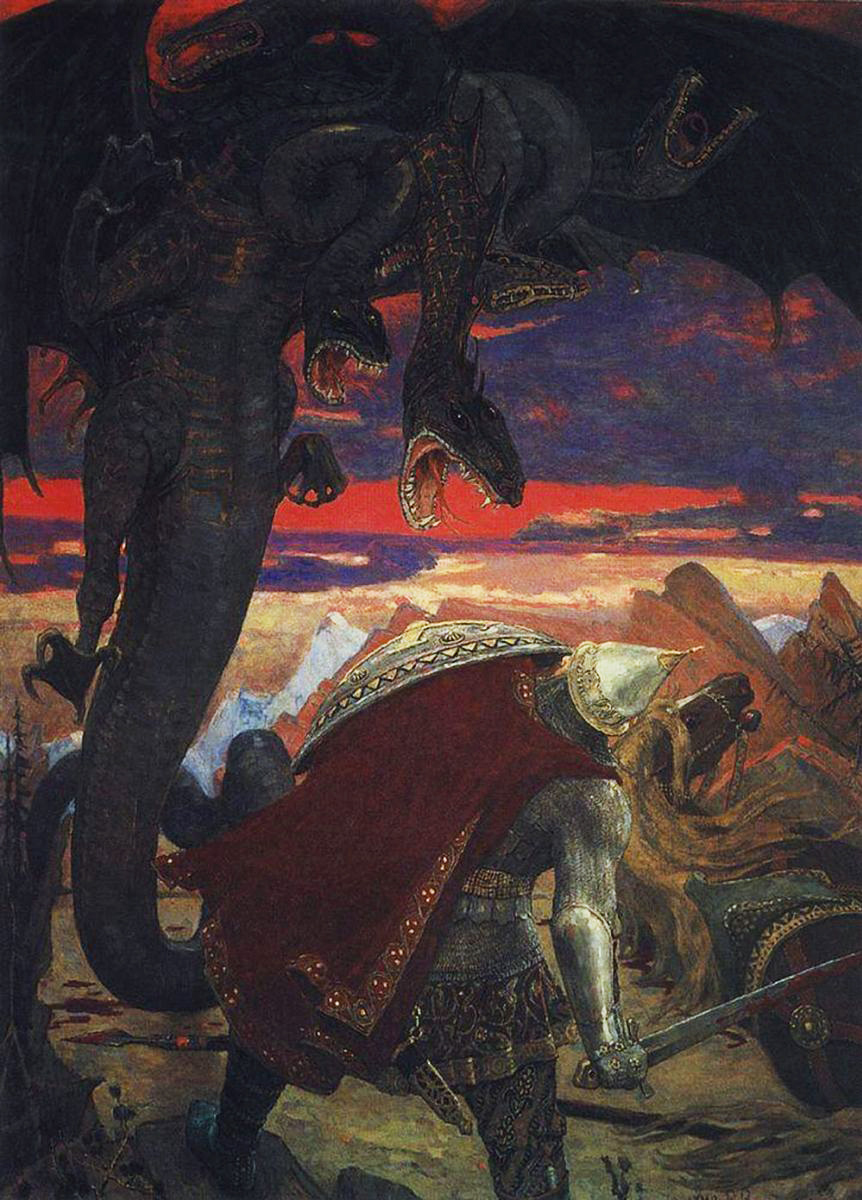
Zmey Gorynych, by Viktor Vasnetsov.

The zmei occurs in the literature of Russia and Ukraine in numerous wondertales (skazki (Note: Plural form of skazka ска́зка.)) such as those in Alexander Afanasyev's compilation Narodnye russkie skazki, and in the epic ballads, and rendered as "serpent" or "dragon". They may also appear as a character with "Zmei" or "Zmeyevich" (Zmeevich, etc.) in their proper name, and these may exhibit more human-like qualities, such as courting women.

=== As fabulous beast ===
The zmei slain by the bogatyr Dobrynya Nikitich in the epic ballad "Dobrynya and the Zmei" can be male or female. It may happen to be Zmei Gorynishche (Змей Горынчище) (Note: "Zmei Gorynchische" Змей Горынчище may be the correct transcription. The Cyrillic form is the one given by Stangé-Zhirovova.) ("Dragon, the Son of a Mountain"). This name is a variant form of "Zmei Gorynych" found in fairy tales. Or it may be she-dragon without a name, as in the epic ballad collected from Karelian Russia. The "Puchai River" was its haunt, but in the caves of the "Saracen Mountains" it raised its pups and kept hostages. It was capable of flight, and abducted a princess from Kiev by flying there.

==== Zmei Gorynych ====
Zmei Gorynych or Gorynich (Russian: Змей Горыныч, "the Serpent Gorynych") has decidedly dragon-like characteristics, such as having multiple heads (from 3 to upwards of 12), spitting fire, and being associated with a body of water. (Note: In contrast to Tugarin Zmeyevich, etc., who have "anthropomorphic traits" (Bailey & Ivanova (1998), p. 81).)

However, "Zmei Gorynych" is not consistently beast-like, and he may appear in the guise of a human thoroughout in some works (See §Milk of Wild Beasts, §Dobrynya and Marinka) below.

=== Anthropomorphism ===
Sometimes there are "Sons of Zmei" (Zmeyevich being their patronymic surname) who are recognized as monsters with human qualities, or vice versa.

==== Tugarin Zmeyevich ====
Tugarin Zmeyevich is one such with anthropomorphic characteristics. The half-human quality is borne out by the sobriquet zmei-bogatyr (serpent-hero) given him, and from him being able to ride a horse like a human being in the folktale "Alyosha Popovich". Tugarin thus faces off against the bogatyr Alyosha, and is slain.

Tugarin is a great glutton, which is suggestive of a dragon; however Tugar still retains human form, even in the scene where he displays the extraordinary feat of devouring a whole swan, moving it from cheek to cheek, and spitting out the bones. Tugarin also has flying wings like a dragon, but some songs rationalize these as paper wings, a device attached to the horse.

Tugarin is referred to as a pagan and he has been given overlays of a Tatar tyrant around the folkloric dragon. Some support the conjecture that Tugarin's name derives from "Tugar-Khan", or Tugor-Khan, of the Turkic Polovets, (Note: Tugar-Khan appears as the ruler of the fictitious "Tugars" in the 1956 film Ilya Muromets.) but this etymology has been discounted by later commentators. (Note: Discounted in favor of derivation that derives Tugar from tug meaning "grief".)

==== Milk of Wild Beasts ====
The zmei also transforms into a handsome youth to seduce women (folktale "The Milk of Wild Beasts", #204, 205). In one version, Zmei Gorynych seduces the sister of Ivan Tsarevich. She feigns illnesses and asks Ivan to perform the precarious task of retrieving the milk of the wolf, bear, and lioness. This plan fails. Later however, when Ivan is separated from his trusty pack of animals, zmei reveals his true nature and poises to devour him with his gaping mouth. (Note: There is a later development where Ivan vanquishes a 12-headed dragon, but is beheaded by a water-carrier who sought to steal credit.) In another version, Zmei Zmeyevich ("Serpent, Son of Serpent") and Ivan's adulterous wife play out a similar plot.

=== Other examples ===
Zmei Gorynych or Tugarin Zmeyevich, in "Dobrynya and Marinka", play fleeting roles as the lover of Marinka the sorceress, and are instantly killed.

In some tales, this Zmei Zmeyevich is a tsar.

== Other folktale literature ==
=== Eruslan Lazarevich ===
There is also the three-headed zmei defeated by Eruslan Lazarevich, hero of the story material found in popular print (lubki).

=== Saint George ===
It was a zmei, and not a drakon (Russian: драко́н) that was defeated by Saint George, or St. Egorii, as he was popularly known in Russia. The saint appears as "Egorii the brave" (Russian: Егорий Храбрый, with the epithet "chrabryii") in religious verses. This can be seen in popular lubok prints of Saint George and the Dragon in Russia. The scene is also often depicted in Russian icons.

== See also ==
- Gorynychus, a genus named after Zmey Gorynych
