= Tugarin =

Mythical creature

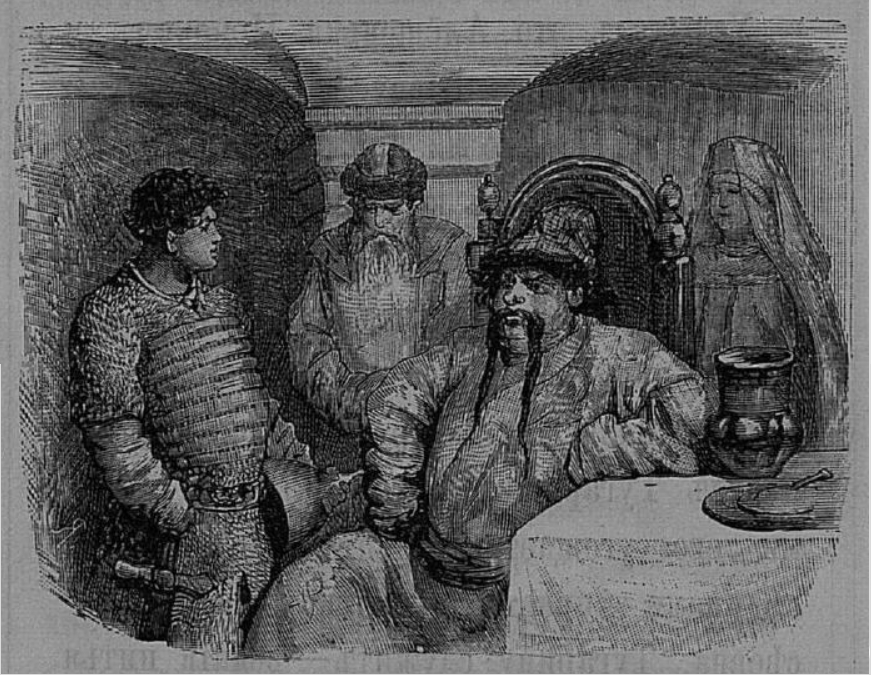
Alyosha Popovich and Tugarin, depiction by Klavdy Lebedev (1889)

Tugarin (Russian: Тугарин) is a mythical creature in Russian byliny and fairy tales, which personifies evil and cruelty and appears in a dragon-like form. Tugarin is depicted as a giant and an opponent of Alyosha Popovich.

== Name forms and origins ==
Tugarin has many different names in Russian byliny and fairy tales, such as Zmey Tugarin, Zmey Tugaretin, Zmeishche Tugarishche, and others.

The name Tugarin as a corruption of Tugar-Khan (Tugor-Khan of the Turkic Polovets), has been contested by an etymology from the root tug "grief". (Note: Related to verb tuzhit тужить "to grieve".) (Note: Каллаш, Этногр. Обозр., 1889, No 3, стр. 207, cited by Fasmer's Mythological Dictionary.)

== Description ==
Tugarin, although spoken of as a dragon, largely retains an "anthropomorphic" form, and is seen riding a horse. It appears he has wings with which to fly, and he soars to the air during the duel with Alyosha. The flying wings are certainly a dragon-like trait, but some versions explain it away as a contraption made of paper, attached to his horse and not to himself.

Tugarin was a great glutton, which is somewhat of a dragon-like trait. He could stuff a whole wheel of bread in each cheek, then deposit a whole swan on his tongue and swallow it. This is similarly but somewhat differently sung in some versions of byliny.

He had a huge head, and in some texts, his severed head rolled off like a beer cauldron, or it rolled off like an onion, later to be described as big enough to serve as a cauldron. (Note: Alyosha plays a game with it by tossing the head onto his spear. This is seenfby Alyosha's follower at a distance. In one version, the follower is called Marýshko, and he announces it is Alyosha playing with the "little head".)

The pagan Tugarin is also portrayed as Roman Catholic rival of Prince Vladimir. (Note: Of course, Aloyosha Popovich too has the "Son of Pope" byname, his father being called the "prebendary León" (or "Catheral priest Leontii") or "León the pope".)

=== Nature myth ===
It has been suggested by some commentators that Tugarin represents the element of fire, since in some versions of "Alyosha Popovich", Tugarin's torso is covered with fiery snakes which he uses as a weapon, attempts to strangle Alyosha with smoke, throw fiery sparks at him, scorch him with fire, and shoot firebrands (головни́, or ignited logs of wood) at him.

Tugarin may also represent the element of water, because their duel usually takes place near a river (usually the Safat River). However, Tugarin is defeated due to rain, which spoils his papery wings.

== Combat with Alyosha ==
Tugarin Zmeyevich is best known from the bylina about his duel with Alyosha Popovich, which comes in many different versions. The story is also found in the prose fairytale version.

In some versions, the two meet for the duel at Safat River, where they pitch pavilions. Tugarin roars in a booming voice, or else hisses like a snake.

He is flying in the sky flapping his paper-like wings, which fail him when it rains. Alyosha Popovich wins the duel, cuts Tugarin's body into pieces and scatters them across the field.

Some bylinas mention Tugarin's intimate relations with the wife of Prince Vladimir. When she finds out about his death, she turns sad and reproaches Alyosha Popovich for separating her from her "dear friend".

== Other dragons ==
Tugarin Zmeyevich is a chronical character of an ancient dragon-fighting myth, related to Zmey Gorynych (Russian: “Змей Горыныч”, Ukrainian: “Змій Горинич”), Fiery Dragon (Russian: “Огненный Змей”) etc.

== Modern depictions ==
The legend of Tugarin Zmeyevich is mentioned in the novel The City Beautiful by Aden Polydoros, with the character Yakov imagining the antisemitic murderer of his family as Tugarin. The dragon is portrayed as an amalgamation of burned corpses.
