= Dobrynya Nikitich =

Russian legendary figure

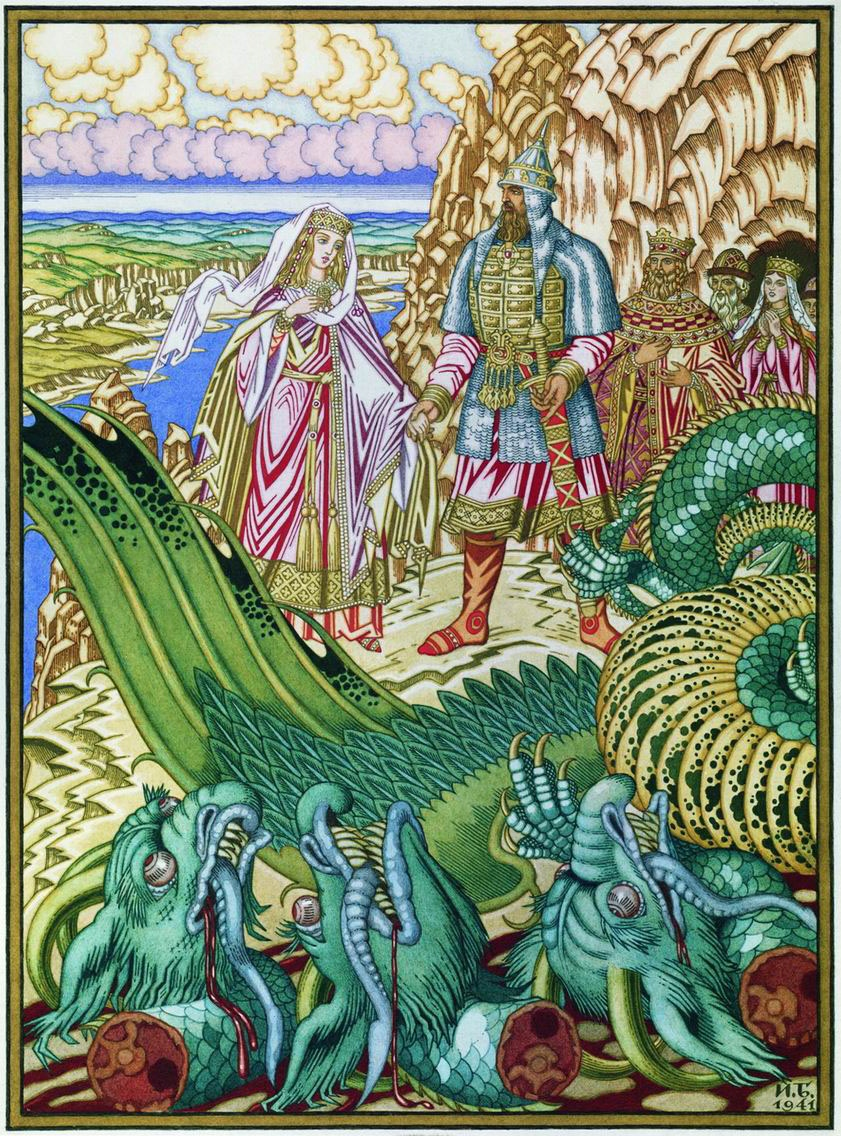
Dobrynya Nikitich rescues Zabava Putyatishna from the dragon Gorynych, 1941 illustration.

Dobrynya Nikitich (Russian: Добрыня Никитич) is one of the most popular bogatyrs (epic knights) from the "Kievan" series of Russian folklore based on bylina (epic songs) originating from the area around the capital of the Kievan Rus, Kiev. According to the bylinas, Dobrynya is the son of the Ryazan voivode Nikita. Albeit fictional, this character is based on a real warlord Dobrynya, who led the armies of Svyatoslav the Great and tutored his son Vladimir the Great.

Many byliny center on Dobrynya completing tasks set him by prince Vladimir. Dobrynya is often portrayed as being close to the royal family, undertaking sensitive and diplomatic missions. As a courtier, Dobrynya seems to be a representative of the noble class of warriors. He is a professional archer, swimmer, and wrestler. He plays the gusli, plays tafl, and is known for his courtesy and cunning.

== Dobrynya and the Dragon ==
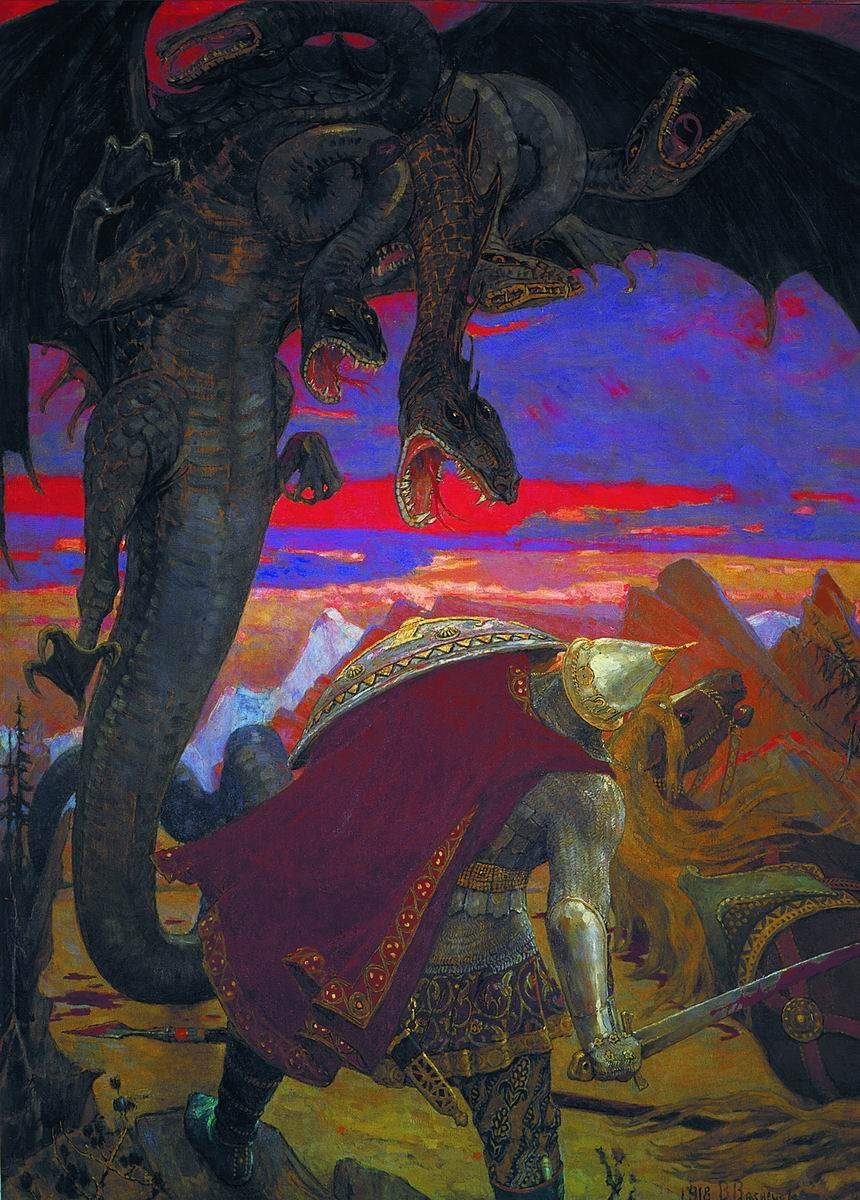
Victor Vasnetsov. Dobrynya Nikitich and dragon Zmei Gorynych, 1913–1918.

The following summary is after the version localized in the Povenets District of Olonets Province, collected by A. F. Gilferding in 1871, from the singer P. L. Kalinin:

The bylina starts with Dobrynya's mother telling Dobrynya to avoid the Saracen Mountains, not to trample on baby dragons, not to rescue Russian captives, and not to bathe in the Puchai River. Dobrynya disobeyed his mother and did all four things.

When he bathed in the Puchai River, he encountered a dragon with twelve trunks (in some variants identified as the Zmey Gorynych). Unarmed and desperate, Dobrynya discovered "a hat of the Greek land" and used it to defeat the dragon. (Note: Although used as a heavy weapon, in the version sung here, its original significance was that this was a hat worn by medieval pilgrims after visiting Mount Athos.)

The dragon, apparently a female, (Note: It says when it offers its peace pact, "I'll be your little sister".) pleaded for Dobrynya not to kill her, and the two made a nonaggression pact. The dragon broke the promise immediately and flew off to Kiev, abducting Zabava Putyatishna, the niece of Prince Vladimir.

When Dobrynya arrived at Kiev, Prince Vladimir commanded him to rescue his niece, on pain of death. Dobrynya complained to his mother he had neither steed nor spear for the task, and is given the heirloom horse Burko and a magic Shemakha whip of braided silk. (He carried a spear too, as revealed later).

Dobrynya rescued some captives and trampled on the dragon pups, but one of them bit into the horse's leg and immobilized it. Dobrynya remembered the magic whip, whose lashes restored vigor in the horse and he was freed. The dragon emerged angry for the death of her pups and refused to surrender Zabava without a fight.

Dobrynya fought the dragon at the Saracen Mountains for three days. On the third day he wanted to give up and leave, but a voice from Heaven told to fight for three more hours. Dobrynya eventually killed the dragon in three hours.

The dragon's blood did not seep into the ground, and Dobrynya wallowed in the pool for three days. A voice from Heaven eventually told him to stick his spear in the ground and say an incantation. The blood was then swallowed by the earth, and Zabava was rescued.

Since Dobrynya was a peasant, he could not marry Zabava and gave her to Alyosha Popovich. Dobrynya encountered a polyanitsa, Nastasia, and married her instead.

== Archeological Finds ==
On 2 November 2024, A seal belonging to a descendant of the Russian hero Dobrynya was found during excavations in the center of Oryol, Russia, reported archaeologist and historian Oleg Radyush. According to Oleg, this seal probably belonged to the Kiev governor, the voyevode (general) Putyata Vyshatich (son of Vyshata Dobrynych, grandson of Dobrynya Nikitich). Putyata Vyshatich served Prince Svyatoslav II Izyaslavich, who ruled Kiev in 1093–1113. This allowed scientists to determine the age of the find. Ref: https://news.ru/regions/arheologi-nashli-artefakt-svyazannyj-s-russkim-bogatyrem/

== In media and popular culture ==
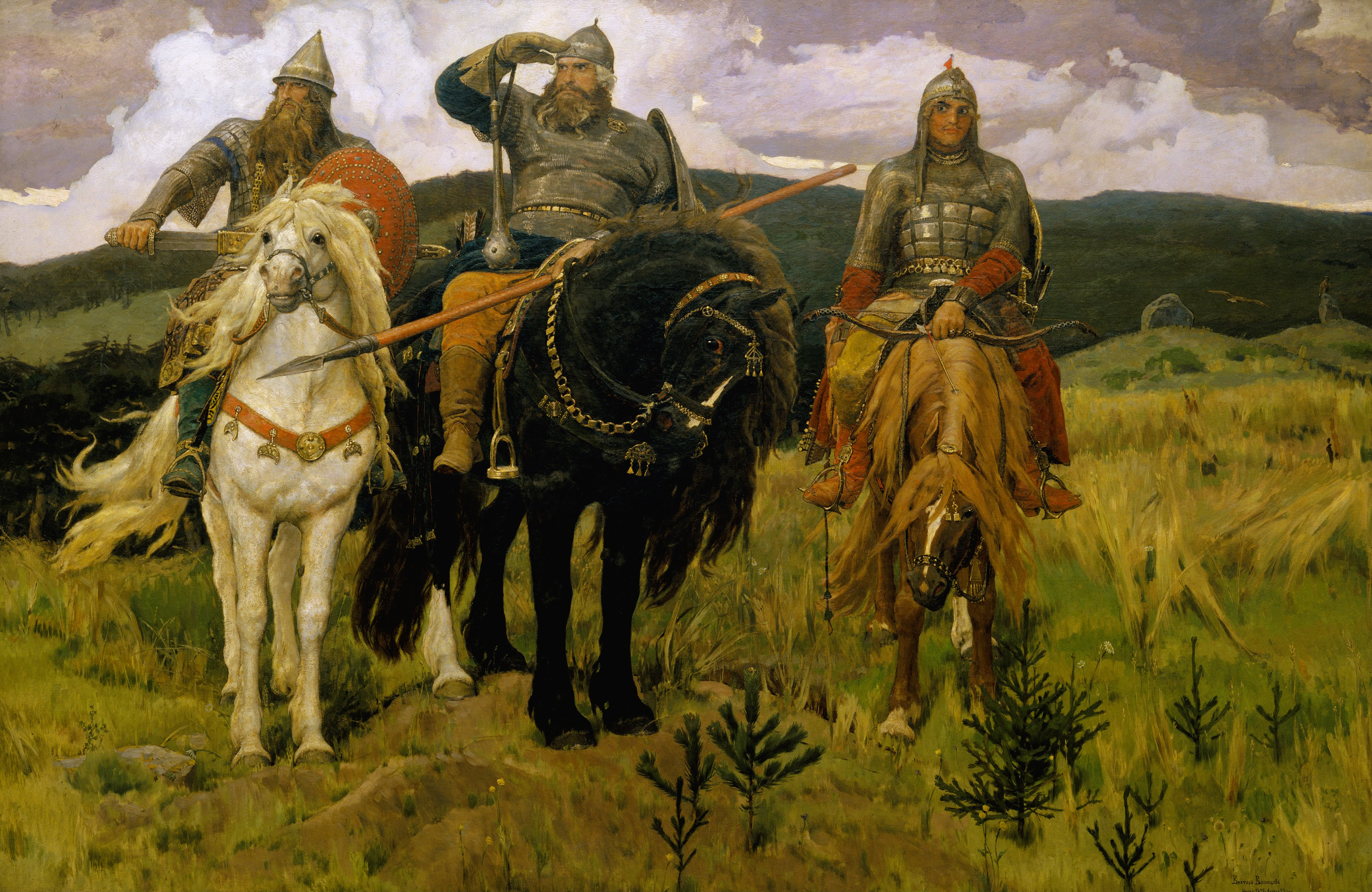
Victor Vasnetsov's 1898 painting Bogatyrs: Dobrynya is on the left, alongside Ilya Muromets and Alyosha Popovich

Painting

- Viktor Vasnetsov's famous painting Bogatyrs (1898) features Dobrynya alongside fellow folk heroes, Ilya Muromets and Alyosha Popovich.

Music and opera

- Mentioned in Farewell of Slavianka (1997)
- In 1901, composer Alexander Grechaninov wrote an opera titled Dobrynya Nikitich.

Film and animation

- «ILYA MUROMETS AND THE NIGHTINGALE THE ROBBER» «ILYA MUROMEC I SOLOVEJ-RAZBOJNIK» (animated film) SOYUZMULTFILM (1978) directed by Ivan Aksenchuk and written by Michael Volpin
- In 2006, an animated feature film, Dobrynya Nikitich and Zmey Gorynych featured the bogatyr's exploits.
- The Three Bogatyrs (Три богатыря), animated franchise produced by Melnitsa Animation Studio (2004-)
- The Stronghold (film) (2017)

Literature

- Dobrynya Nikitich is the uncle of the great prince Vladimir I in Victor Porotnikov's historical dilogie (Dobrynya Nikitich. For Russian Land!, 2012; Bloody Christening "with the Fire and the Sword", 2013).
- Dobrynya Nikitich was also a member of Vladimir II Monomakh's armed force in the novel Bogatyr's Armed Force of Monomakh. Rus' in the Fire! (2014), written by Vadim Nikolayev.

Video Games

- A female version of Dobrynya Nikitich, later revealed to be his wife Nastasia masquerading as him, was added to the mobile phone game Fate/Grand Order as a Rider-class Servant in 2021.

Other

- In 2015, Russian police gifted the French police a dog named after the folk hero Dobrynya in solidarity after the loss of Diesel, a French police dog in a raid following the 13 November attacks in Paris.
- The icebreaker ship Dobrynya Nikitich (1916), and a later class of icebreakers were named after the hero.
