= Viktor Vasnetsov =

Russian painter (1848–1926)

- Виктор Васнецов
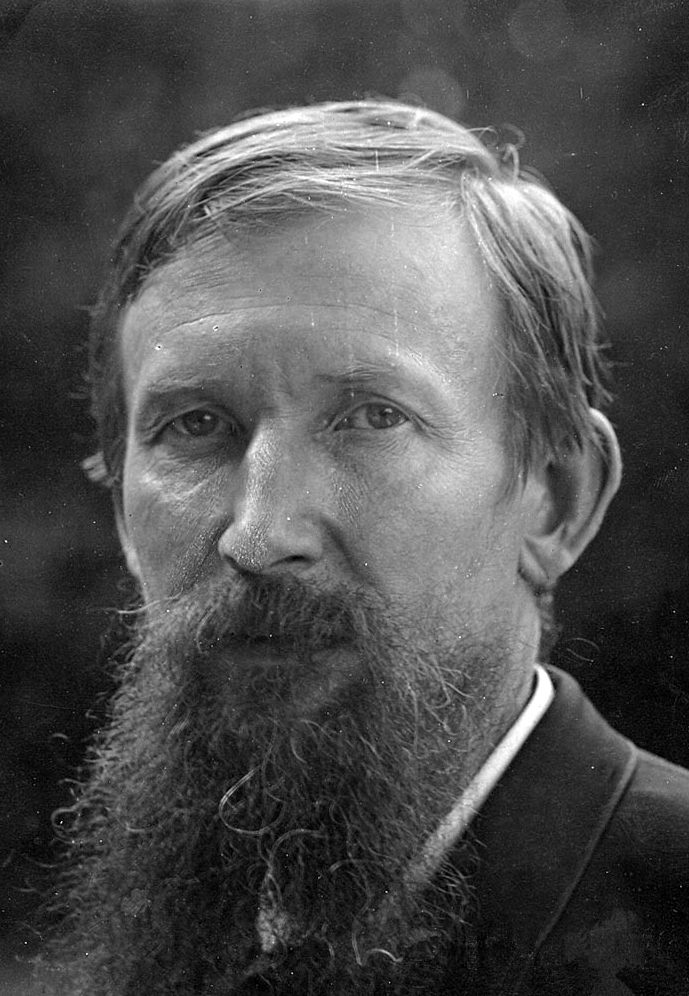
- Vasnetsov in 1895
- Born: Viktor Mikhaylovich Vasnetsov; 15 May 1848; Lopyal, Vyatka Governorate, Russian Empire
- Died: 23 July 1926 (aged 78); Moscow, Russian SFSR, Soviet Union
- Resting place: Vvedenskoye Cemetery, Moscow
- Education: Imperial Academy of Arts
- Known for: Painting
- Notable work: A Knight at the Crossroads; Bogatyrs
- Movement: National Romantic
- Relatives: Apollinary Vasnetsov (younger brother)
- Patrons: Pavel Tretyakov; Savva Mamontov

Viktor Mikhaylovich Vasnetsov (Russian: Виктор Михайлович Васнецов; 15 May [O.S. 3 May] 1848 – 23 July 1926) was a Russian painter and draughtsman who specialised in mythological and historical subjects. He is considered a co-founder of Russian folklorist and romantic nationalistic painting, and a key figure in the Russian Revivalist movement.

== Biography ==
=== Childhood (1848–1858) ===
Viktor Vasnetsov was born in the remote village of Lopyal in Vyatka Governorate in 1848, the second of the seven children (his only sister died 4 months after her birth). His father Mikhail Vasilievich Vasnetsov (1823–1870), known to be philosophically inclined, was a member of the priesthood, and a scholar of the natural sciences and astronomy. His grandfather was an icon painter. Two of Mikhail Vasnetsov's six sons, Viktor and Apollinary, became remarkable painters, three becoming schoolteachers and one a Russian folklorist. It was in Lopyal that Viktor started to paint, mostly landscapes and scenes of village life. Recalling his childhood in a letter to Vladimir Stasov, Vasnetsov remarked that he "had lived with peasant children and liked them not as a narodnik but as a friend".

=== Vyatka (1858–1867) ===
From the age of ten, Viktor studied in a seminary in Vyatka, each summer moving with his family to a rich merchant village of Ryabovo. During his seminary years, he worked for a local icon shopkeeper. He also helped an exiled Polish artist, Michał Elwiro Andriolli, to execute frescoes for Vyatka's Alexander Nevsky cathedral.

Having graduated from the seminary, Viktor decided to move to Saint Petersburg to study art. He auctioned his paintings of Woman Harvester and Milk-maid (both 1867) to raise the money required for the trip to the Russian capital.

=== Saint Petersburg (1867–1876) ===
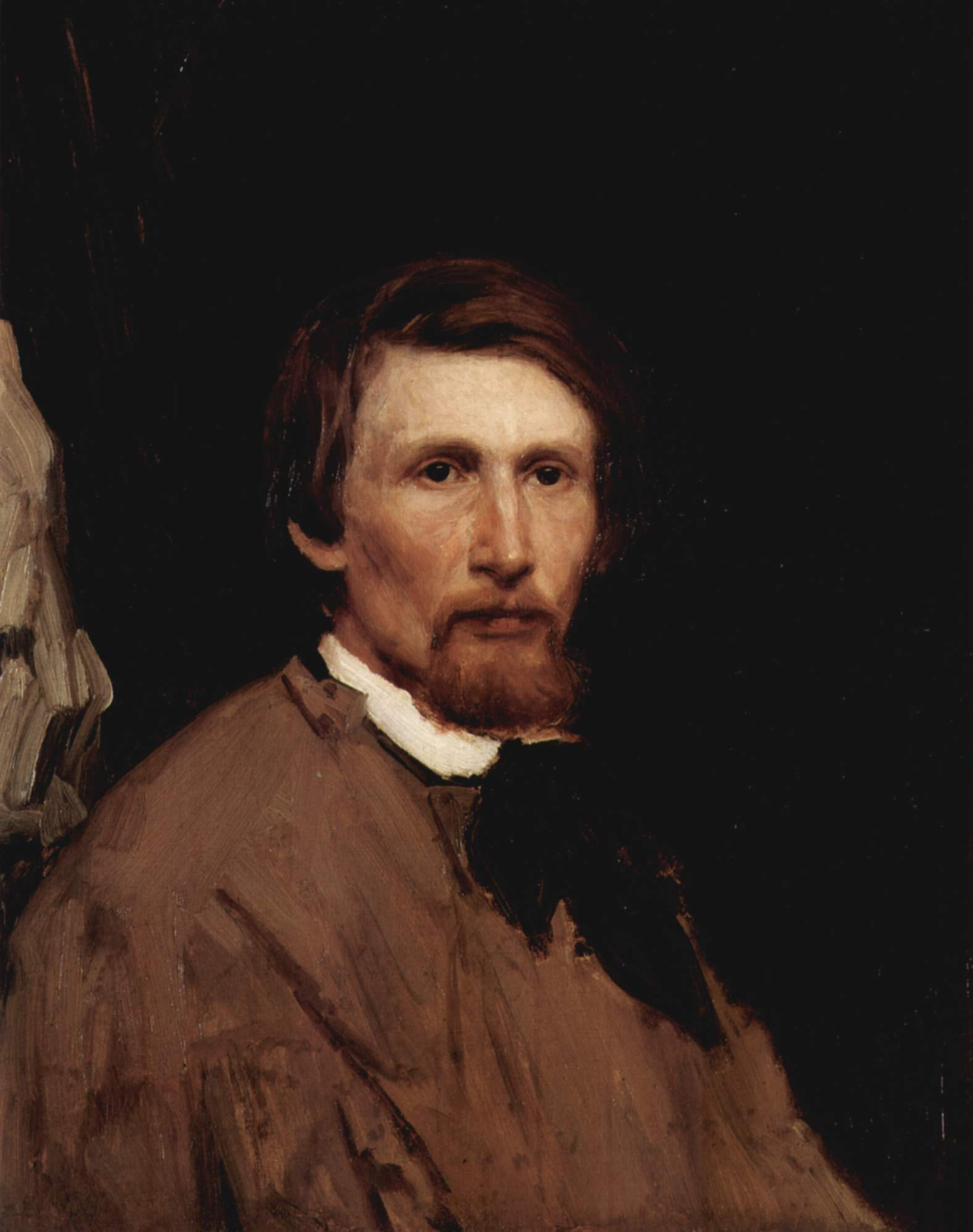
Self-Portrait, 1873

In August 1867 Viktor tried to enter the Imperial Academy of Arts, but failed. He succeeded one year later in August 1868. Already in 1863 a group of fourteen students left the Academy, finding its rules too constraining. This led to the Peredvizhniki movement of realist painters rebelling against Academism. Vasnetsov befriended their leader Ivan Kramskoi during his drawing classes before entering the Academy, referring to him as his teacher. He also became very close to fellow student, Ilya Repin.

Viktor, whose name would subsequently be associated with historical and mythological paintings, initially avoided these subjects at all costs. For his graphic composition of Christ and Pontius Pilate Before the People, the Academy awarded a small silver medal to him. In the early 1870s he completed a large number of engravings depicting contemporary life. Two of them (Provincial Bookseller from 1870 and A Boy with a Bottle of Vodka from 1872) won him a bronze medal at the World Fair in London (1874). During this period he also started producing genre paintings in oil. Such pieces as Peasant Singers (1873) and Moving House (1876) were warmly welcomed by democratic circles of Russian society.

=== Paris (1876–1877) ===
In 1876 Repin invited Vasnetsov to join the Peredvizhniki colony in Paris. While living in France, Viktor studied classical and contemporary paintings, academist and Impressionist alike. During that period, he painted Acrobats (1877), produced prints, and exhibited some of his works at the Salon. It was in Paris that he became fascinated with fairy-tale subjects, starting to work on Ivan Tsarevich Riding a Grey Wolf and The Firebird. Vasnetsov was a model for Sadko in Repin's celebrated painting Sadko. In 1877 he returned to Moscow.

=== Moscow (1877–1884) ===
In the late 1870s Vasnetsov concentrated on illustrating Russian fairy tales and the epic narrative poem Bylinas, executing some of his best known pieces: The Knight at the Crossroads (1878), Prince Igor's Battlefield (1878), Three princesses of the Underground Kingdom (completed 1884 ), The Flying Carpet (1880), and Alionushka (1881). These works were not appreciated at the time they appeared. Many radical critics dismissed them as undermining the realist principles of the Peredvizhniki. Even such prominent connoisseurs as Pavel Mikhailovich Tretyakov refused to buy them. The vogue for Vasnetsov's paintings would spread in the 1880s, when he turned to religious subjects and executed a series of icons for Abramtsevo estate of his patron Savva Mamontov.

=== Kiev (1884–1889) ===
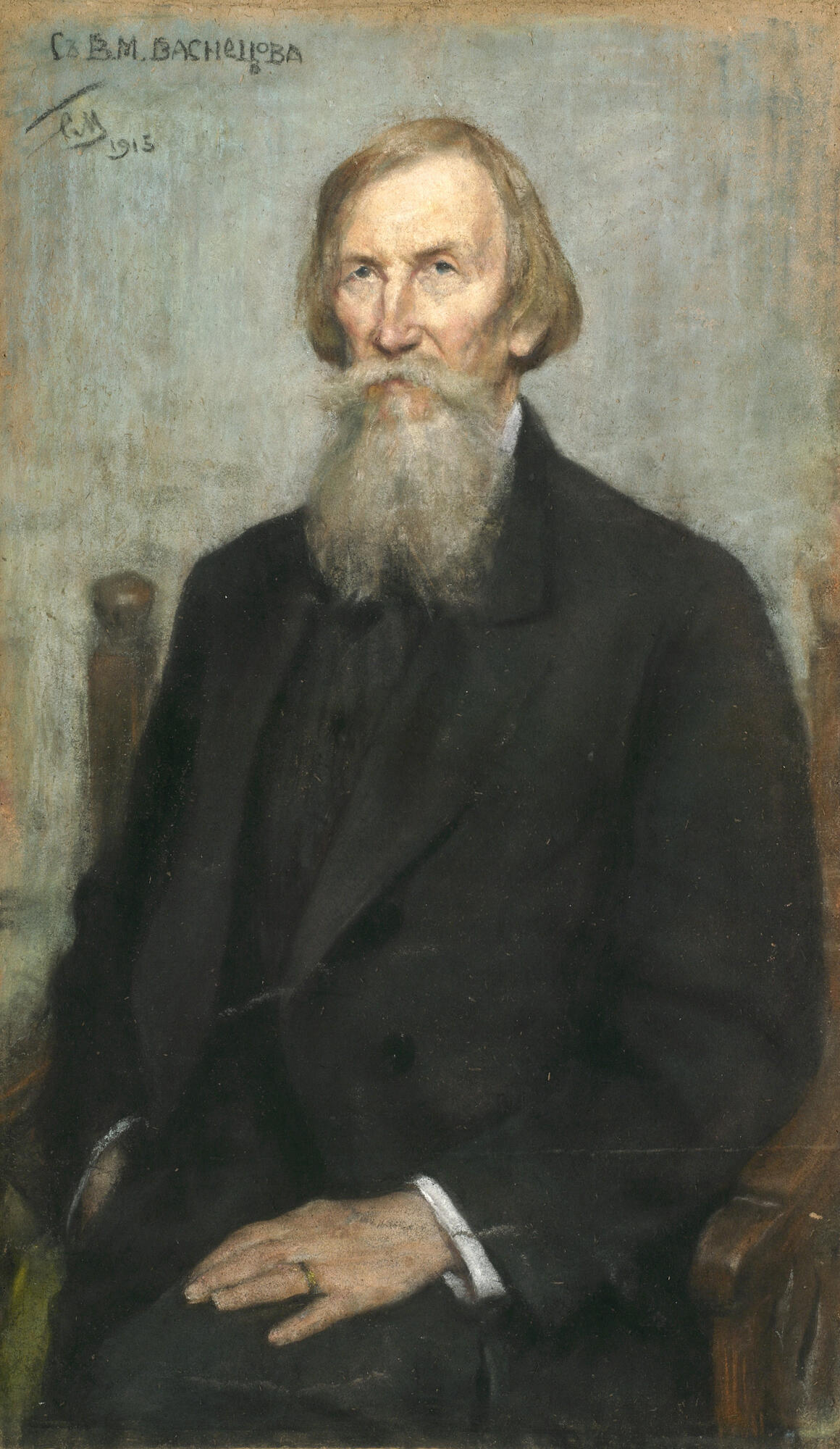
Portrait of Vasnetsov by Sergey Malyutin, 1915

In 1884–1889 Vasnetsov was commissioned to paint frescoes in St Vladimir's Cathedral in Kiev. This was a challenging work which ran contrary to both Russian and Western traditions of religious paintings. The influential art critic Vladimir Stasov labelled them a sacrilegious play with religious feelings of the Russian people. Another popular critic, Dmitry Filosofov, referred to these frescoes as "the first bridge over 200 years-old gulf separating different classes of Russian society".

While living in Kiev, Vasnetsov made friends with Mikhail Vrubel, who was also involved in the cathedral's decoration. While they worked together, Vasnetsov taught the younger artist a great deal. It was in Kiev that Vasnetsov finally finished Ivan Tsarevich Riding a Grey Wolf and started his most famous painting, the Bogatyrs. In 1885 the painter travelled to Italy. The same year he worked on stage designs and costumes for Nikolai Rimsky-Korsakov's opera The Snow Maiden.

=== Later years (1890–1926) ===
The following two decades were productive for Vasnetsov. He increasingly turned to other media during this period. In 1897 he collaborated with his brother Apollinary on the theatrical design of another Rimsky-Korsakov premiere, Sadko.

At the turn of the century, Vasnetsov elaborated his hallmark "fairy-tale" style of Russian Revivalist architecture. His first acclaimed design was a church in Abramtsevo (1882), executed jointly with Vasily Polenov. In 1894, he designed his own mansion in Moscow. The Russian pavilion of the World Fair in Paris followed in 1898. Finally, in 1904, Vasnetsov designed the best known of his "fairy-tale" buildings – the façade of the Tretyakov Gallery.

Between 1906 and 1911, Vasnetsov worked on the design of the mosaics for Alexander Nevsky Cathedral, Warsaw; he was also involved in the design of Alexander Nevsky Cathedral, Moscow. In 1912, he was given a noble title by Czar Nicholas II. In 1914, he designed a revenue stamp intended for voluntary collection for victims of World War I.

Even prior to the Russian Revolution, Vasnetsov became active as a regent of the Tretyakov Gallery. He allocated a significant portion of his income to the State Historical Museum, so that a large part of the museum's collection was acquired on Vasnetsov's money. After the October Revolution he advocated removing some of the religious paintings from churches to the Tretyakov Gallery.

In 1915, Vasnetsov participated in the designing of a military uniform for the Victory parade of the Russian army in Berlin and Constantinopole. Vasnetsov is credited with the creation of the budenovka (initially named bogatyrka), a military hat reproducing the style of Kievan Rus' cone-shaped helmets.

Vasnetsov died in Moscow in 1926, he was 78.

== Legacy ==
A minor planet, 3586 Vasnetsov, discovered by Soviet astronomer Lyudmila Zhuravlyova in 1978, is named after Viktor Vasnetsov and Apollinary Vasnetsov.

In the film Elizabeth: The Golden Age, Vasnetsov's painting of Ivan the Terrible is anachronistically presented as if it already existed in that Tsar's lifetime, and as being sent by Ivan to England when he offers to marry Queen Elizabeth I.

Vasnetsov's grandson, Andrei Vladimirovich Vasnetsov (1924–2009), was People's Artist of the USSR.

== Works ==
Viktor Vasnetsov's works

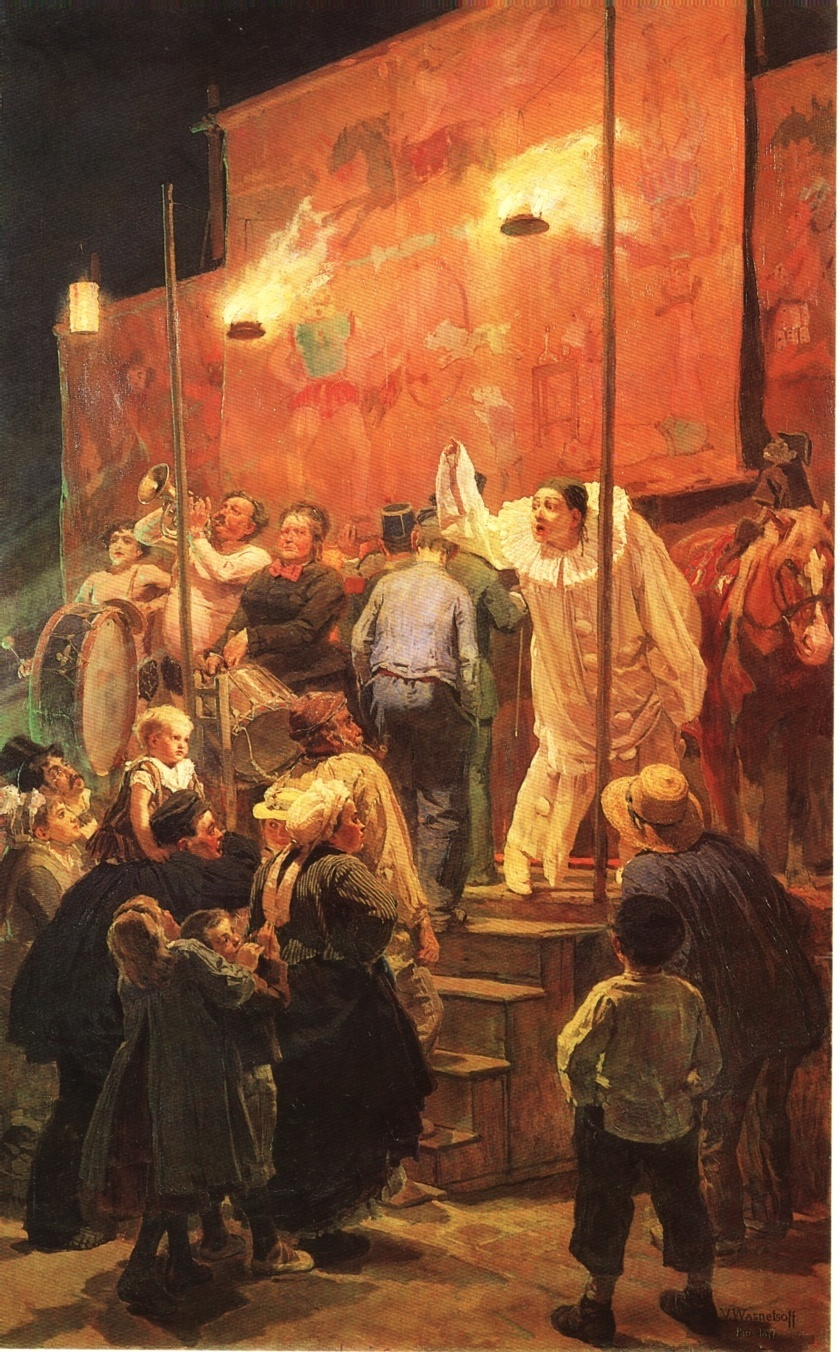
Acrobats. Festival in a Paris suburb (c. 1876 – 1877)

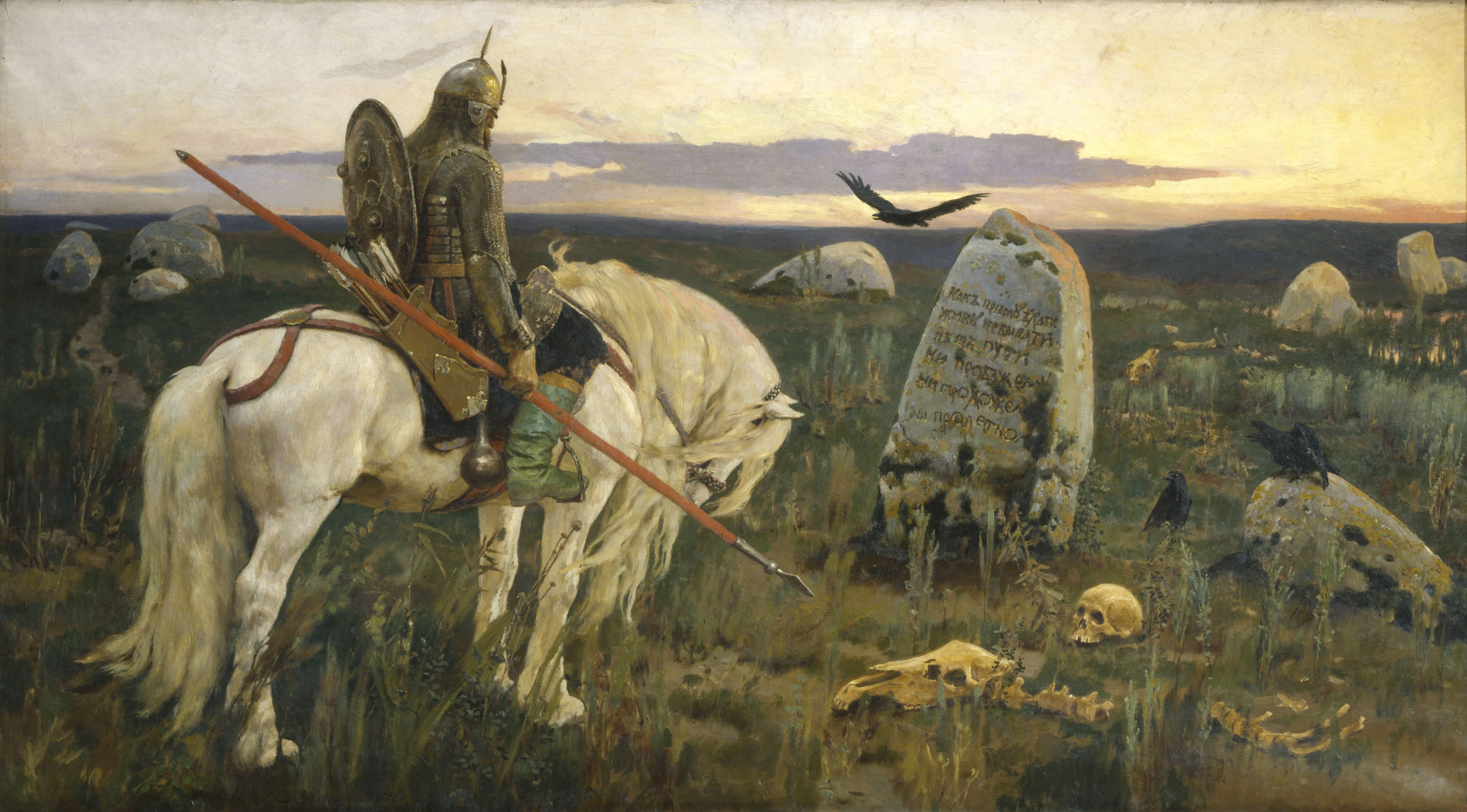
The Knight at the Crossroads (1878)

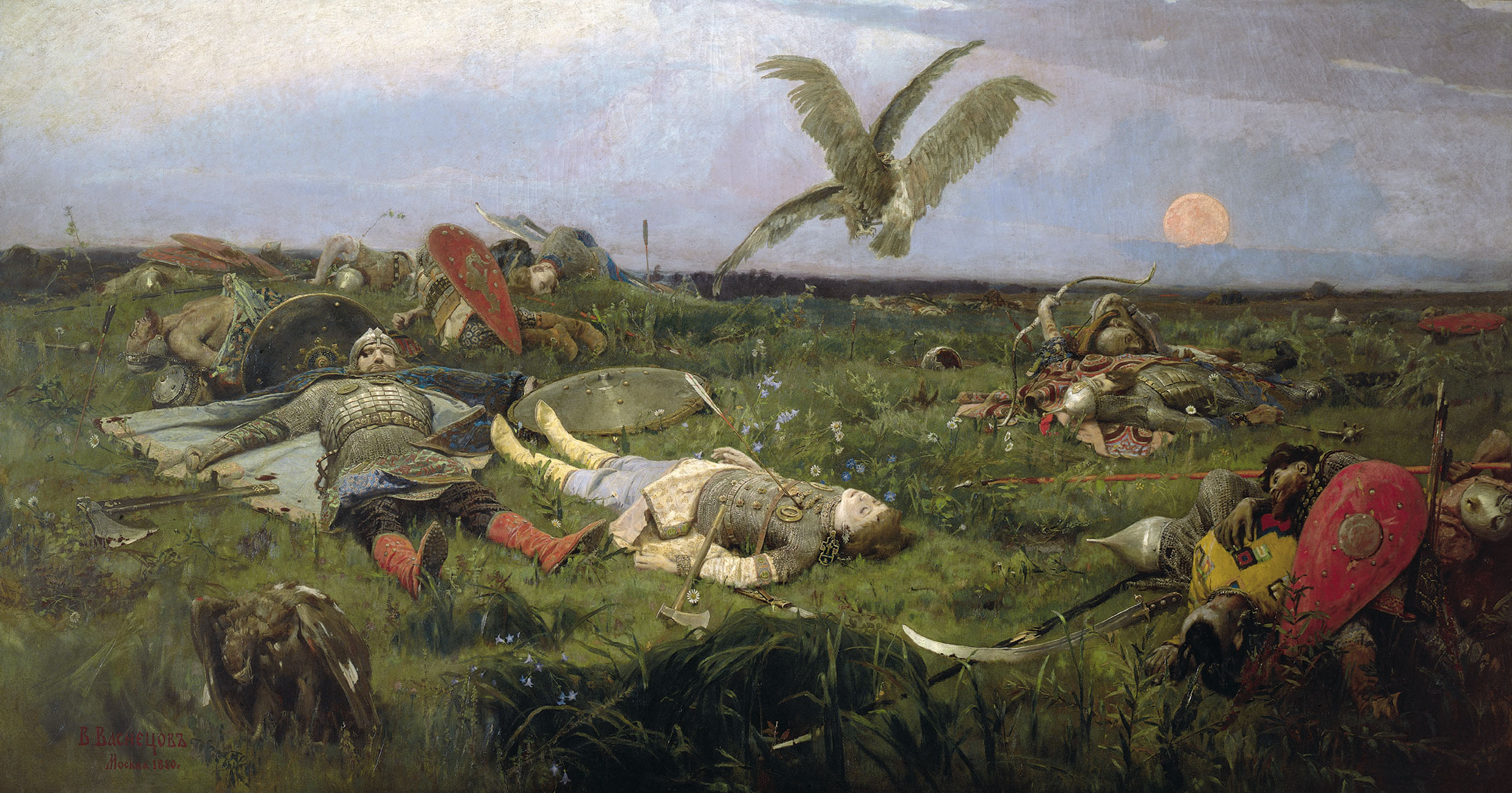
After Igor Svyatoslavich's fighting with the Cumans (1880)

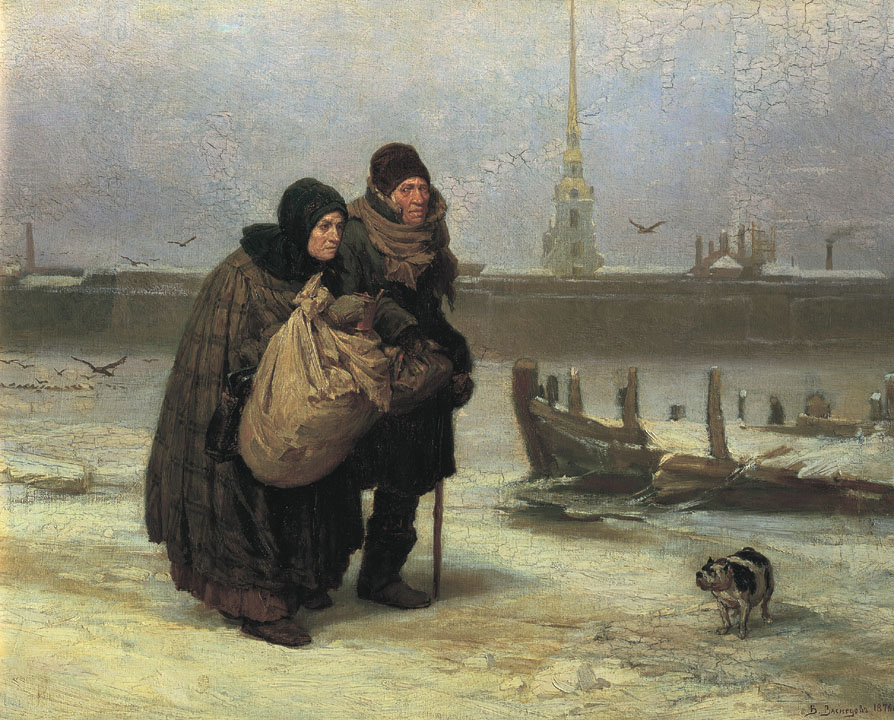
Moving House (1876)

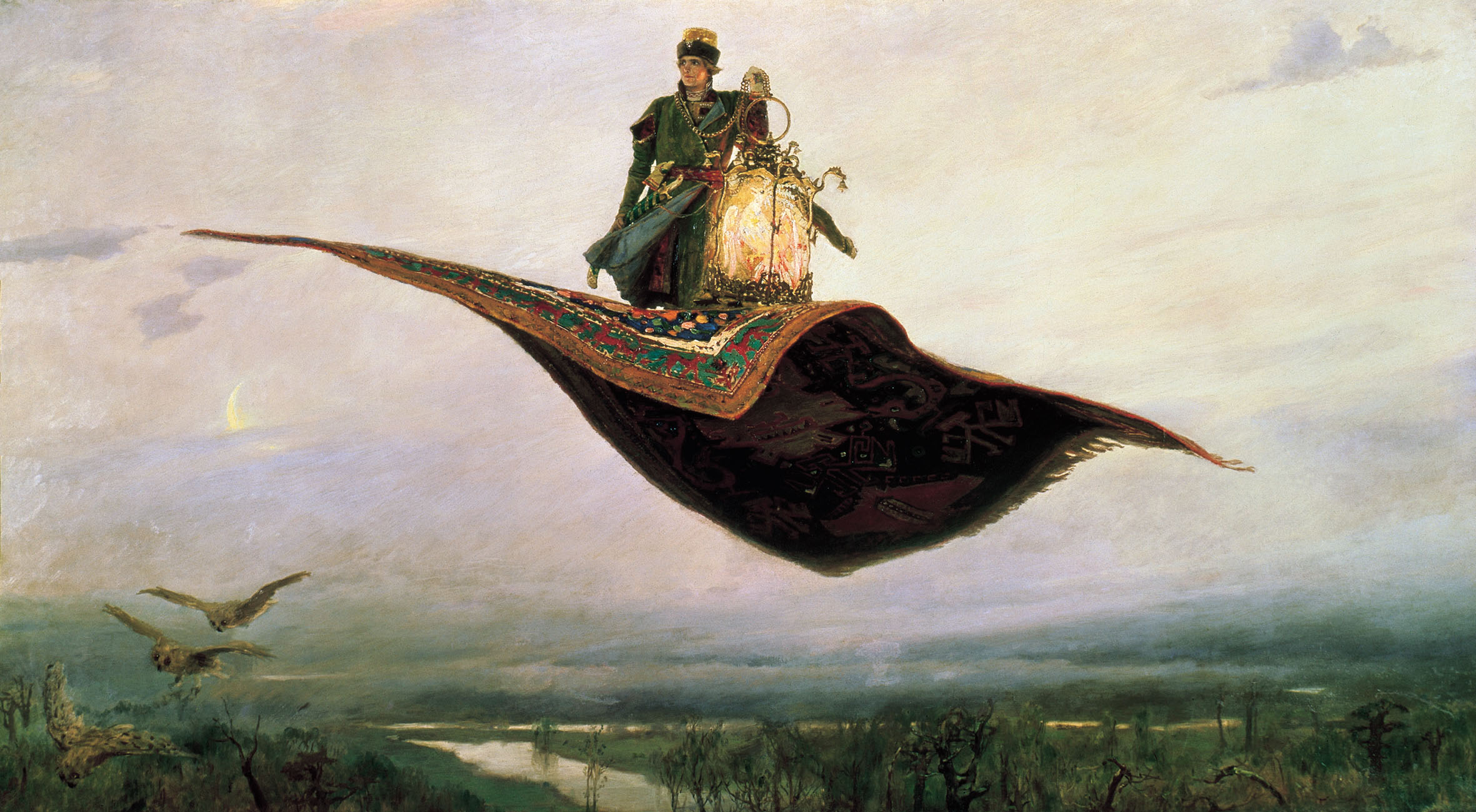
The Flying Carpet (1880)

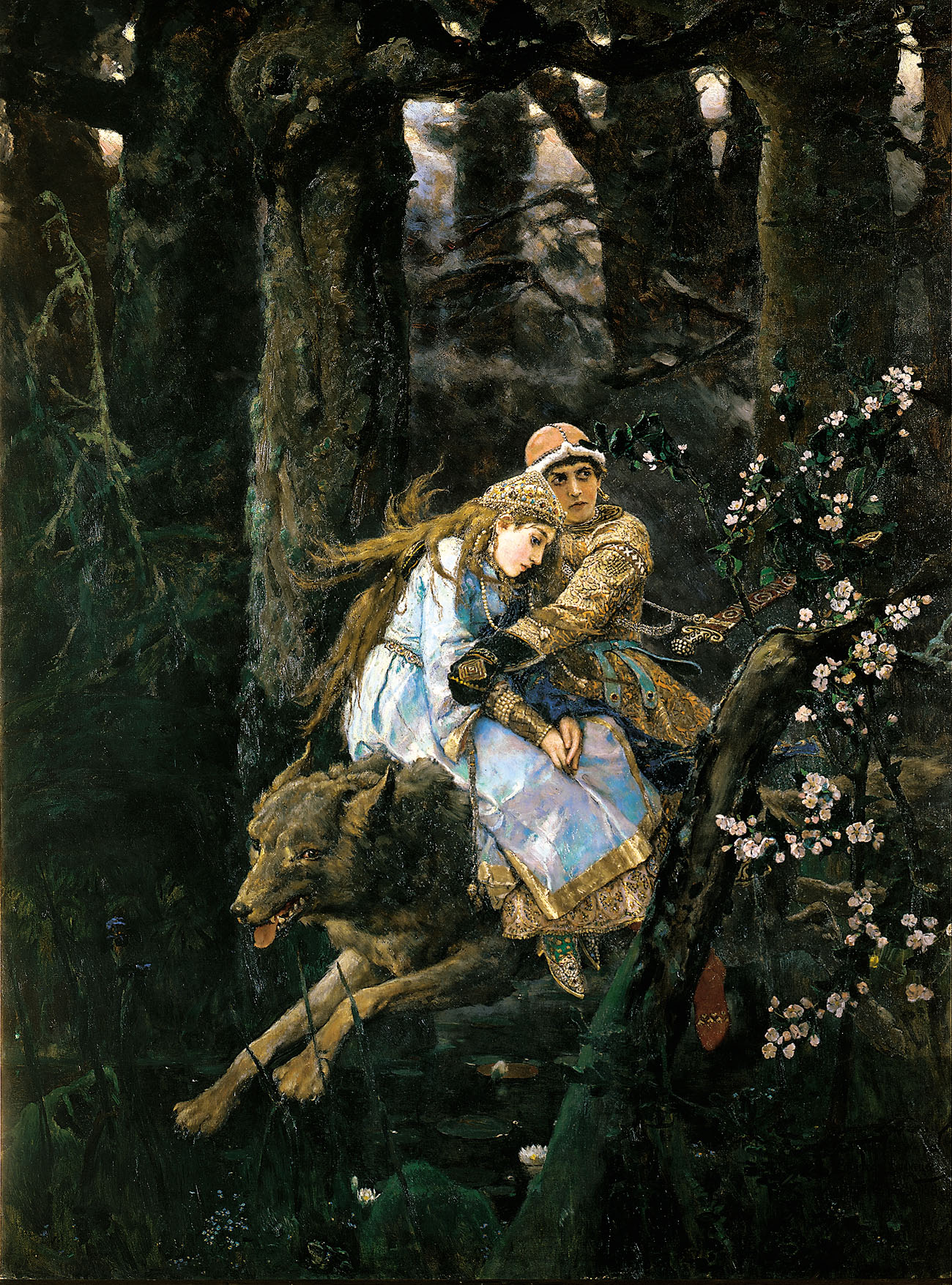
Ivan Tsarevich riding the Gray Wolf (1889)

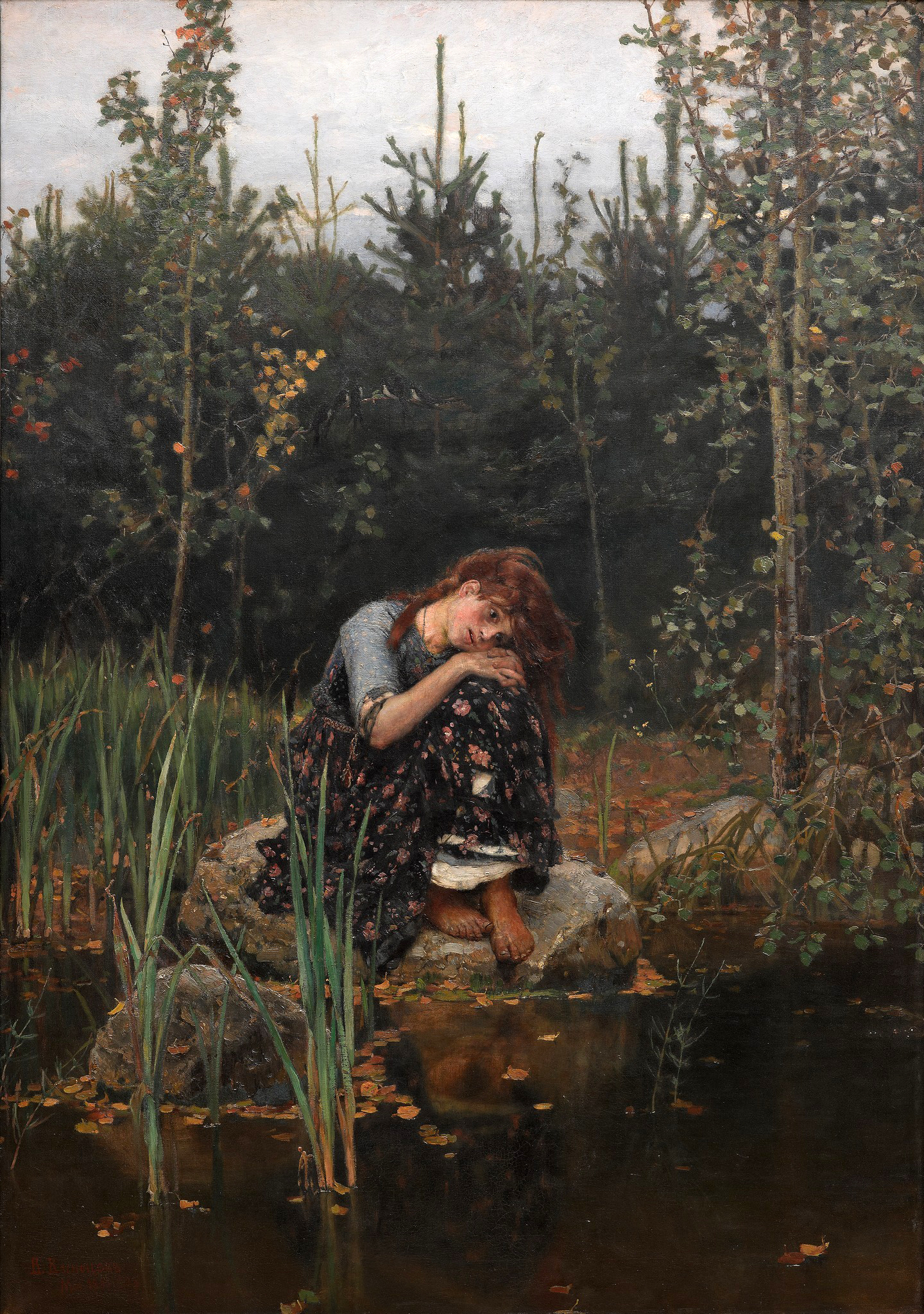
Alyonushka (1881)

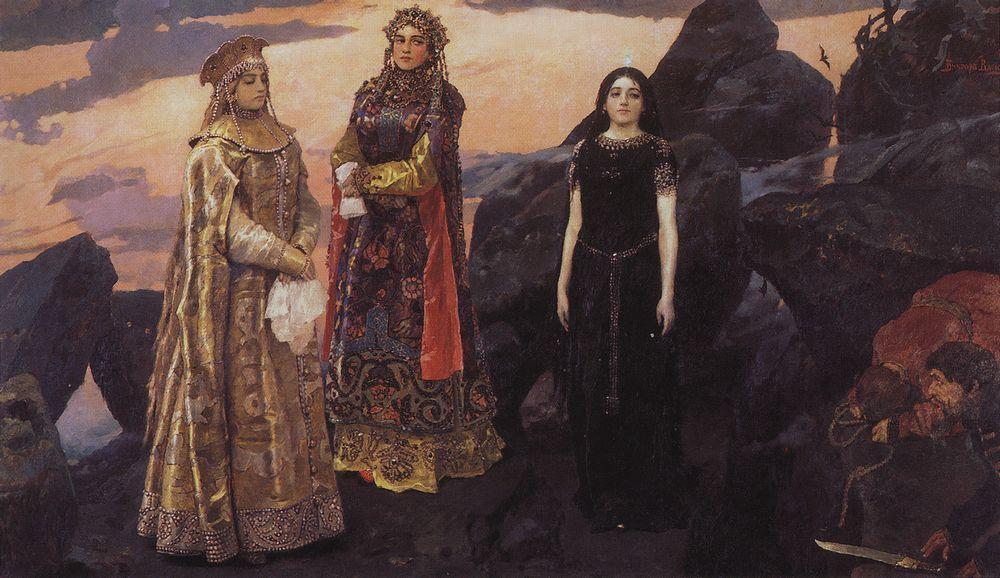
Three princesses of the Underground Kingdom (1884)

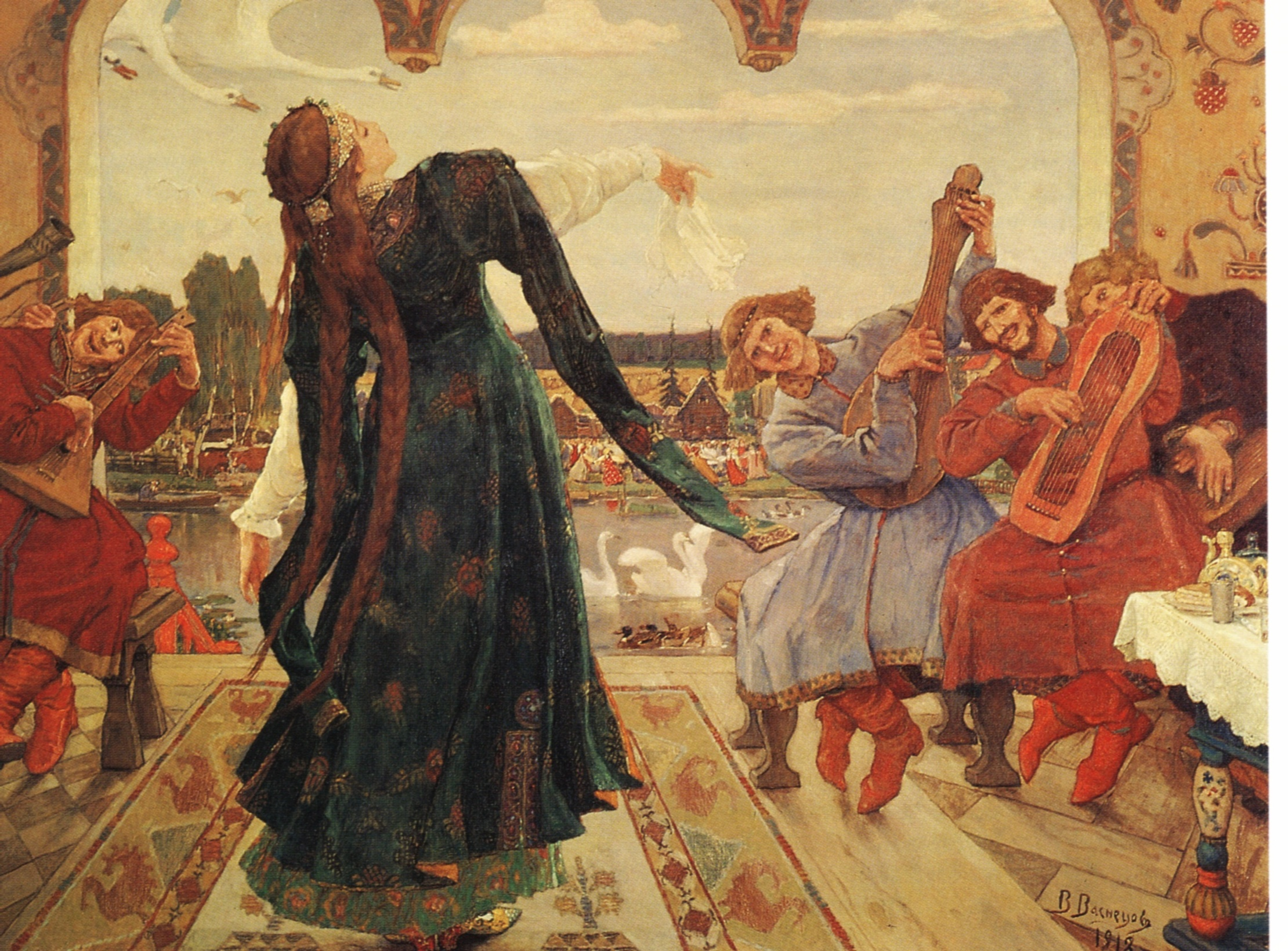
The Frog Princess (1918)

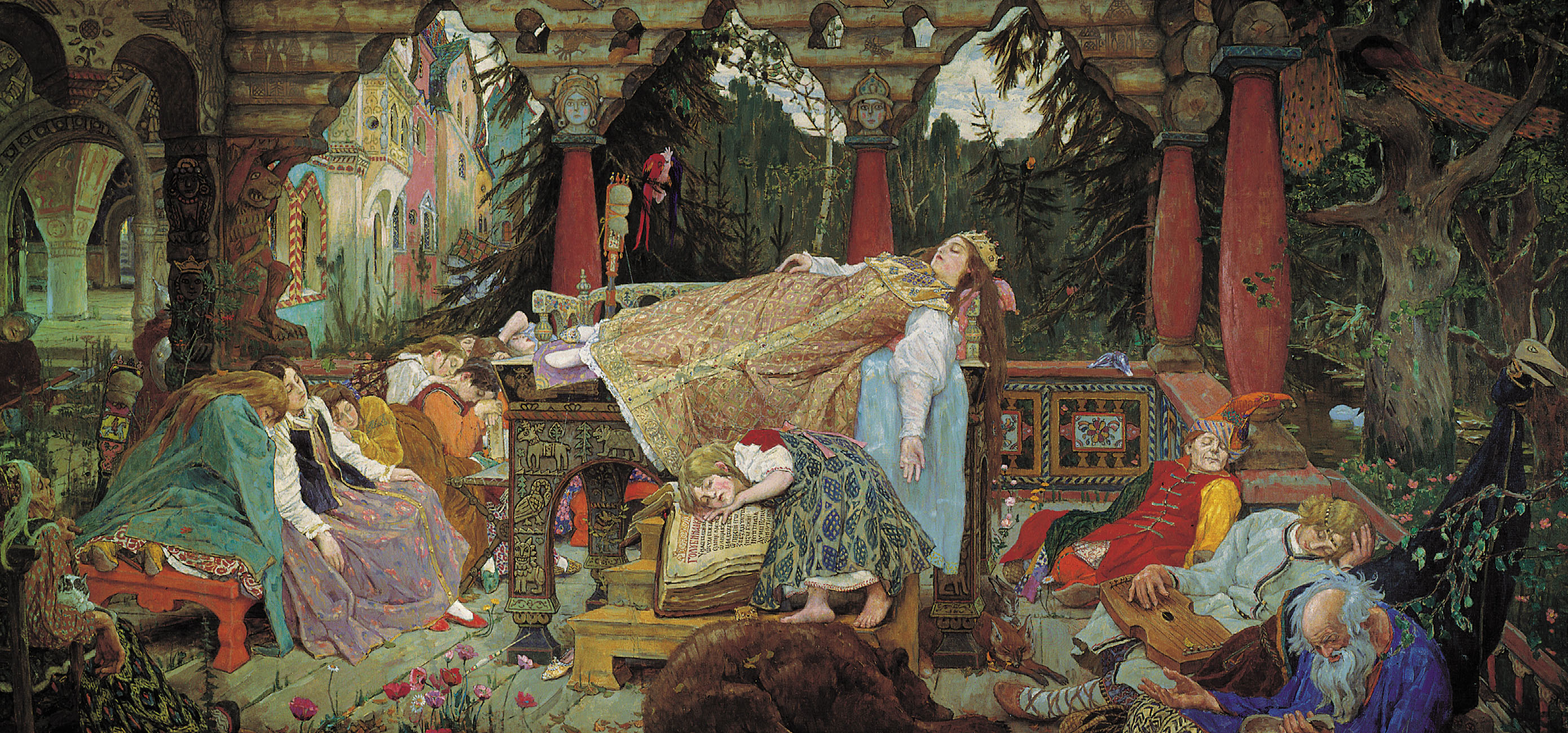
The Sleeping Queen (1926)

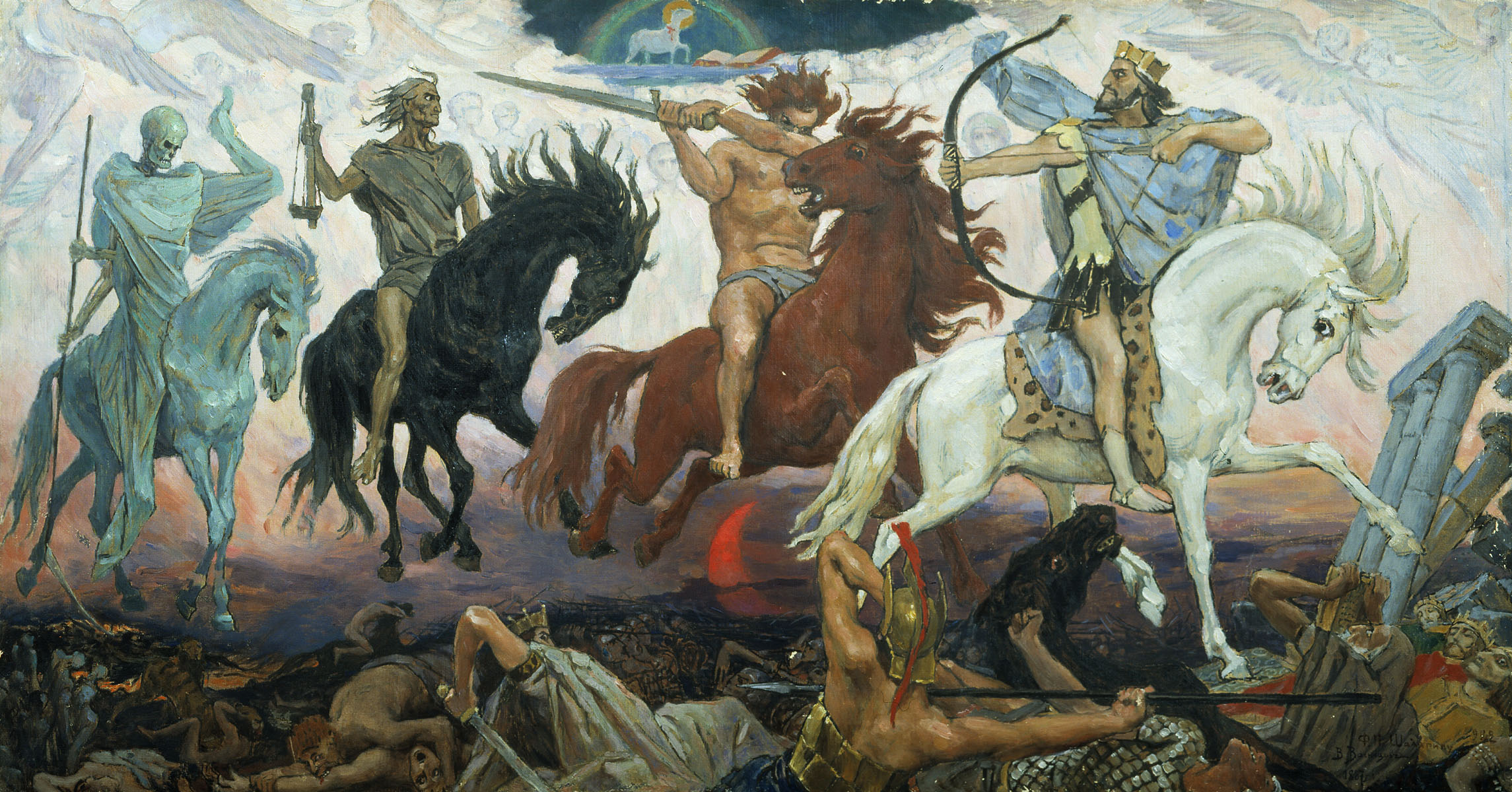
Four Horsemen of the Apocalypse (1887)

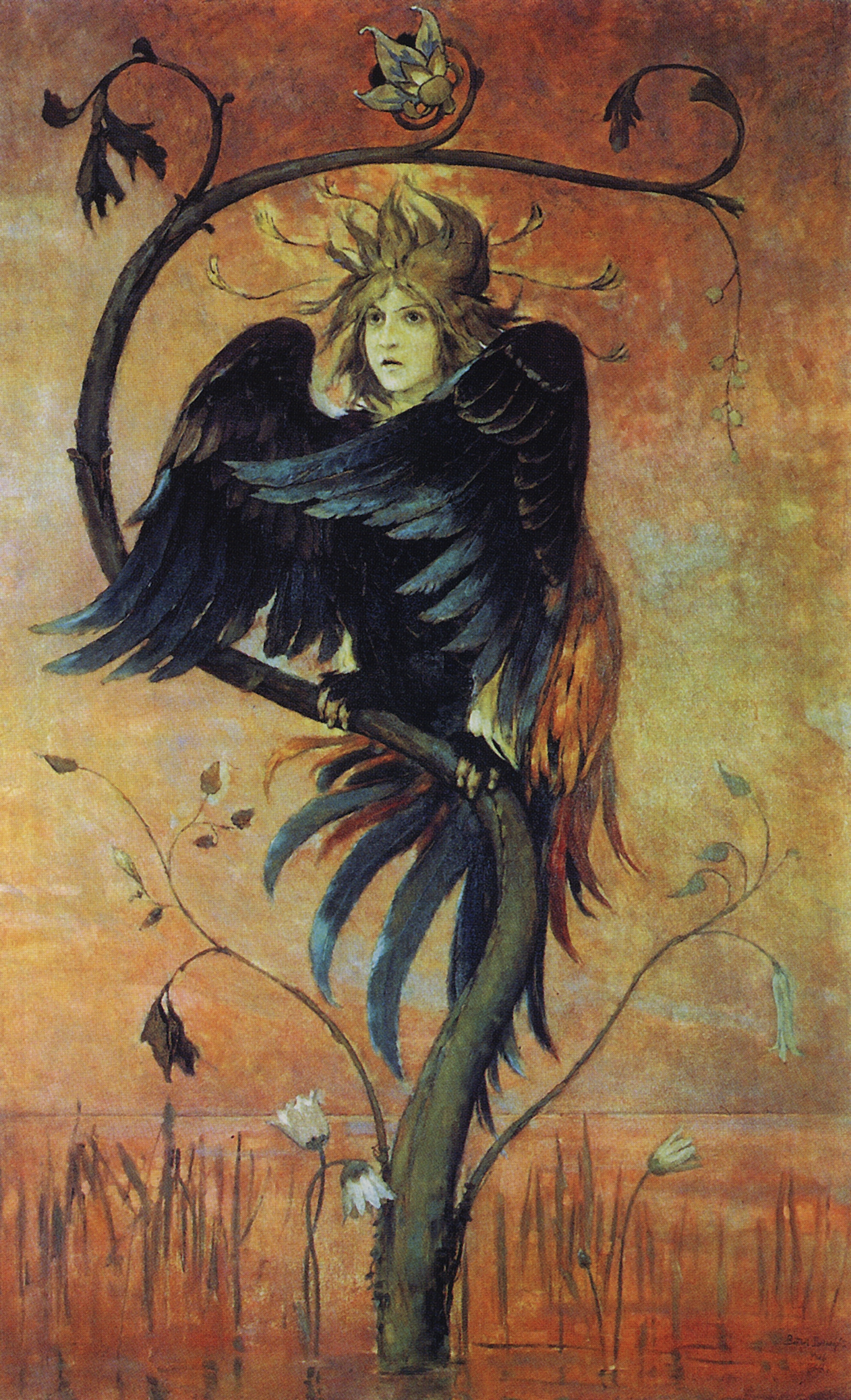
Gamayun the prophetic bird (1898)

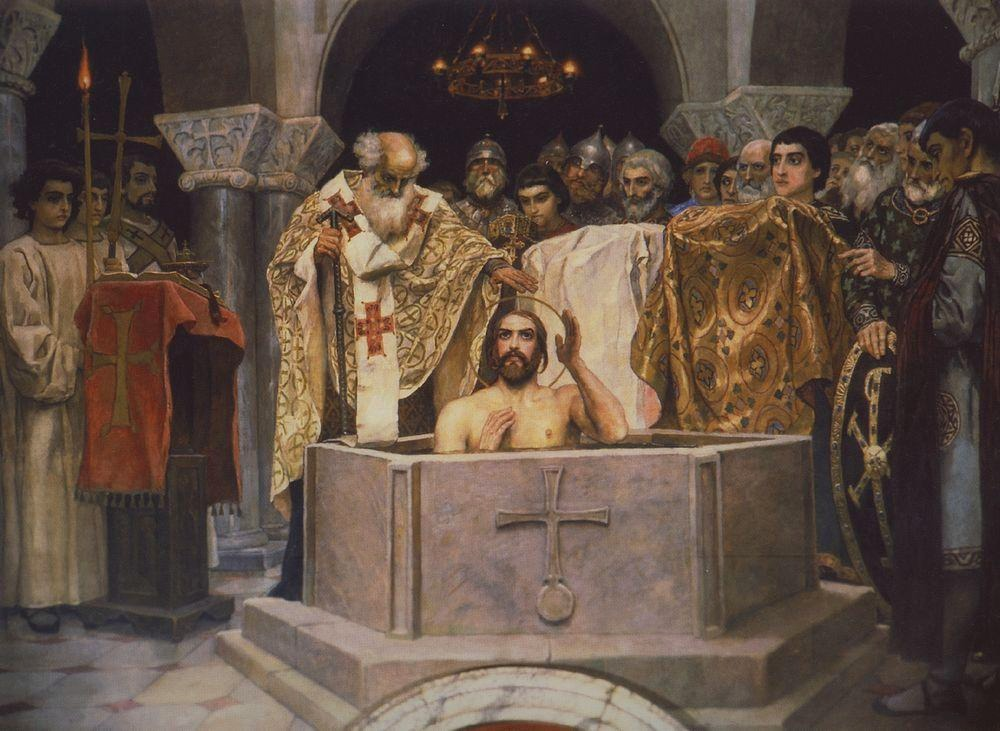
Baptism of Prince Vladimir (1890)

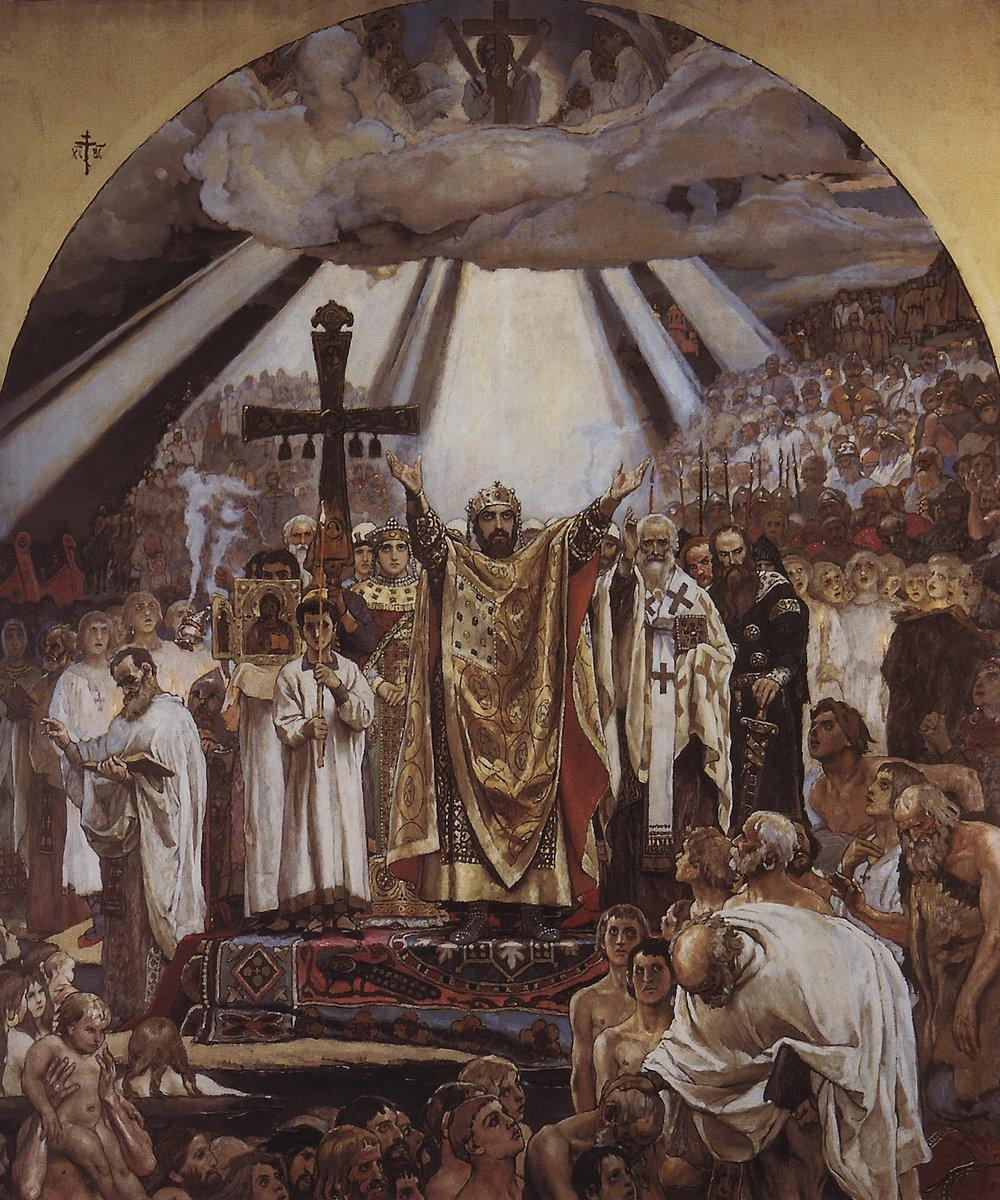
Baptism of Rus' (between 1885 and 1896)

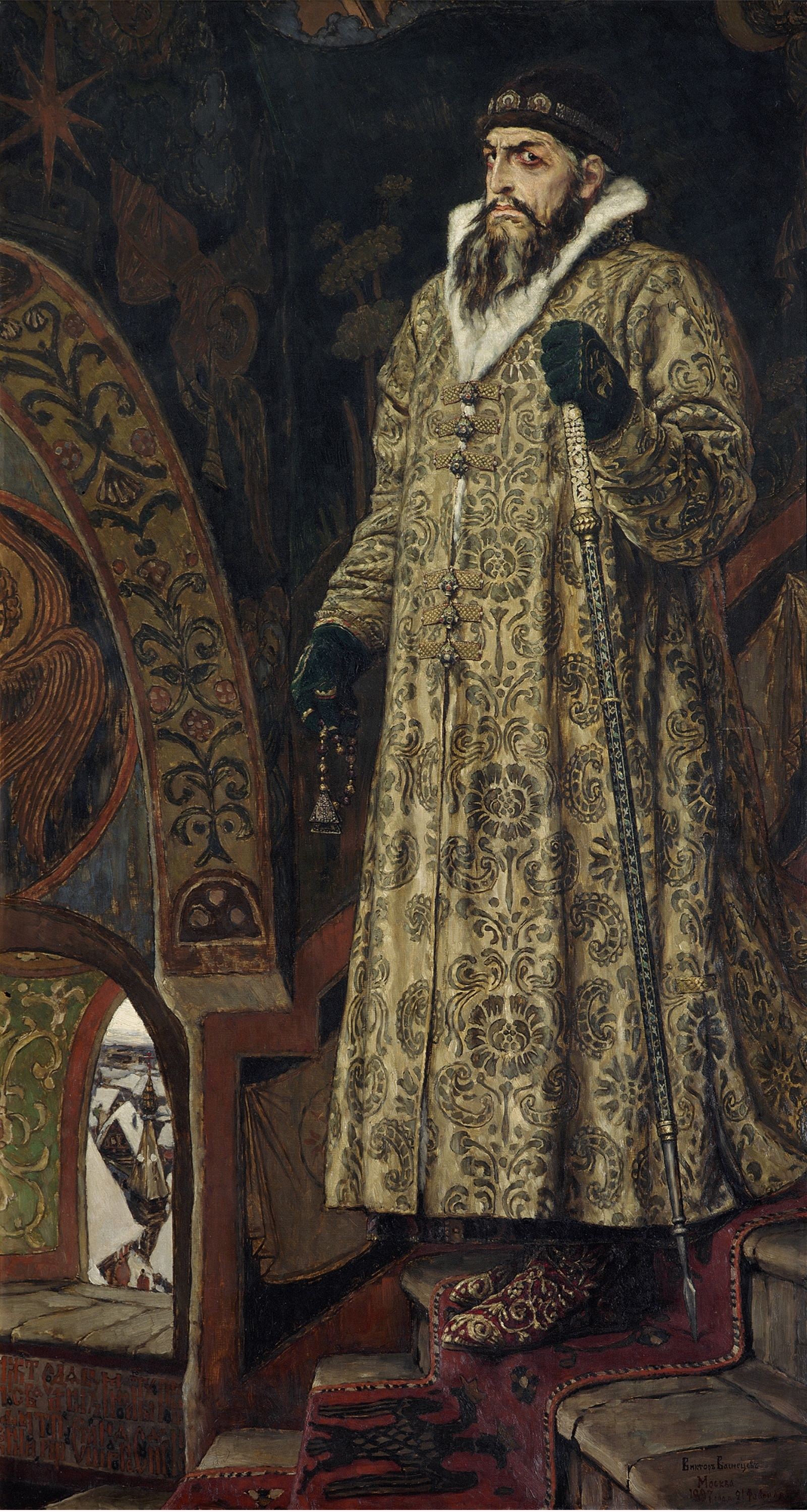
Tsar Ivan the Terrible (1897)

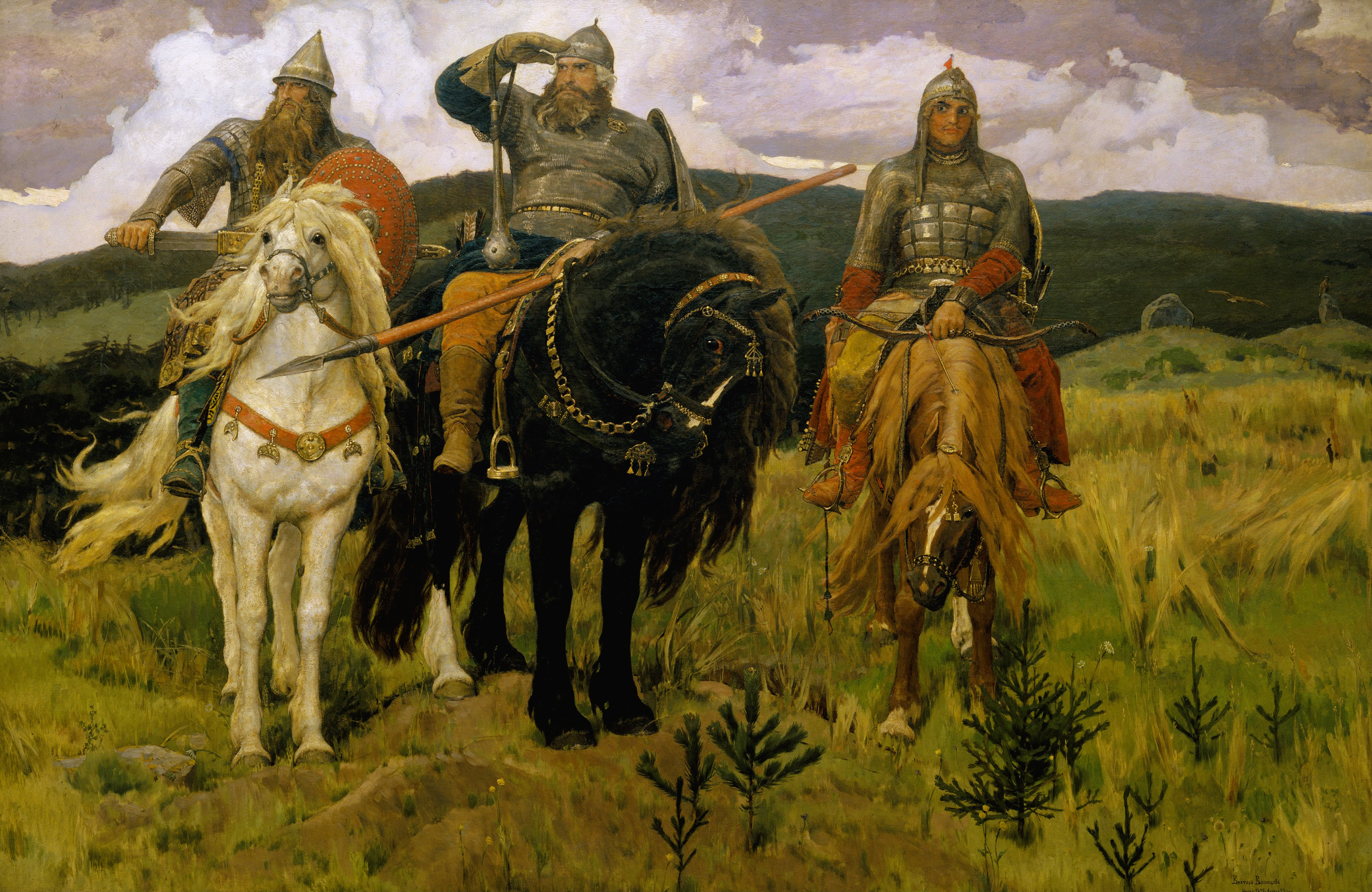
Bogatyrs (1898) (Note: One of Vasnetsov's most famous paintings, depicts mythical Russian knights Dobrynya Nikitich, Ilya Muromets and Alyosha Popovich.)

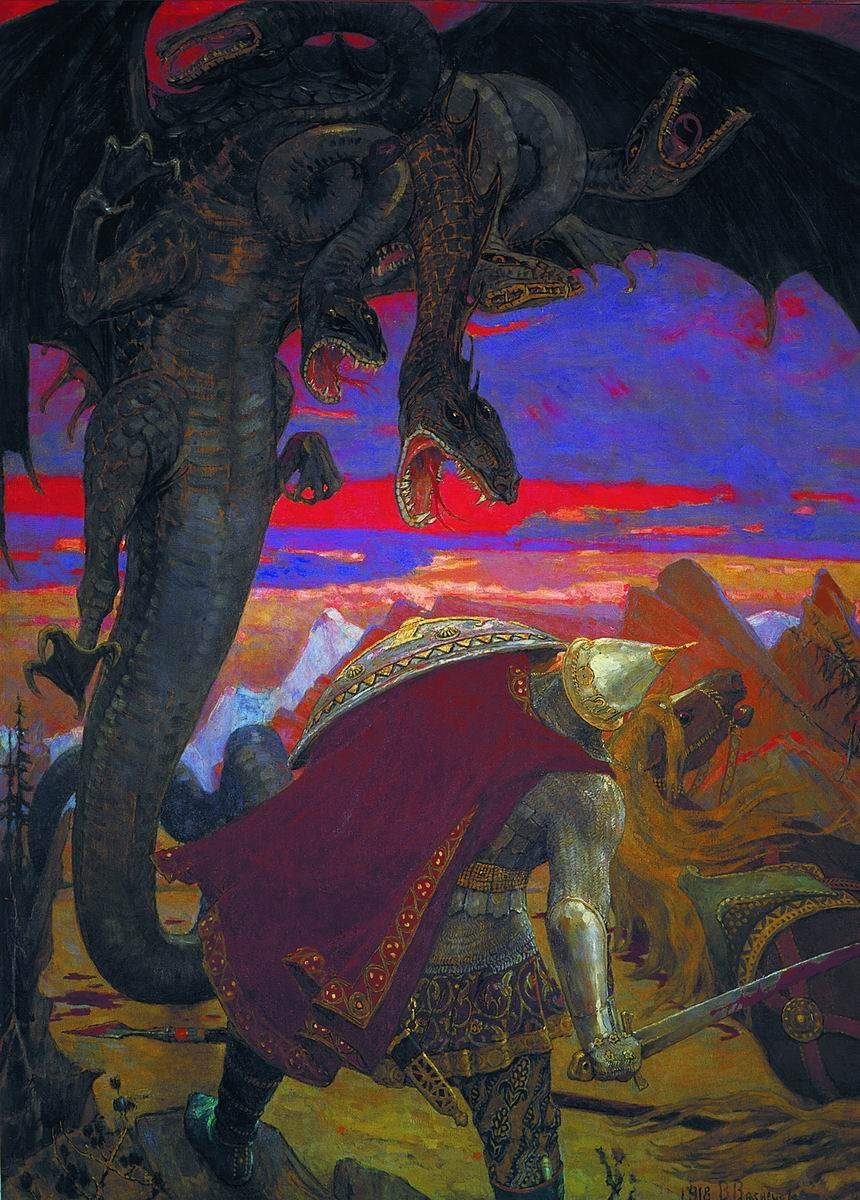
Dobrynya Nikitich's fight with the seven-headed Snake Gorynych (between 1913 and 1918)

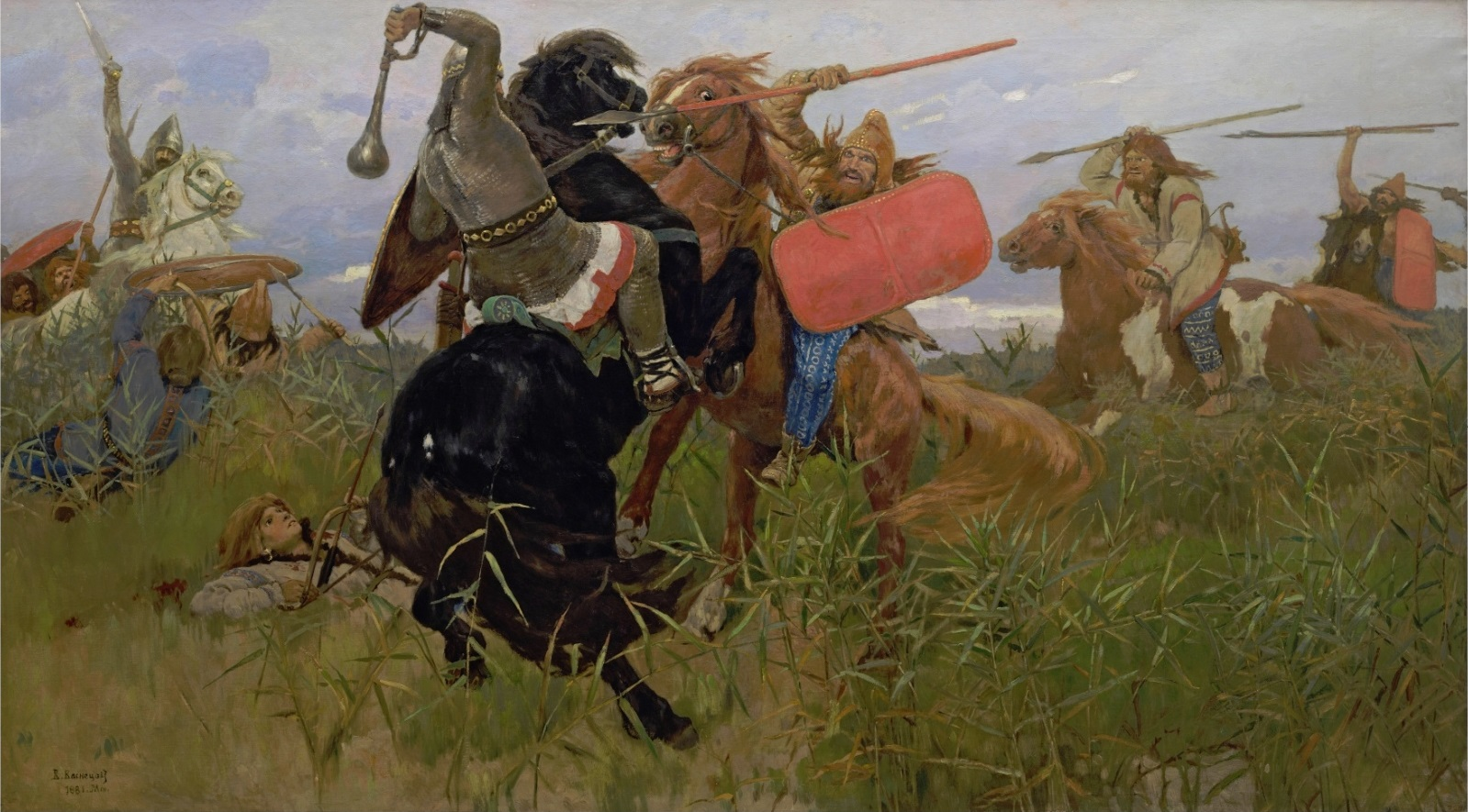
Battle between the Scythians and the Slavs (1881)

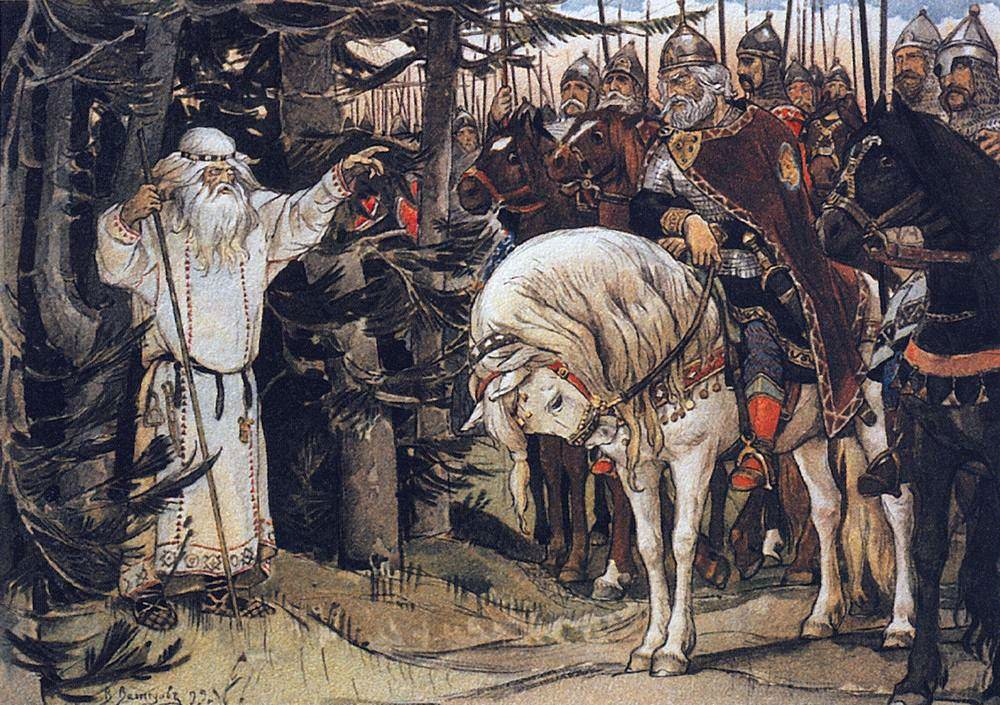
Oleg meets wizard (volkhv) (1899)

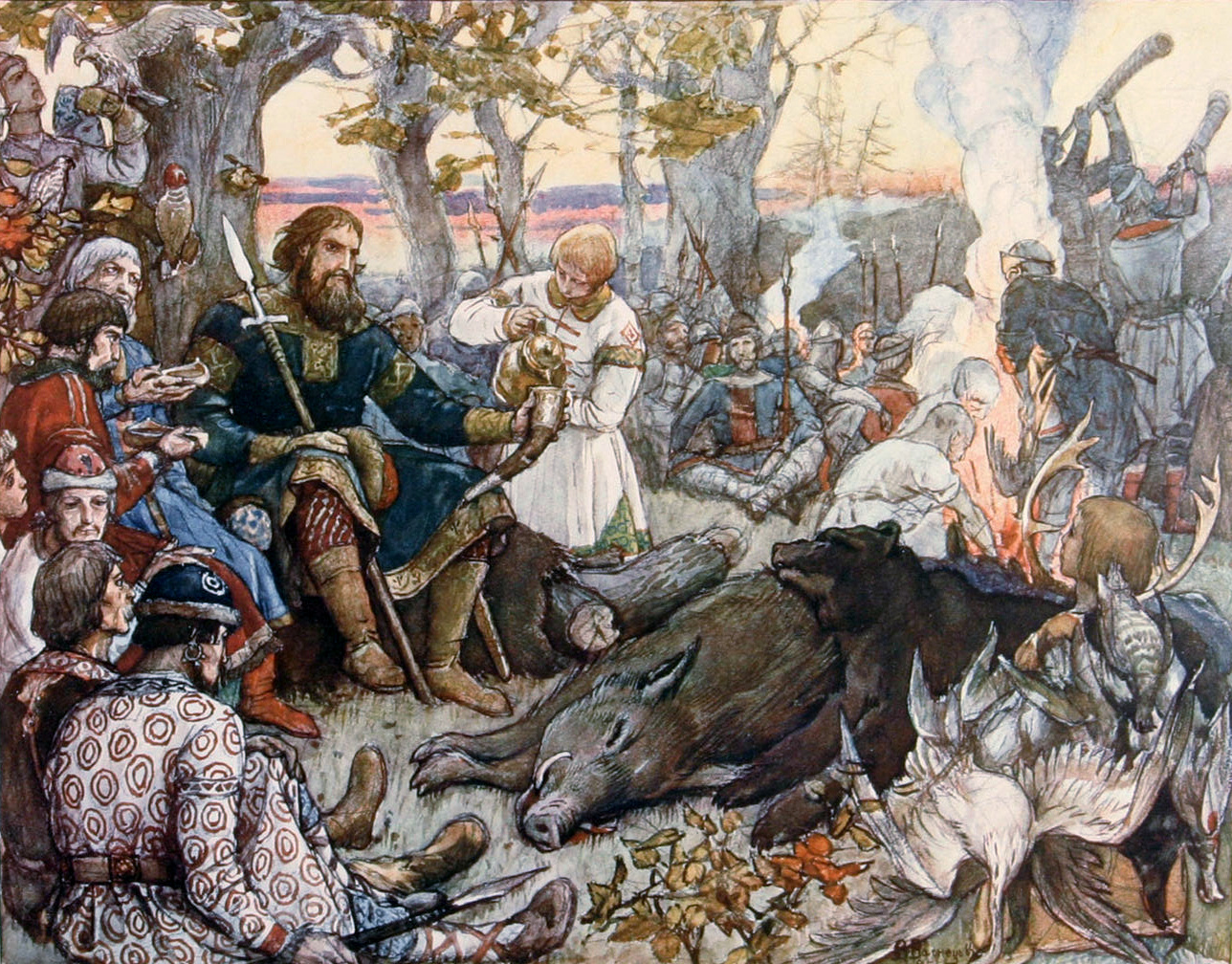
Monomakh's rest after hunting (1870)

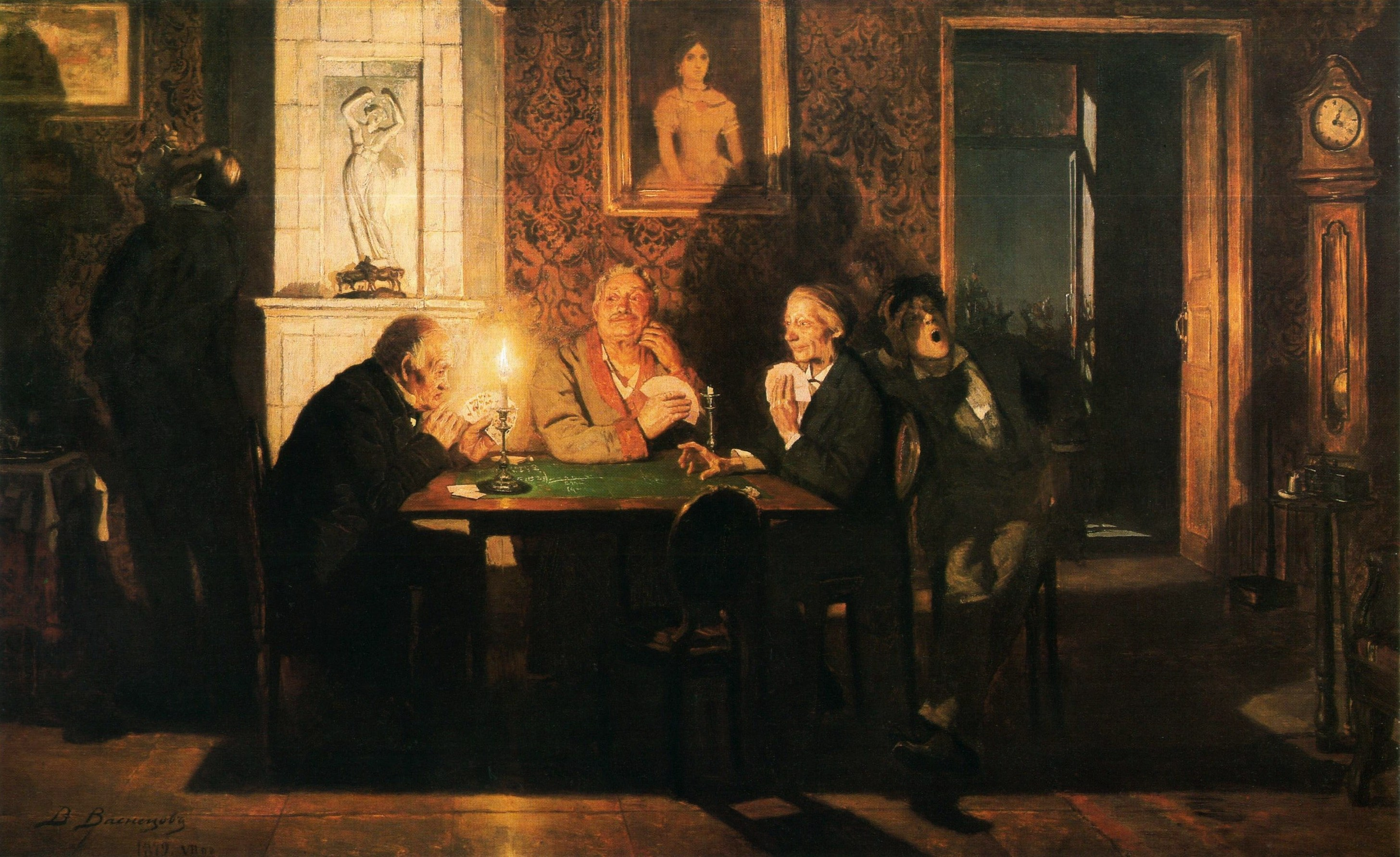
Préférence (1879)

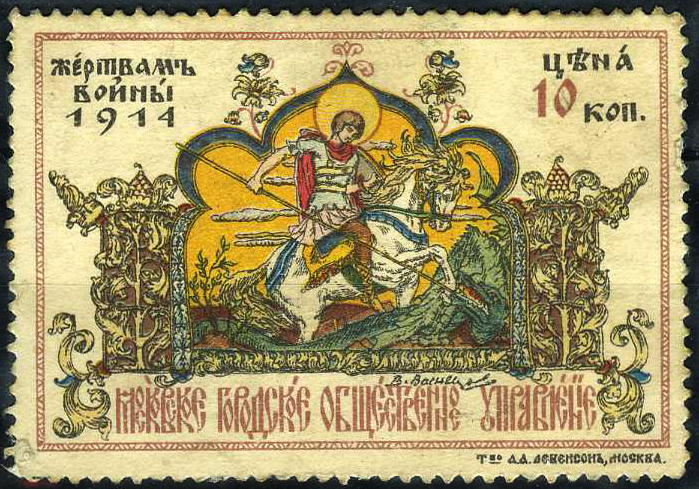
A revenue stamp of Russia, 1914
