= Ivan Tsarevich =

Hero of Russian folklore

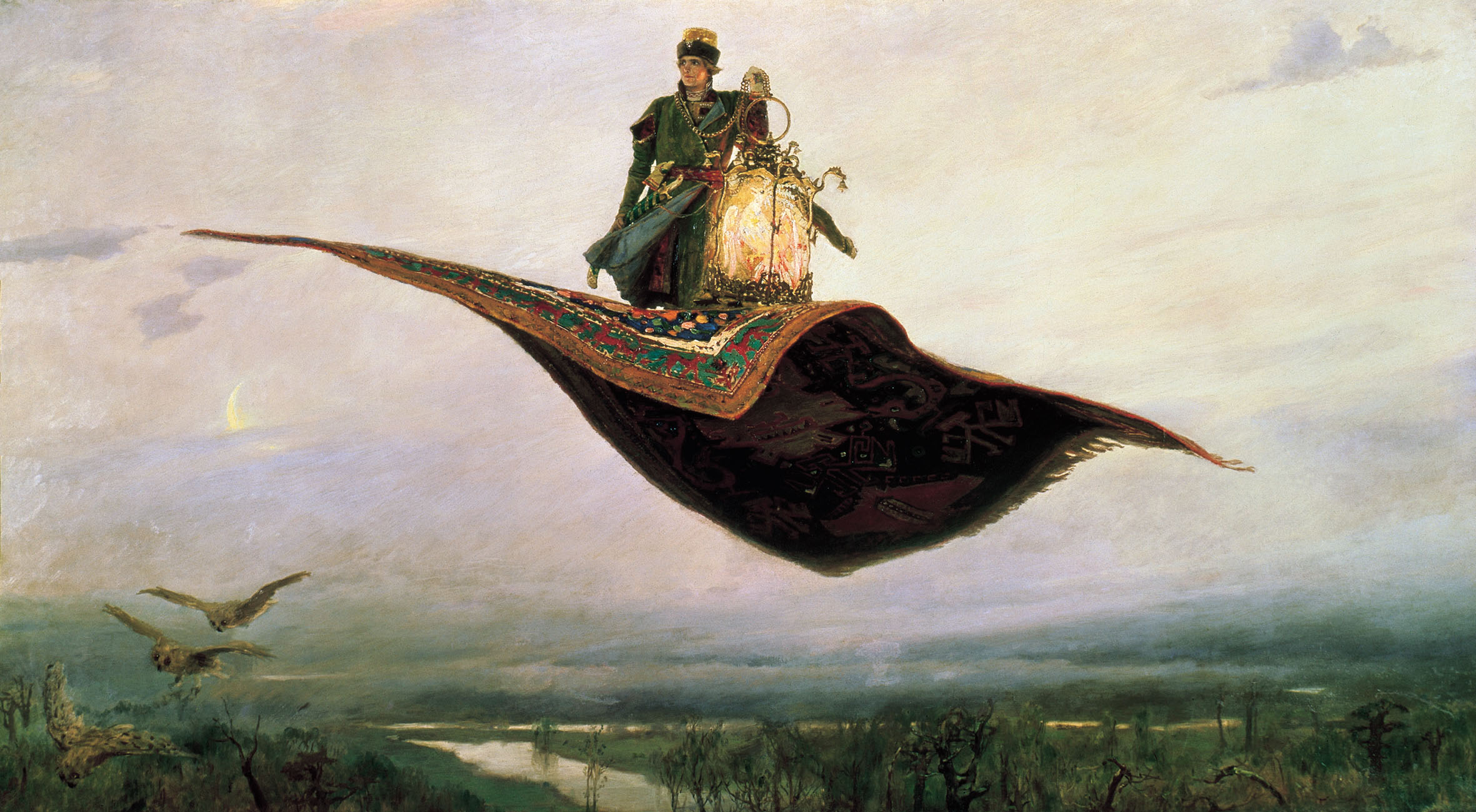
The Flying Carpet by Viktor Vasnetsov, 1880

Ivan Tsarevich (Russian: Ива́н Царе́вич or Иван-царевич) is one of the main heroes of Russian folklore, usually a protagonist, often engaged in a struggle with Koschei. Along with Ivan the Fool, Ivan Tsarevich is a placeholder name, meaning "Prince Ivan", rather than a definitive character. Tsarevich is a title given to the sons of tsars.

He is often, but not always, the youngest son of three. In the tale "The Three Tsardoms" he is a son of Nastasya the Golden Braid. Different legends describe Ivan with different wives, including Yelena the Beautiful, Vasilisa the Wise and Marya Morevna.

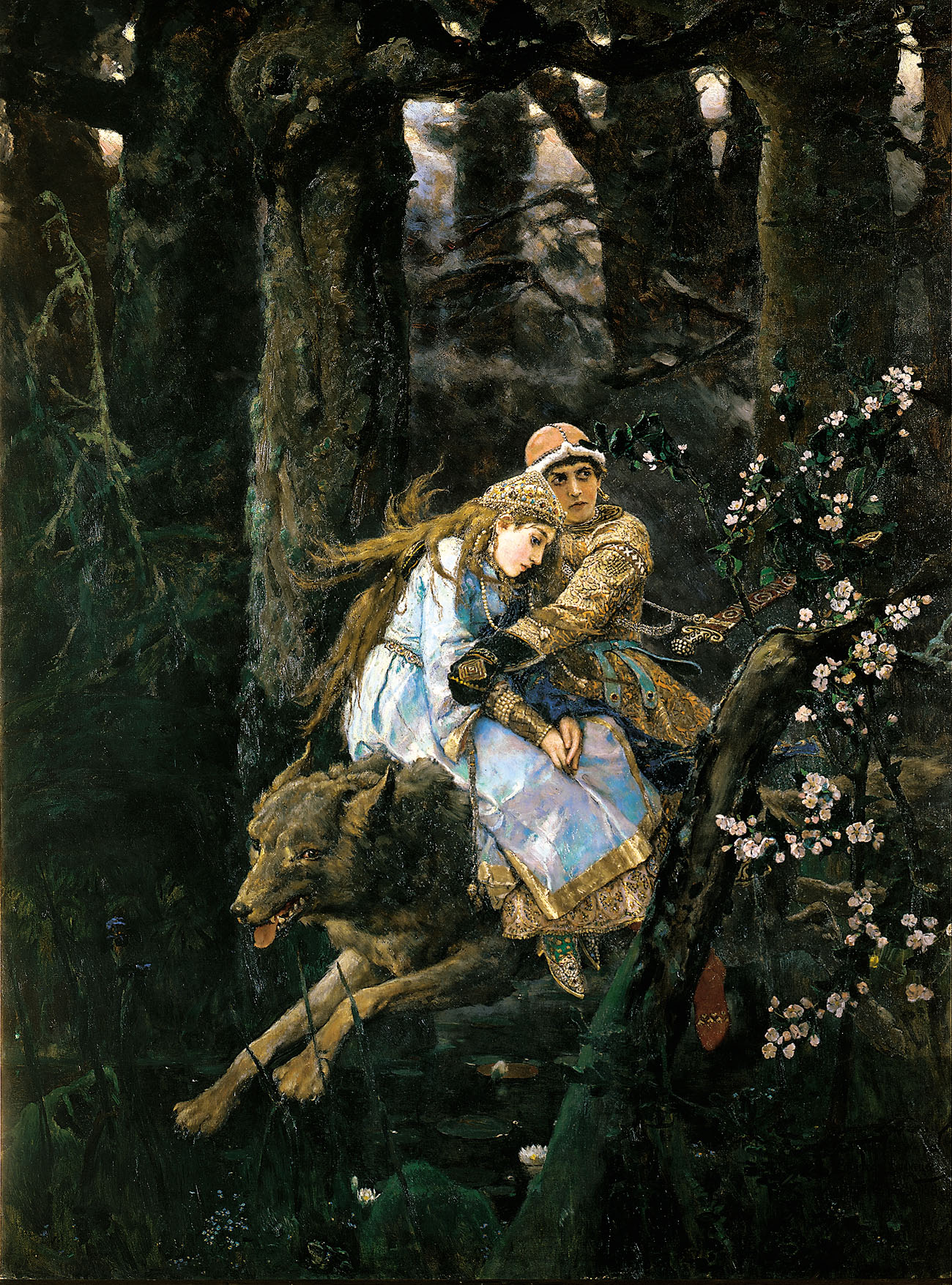
Ivan Tsarevich riding the Gray Wolf by 19th century artist Viktor Vasnetsov

Ivan is the main hero of multiple Russian folktales. He is almost always portrayed either as the third son of a peasant family or as the third son of a king. In the latter stories, he is called Ivan Tsarevich, which means "tsar's son". ("Ivan" is one of the most common Russian forenames.) The friends and foes of Ivan Tsarevich are often mythic figures, from magical animals to deathless beings. The most famous folktale featuring Ivan as the protagonist is "Tsarevitch Ivan, the Firebird and the Gray Wolf". In this story, a magical wolf aids Ivan as he captures the firebird and wins the hand of a beautiful tsarevna. The firebird inspired Igor Stravinsky's 1910 ballet of the same name. In another famous tale, part of which was also used by Stravinsky in The Firebird, Ivan Tsarevich married a warrior princess, Maria Morevna, who had been kidnapped by the immortal being called Koschei the Deathless. In this tale, the animal helpers were a lion, a bird and a magical horse that belonged to Baba Yaga. Mounted on this horse, Ivan defeats Koschei. Ivan the peasant's son has as many tales as Ivan Tsarevich. One of the best known is the story "the Little Humpbacked Horse", in which a magical talking horse helps Ivan to become a hero and to marry the princess he loves. Ivan Tsarevich is also mentioned in Fyodor Dostoevsky’s 1871 novel Demons, (also known as The Possessed or The Devils) as an identity to transform the protagonist, Nikolai Stavrogin into, and thus thrust him into legendary status as a mascot of the new regime.

Tales about Ivan Tsarevich include:

- "Ivan Tsarevich and the Grey Wolf"
- "Tsarevna the Frog"
- "The Sea Tsar and Vasilisa the Wise"
- "The Tale about Rejuvenating Apples and the Life Water"
- "The Death of Koschei the Immortal" (also known as "Marya Morevna")"

== See also ==
- Cossack
- Khanjali
