= Alyosha Popovich =

Folk hero in Russian folklore

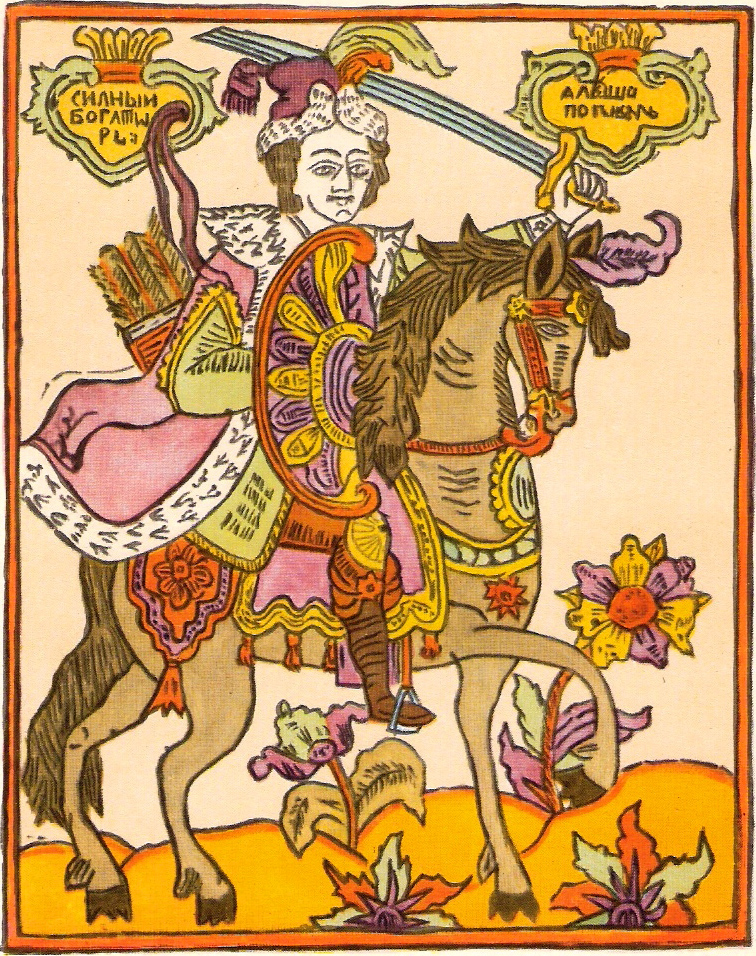
Strong bogatyr Alyosha Popovich. —From a lubok (popular print).

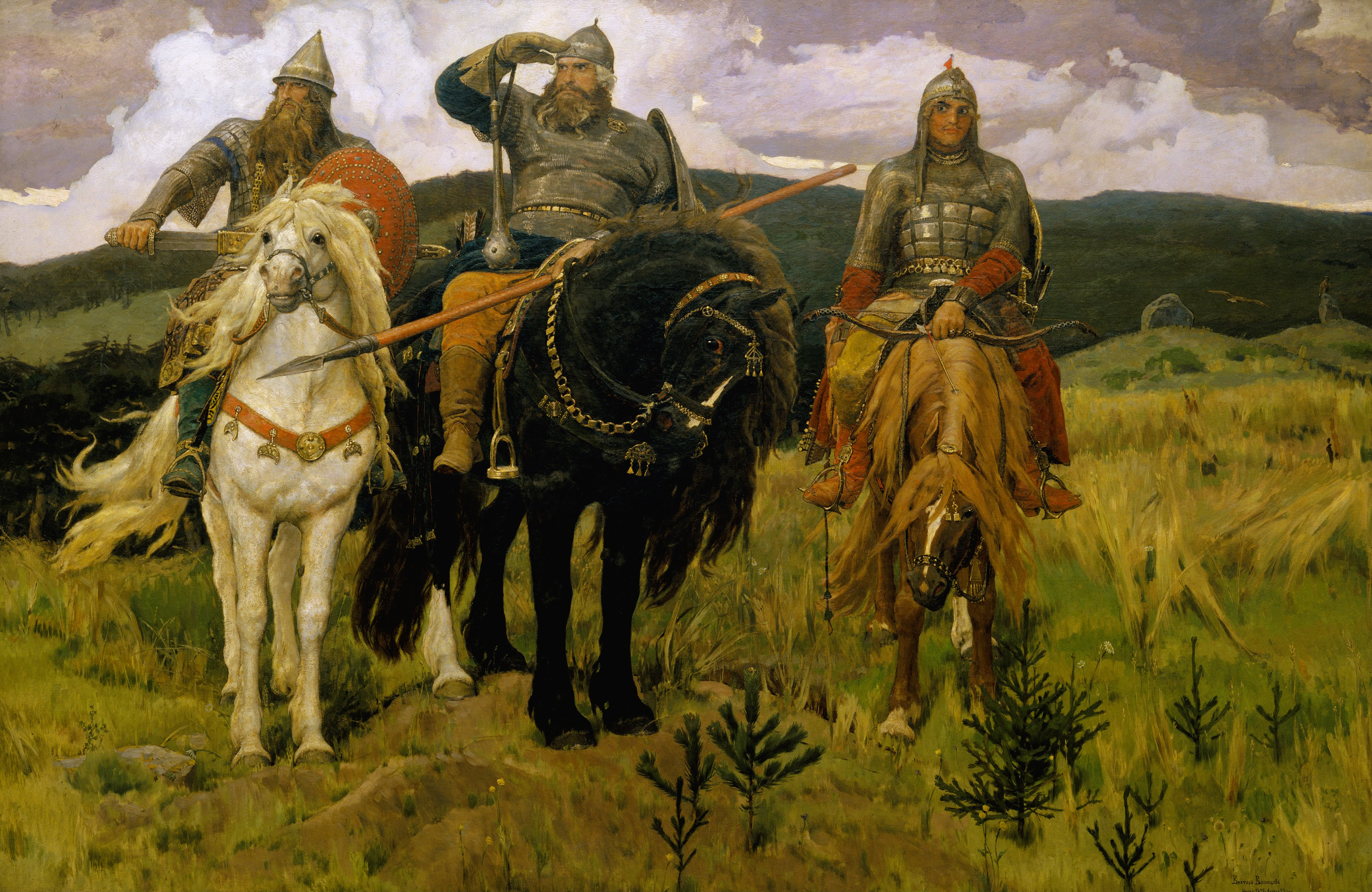
Bogatyrs (1898) by Viktor Vasnetsov: Alyosha Popovich is on the right.

Alyosha Popovich (Russian: Алёша Попович, lit. 'Alexey, son of the priest') is a hero in Russian folklore, appearing during the times of Kievan Rus'. He is a bogatyr (a medieval knight-errant) and the youngest of the three main bogatyrs, the other two being Dobrynya Nikitich and Ilya Muromets. All three are represented together in Viktor Vasnetsov's famous painting Bogatyrs (1898).

In byliny (Russian oral epic poems), he is described as a clever-minded priest's son who wins by tricking and outsmarting his foes. He defeated the dragon Tugarin Zmeyevich by trickery.

== Character ==
Alyosha Popovich is "noted for his slyness, agility, and craftiness, may be fun-loving, sometimes being depicted as a ‘mocker of women’, and may occasionally be a liar and a cheat", as described by James Bailey.

His tongue-lashings are attested by his mockery of Tugarin's gluttony and insult to the unfaithful Princess. His clever ruse was his disguise as a deaf pilgrim to make Tugarin approach him without caution. He then plays a practical joke by donning Tugarin's multicolored robe, (Note: Russian: "Платья с него снимал цветное на сто тысячей (v. 121).) tricking his squire into thinking it was Tugarin approaching Kiev as the victor.

== Alyosha Popovich and Tugarin ==
The bylina of "Alyosha Popovich" occurs in several versions. There is also the prose fairy tale version (Afanasyev #132 in Narodnye russkie skazki), which is a prosification of a bylina. A summary is as follows:

Alyosha Popovich and his squire, (Yekim Maryshko Paranov) travel from Rostov to Kiev and are welcomed by Prince Vladimir. There is a banquet, later joined by Tugarin Zemeyevich who acts boorishly. Tugarin shows no table manners, insults the prince, and consumes whole rounds of bread or an entire swan in huge gulps. Alyosha Popovich mocks Tugarin with an anecdote about an overfeeding cow that "choked on dregs" (or burst from overdrinking), and Tugarin throws a dagger at Alyosha, only for Yekim to catch it. Alyosha remarks how he has now obtained a dagger to carve Tugarin's heart with, but does not immediately act on it, or allow his squire to do so.

The next day Alyosha is challenged by Tugarin to a battle in an open field, but Tugarin uses his wings to fly in the air. Usually this is regarded as Tugarin assuming the guise of a winged dragon. But there is a case where the bylina says the wings were not growing out of Tugarin, and Alyosha spots paper wings attached to the horse. In either case, Alyosha prays to the Mother of God and Savior for rain to come to soak Tugarin's wings. Tugarin no longer can sustain flight and becomes earthbound, and the two begin the battle on the ground.

In the fairytale version, after their clubs are shattered and their lances shivered, Alyosha finishes Tugarin off with the knife from earlier, and severs his head. In the bylina used as example here, Alyosha strikes off Tugarin's head with a walking staff (or walking stick, Russian: палица) that weighs 90 pood, which was obtained when he exchanged his wardrobe with a pilgrim.

Due to Alyosha's victory he shreds Tugarin's body and celebrates by throwing up his head and catching it on his spear multiple times on the ride back to the castle. Seeing this barbaric act the king first believes that Tugarin won however he realizes that the victor was in fact Alyosha.

=== Variants ===
The bylina used in the above summary is No. 85 in Nikolai Onchukov (1904). (Note: Collected from Archangel Province.) It is the second version collected in this anthology, which contains the element of Alyosha exchanging clothes with a pilgrim, but does not elaborate on how he employs the disguise to trick Tugarin, as occurs in the first version. In another version (Danilov), Alyosha lowers Tugarins guard with the pilgrim's disguise, pretending to be a (kalêka) who is hard of hearing. A kalêka (калика) was a wandering psalm-singer who was oftentimes crippled.

This long version collected by Kirsha Danilov (his No. 20, in 344 lines), two stories of Tugarin's are concatenated in the same song. Isabel Florence Hapgood has translated this in full. Nora K. Chadwick translated the first encounter, but eschews that remaining 215 lines of the second encounter.

Some versions more starkly allude to Vladmir's wife Princess Apraxia (Apraksevna, etc.) being completely seduced by "Young Tugarin Zemeyevich", and she reproaches Alyosha for leaving her bereft of her "dear friend" at the end of the song, as in Danilov's long version. Alyosha's subsequent repartee to the princess was: "Hail, Princess Aprakseyevna! I almost called you a bitch, A bitch and a wayward wench! There's the tale for you, and there's the deed". (Note: Hapgood does not use the offending word but uses the circumlocution "the name which thou hast merited".)

There are some versions of the byliny recorded which has added a historical veneer so that the dragon has been more explicitly recast as "a traditional Tatar enemy of Kiev".

One explanation for the amount of different variations of the story of Alyosha and Tugarin is due to the story being a combination of three distinct stories. This is further supported by variations of this story having events out of order or even repeated.

=== Historical perspective ===
Alyosha Popovich may have been based on a historical Alexander Popovich of Rostov, who served prince Vsevolod the Big Nest and died in 1223 in the Battle of the Kalka River against the Mongols, according to the Nikon Chronicle. Nora K. Chadwick writing in 1932 stated that the historicity of the figure was assured. However, a later commentator raised the specter that the figure may not have existed, his name merely a 15th-century interpolation into the chronicles by influence of epic poetry.

Popovich means "Priest's Son." In the wondertale, his father is introduced as both "prebendary Leon" or "Leon the Priest". The father's name has also been rendered "Priest Levonty" or "Cathedral Priest Leonty". He may be modeled after a Bishop Leonty who was killed in 1071 in a pagan uprising. (Note: Alyosha's father is Fedor (Fyodor) in the Danilov version. Bailey refers to a possible historical model for this as well.)

Another early source for the historical Alexander Popovich is a povest or story in a MS from Tver, which records his servant named Torop, matching Trofim who replaces Yekim as squire in a bylina variant.

Soviet (Russian) historian Boris Rybakov, among others, has written that this bylina reflected the victory of Vladimir Monomakh over the Polovetsian commander Tugor-khan.

=== Analysis ===
"Alyosha Popovich" is classified under its own type in the East Slavic Folktale Classification (Russian: СУС, romanized: SUS): SUS -650D*, Russian: Алеша Попович, romanized: Alyosha Popovich, closely placed with other tale types about strong heroes. The East Slavic Classification registers variants only from Russian sources.

== Depictions ==
Alyosha features in the humorous tale Foma Berennikov from Alexander Afanasyev's Russian Fairy Tales, in which the main protagonist is Foma, while Alyosha Popovich and Ilya Muromets act as his sidekicks. Eventually Foma defeats the Chinese champion-warrior and the whole Chinese army by a sheer luck: "...And Foma Berennikov married the beautiful princess. Apparently, it's not only the bogatyrs who are lucky! The one who brags about himself the most gets the best."

In 18th century, Vasily Lyovshin published a tale based on folkloric motives, Повесть о Алеше Поповиче – богатыре, служившем князю Владимиру, 'The Tale of Alyosha Popovich, a hero who served Prince Vladimir'.

Alyosha features as a seсondary character in a number of Russian fantasy movies such as Ilya Muromets, Real Fairy Tale, Last Knight, among others.

Alyosha is one of the main characters in the Bogatyrs animated film series by Melnitsa Animation Studio. He is the main protagonist in the 2004 animated comedy Alyosha Popovich and Tugarin Zmey by Konstantin Bronzit and also appears in the series of its sequels, sharing screen with Ilya Muromets and Dobrynya Nikitich.

Alyosha Popovich is the member of Vladimir Monomakh's armed force in Vadim Nikolayev's historical novel Bogatyr's Armed Force of Monomakh. Rus' in the Fire! (2014).
