= Sadko (disambiguation) =

Sadko is a Russian mythical hero.

Sadko may also refer to:

- Sadko (musical tableau), an 1867 symphonic poem by Nikolai Rimsky-Korsakov
- Sadko (painting), an 1876 painting by Ilya Repin
- Sadko (opera), an 1896 opera by Rimsky-Korsakov
- Sadko (film), a 1953 film by Aleksandr Ptushko
- Sadko (icebreaker), several ships
- Sadko (submarine), a Russian civilian submarine built in 1997
- GAZ Sadko, a Russian-built cargo truck
- Matisse & Sadko, a Russian Music Group.
