= List of pieces which use the octatonic scale =

Compositions using the octatonic scale:

- Radiohead

"Just" (1995). Jonny Greenwood plays a series of OCT02 scales on the guitar during the intro (0:06-0:16) and each chorus (0:55-1:05, 1:44-1:55, 2:47-3:09)

- Béla Bartók

Harvest Song (Ara táskor) Violin Duo # 33

- Frederic Chopin

Ballade No. 1 in G Minor, Op. 23 : (bars 130-132)
Etude in F Minor, Op. 10, No. 9: (bars 28-30)

- Charles Ives

The Unanswered Question (solo trumpet part)

- Julian Cochran

Piano Sonata No. 1 (1st mov.)
Fire Dance
Animation Suite, Tin Sentinel
Animation Suite, Clockwork Doll
Trio for violin, oboe and piano, Artemis (2nd mov.)
Prelude No. 9
Mazurka No. 1

- Madeleine Dring

Lilliburlero Variations for Two Pianos

- Prince Edmond de Polignac

Échos de l'Orient judaïque (1879)
"Chant à la lune", incidental music to Salammbô (1886)

- Joseph Haydn

String Quartet in F minor, Op. 20 No. 5

- The Human Abstract

"Digital Veil" (2011)

- King Crimson
  "Red" (1974).
- Nirvana

"Oh, the Guilt" (1993) (verses)
"Blandest" (1988) (verses)

- Procol Harum
  "Whaling Stories" on Procol Harum – Live In New York (April 1971)
- Zoltán Kodály

Sonata for Violoncello and Piano, Mov. II (1910)

- Sergei Rachmaninoff

Trio élégiaque No. 2

- Nikolai Rimsky-Korsakov

Sadko (1867)

- Arnold Schoenberg

Piano Piece, Op. 23, no. 3 (1923)

- Franz Schubert

Symphony No. 8, 1st mvt., bars 13-20
Piano Sonata in C major, D 840 (Schubert), 1st mvt bars 33-39

- Alexander Scriabin

Prelude Op. 74, No. 3 (1914)
Piano Sonata No. 9, Op. 68 (1912-13), melody from bar 5 onwards

- Juan Maria Solare

Octango (2005)
Transfuga

- Igor Stravinsky

Petroushka (1911)
The Rite of Spring (1913)
Les Noces (1923)
Symphony of Psalms (1930)
Agon, "Pas de deux" (1957)

- Kenneth Leighton

Magnificat from the Second Service, Op. 62 (1972)

- Toru Takemitsu

Distance de Fée, SJ1050 (1951)

- Die Antwoord

Fok julle Naaiers (2011). Piano line in the intro is octatonic, bass synth adds a ninth tone.

- Adi Morag

"Octabones" (1999)

- Orbital

Oolaa from the Green Album

- Suraj Synthesist Khayaal , a lil fantasy
- Gilad Hochman

Closer for two alto saxophones (2022)
Polarizations for solo viola (2023)

- Dream Theater

The Dark eternal night
