= Sadko (opera) =

Opera by Nikolai Rimsky-Korsakov

- Opera by Nikolai Rimsky-Korsakov
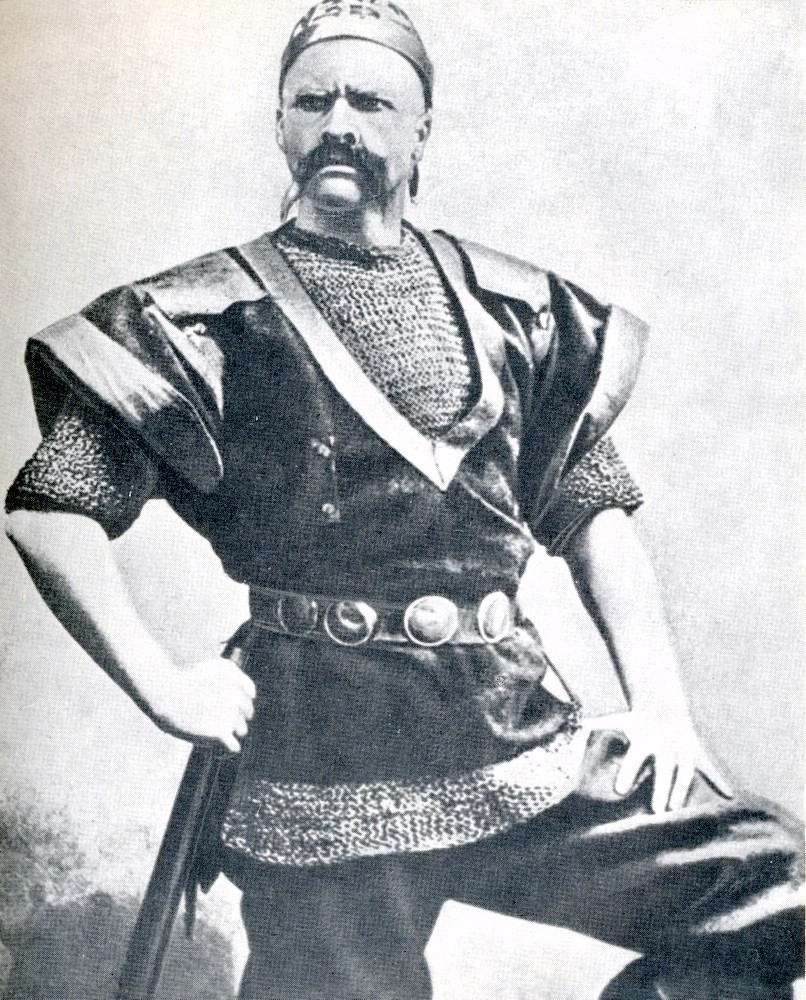
- Feodor Chaliapin as the Varangian Guest, in 1897
- Native title: Russian: Садко
- Librettist: Rimsky-Korsakov; Vladimir Belsky; Vladimir Stasov
- Language: Russian
- Premiere: 7 January 1898; Solodovnikov Theatre, Moscow

Sadko (Russian: Садко, romanized: Sadkó, the name of the main character) is an 1898 opera in seven scenes by Nikolai Rimsky-Korsakov. The libretto was written by the composer, with assistance from Vladimir Belsky, Vladimir Stasov, and others. Rimsky-Korsakov was first inspired by the bylina of Sadko in 1867, when he completed a tone poem on the subject, his Op. 5. After finishing his second revision of this work in 1891, he decided to turn it into a dramatic work.

The music is highly evocative, and Rimsky-Korsakov's famed powers of orchestration are abundantly evident throughout the score. According to the Soviet critic Boris Asafyev, writing in 1922, Sadko constitutes the summit of Rimsky-Korsakov's craft. From the opus 5 tone poem the composer quoted its most memorable passages, including the opening theme of the swelling sea, and other themes as leitmotives – he himself set out to "utilize for this opera the material of my symphonic poem, and, in any event, to make use of its motives as leading motives for the opera".

== Performance history ==
The composer was closely involved in the "assiduous" rehearsals, and he "drilled the orchestra with great care, together with [the conductor] Esposito who proved a very fair musician". Rimsky also corrected errors in the score and worked hard with the chorus. Apart from the Sea Tsar singer "whom I could not endure" he approved of all the solo singers and singled out Zabyela, who "sang magnificently" and Syekar-Rozhanski.

The world premiere took place on 7 January 1898 (O.S. 26 December 1897), presented by the Russian Private Opera at the Solodovnikov Theatre in Moscow. Its conductor was Eugenio Esposito, the brother of Michele Esposito, with scenic designers Konstantin Korovin and Sergey Malyutin. The production was financed by the railway tycoon Savva Mamontov; this was the first time that one of Rimsky-Korsakov's operas was staged by a commercial theatre rather than the Imperial Theatres. The St. Petersburg premiere followed 26 January 1901 at the Mariinsky Theatre, conducted by Eduard Nápravník, with scenic design by Apollinary Vasnetsov.

In 1906, the opera was presented at the Bolshoi Theatre in Moscow conducted by Vyacheslav Suk, with scenic design by Konstantin Korovin. The first US performance occurred at the Metropolitan Opera in New York on 25 January 1930 in French with Tullio Serafin, followed a year later by the first performance in London in June 1931.

A truncated production was mounted in Monte Carlo in 1921, conducted by Victor de Sabata, with Dimitri Smirnov in the title role. Revivals took place at the Bolshoi in 1935, 1949 and 1963. A production at the Berlin Staatsoper in 1947 featured Ludwig Suthaus, Erna Berger and Margarete Klose. Aleksandr Ptushko directed a film of the opera in 1952 with the music but without singing. A new production by Alexei Stepaniuk for the Mariinsky Theatre in 1993 was later toured to Paris (Théâtre des Champs-Élysées) and recorded.

Sadko is rarely performed today outside the Russian Federation. However, there have been recent performances by Opera Vlaanderen and in Bratislava.

== Roles ==
Role	Voice type	Premiere cast Moscow, 7 January 1898 (Conductor: Eugenio Esposito)	Premiere cast St. Petersburg, 26 January 1901 (Conductor: Eduard Nápravník)
Foma Nazarich, doyen, elder of Novgorod	tenor		
Luka Zinovich, governor, elder of Novgorod	bass		Vladimir Mayboroda
Sadko, gusli-player and singer in Novgorod	tenor	Anton Sekar-Rozhansky	Aleksandr Davïdov
Lyubava Buslayevna, his young wife	mezzo-soprano	Aleksandra Rostovtseva	Nina Fride
Nezhata, young gusli-player from Kiev	contralto	Varvara Strakhova	Mariya Dolina
Duda, skomorokh	bass	Aleksandr Brevi	
Sopel, skomorokh	tenor		
The Varangian, overseas guest	bass	I. Aleksanov	Aleksandr Antonovsky
The Indian, overseas guest	tenor	Yekab Karklin	Mitrofan Chuprïnnikov
The Venetian, overseas guest	baritone	I. Petrov	Aleksandr Smirnov
Ocean-Sea, the Sea Tsar	bass	Anton Bedlevich	Konstantin Serebryakov
Volkhova, the beautiful princess; his youngest, favorite daughter	soprano	Emilia Negrin-Schmidt	Adelaida Bolska
The Apparition, a mythic mighty warrior in the guise of a pilgrim	baritone		
Chorus, silent roles: Merchants of Novgorod, wandering minstrels, sailors, maidens, inhabitants of the undersea tsardom, people

== Synopsis ==
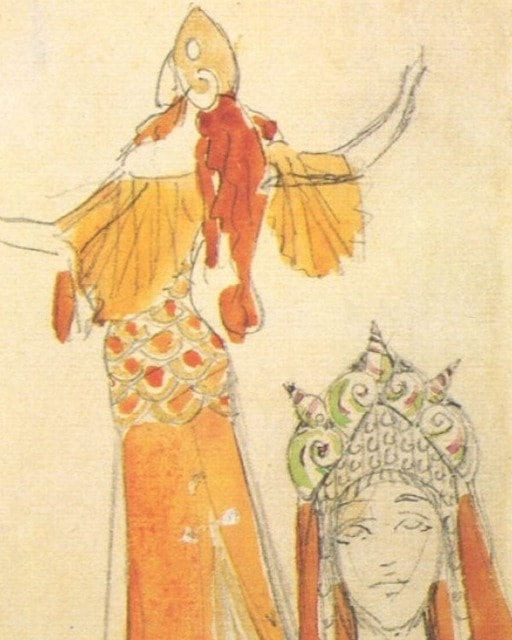
Volkhova costume design by Mikhail Vrubel, 1897

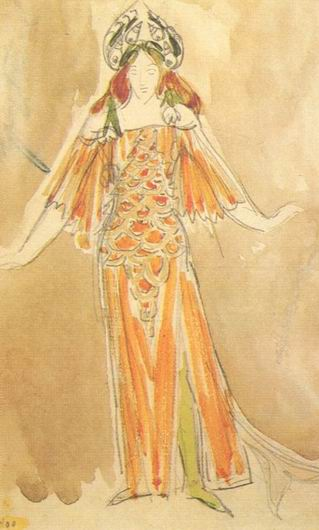
Volkhova costume design by Mikhail Vrubel, 1897

(Note: Instead of traditional acts, Sadko is divided in seven scenes, and, as that type of structure would suggest, is more loosely constructed than a traditional opera. The opera is usually performed in three or five acts, depending on how the scenes are grouped: Three acts – 1–2, 3–4, 5–6–7 or 1–2–3, 4, 5–6–7: Five acts – 1, 2–3, 4, 5–6, 7)

Time: The historical figure Sadko lived in the 12th century.
Place: The action takes place in Novgorod and in the legendary realm of the Sea Tsar.

The opera tells the story of Sadko, a gusli player (guslar), who leaves his wife, Lubava, and home in Novgorod and eventually returns a wealthy man. During his years of travel he amasses a fortune, weds the daughter of the Tsar and Tsarina of the Ocean and has other adventures. Upon his return, the city and Lubava rejoice.

Scene 1 – The rich mansion of a guild in Novgorod

The wealthy Novgorod merchants congratulate themselves on their prosperity. Nezhata, a gusli player from Kiev, sings an heroic song. In reply, Sadko also sings, but the merchants laugh at him when he suggests that Novgorod would be more prosperous if a river joined Lake Ilmen to the ocean.

Scene 2 – The shores of Lake Ilmen

Sadko wanders unhappily by the lakeside. His singing attracts some swans, one of which changes into Volkhova, the Sea Princess, who wishes to marry a mortal. She explains to Sadko how to catch three golden fish which will lead to his fortune after a long voyage. The Princess promises to him to wait patiently for his return. At dawn, from the lake the voice of the Sea-Tsar is heard. He calls his daughters home into the depths. The girls once again turn into white swans and swim away into the distance.

Scene 3 – An attic in Sadko's home (in Novgorod)

Sadko's wife, Lubava, is missing her husband. She is happy when he comes home at last, but distressed when he announces his intention to leave immediately in order to seek his fortune.

Scene 4 – A pier in Novgorod (on the banks of Lake Ilmen)

"The Song of the Indian Guest"
1929 recording of transcription for violin and piano, featuring violinist Váša Příhoda

Merchants assemble at the quayside and Nezhata sings another gusli song. The merchants deride Sadko when he explains how he will win his fortune by catching three golden fish. Sadko bets them that he can do this, and, after he is successful in catching the fish, he wins their ships to take on his voyage. He sets about gathering a crew for his voyage. Three visiting merchants, a Viking, an Indian and a Venetian, sing in turn of their homelands (Song of India). Sadko decides to set sail for Venice.

Scene 5 – A peaceful expanse of the ocean

Sadko's fleet of ships is returning home, laden with treasure, but becomes becalmed. Sadko's crew throw treasure over the side to propitiate the Sea-Tsar, but no wind appears. Sadko is left behind, clinging to a log, when the wind suddenly picks up while he is overboard.

Scene 6 – In the depths of the sea

The scene shifts to the realm of the sea-Tsar, where Sadko sings to the Tsar and tsarina, winning the hand of their daughter, Volkhova. The wedding celebrations become so boisterous that a storm springs up, sinking ships on the surface of the sea, and the realm of the Sea-Tsar is destroyed. The end of the reign of the pagan tsar is heralded by an apparition of a Christian pilgrim (actually St Nicholas of Mozhaysk). Sadko and Volkhova escape the destruction on a sea-shell.

Scene 7 – Novogrod, a green meadow on the shores of Lake Ilmen

Sadko is asleep by the lakeside. Volkhova watches over him and sings a lullaby. Before he wakes, she bids him farewell and then disappears, becoming changed into the River Volkhova that now links Lake Ilmen with the sea. Lubava finds her husband asleep and wakes him: he believes that his voyage was nothing but a dream, but the sight of the new river and his fleet of ships convinces him that he really is now a very wealthy man.

== Principal arias and numbers ==
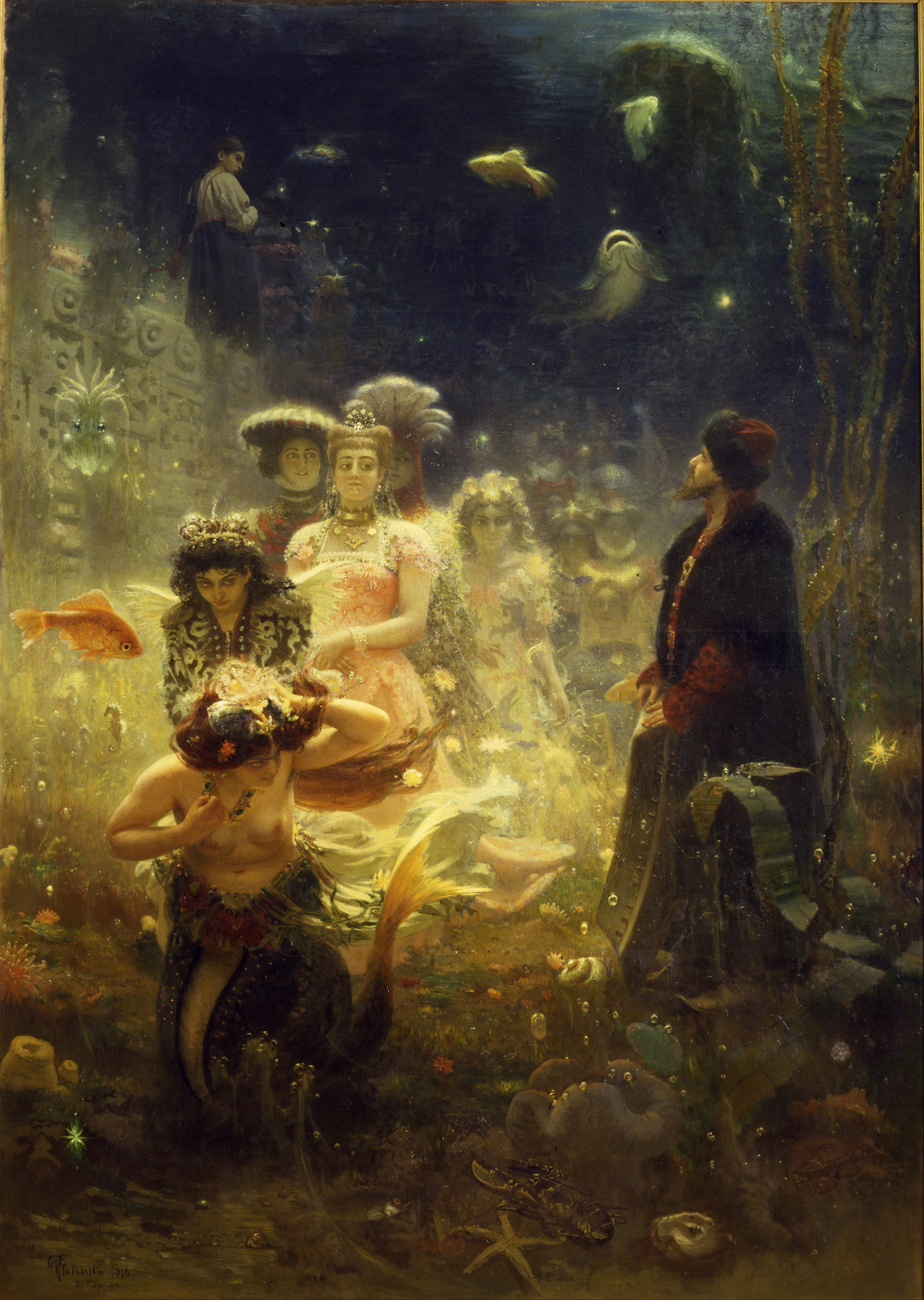
Sadko, painting by Ilya Repin (1876)

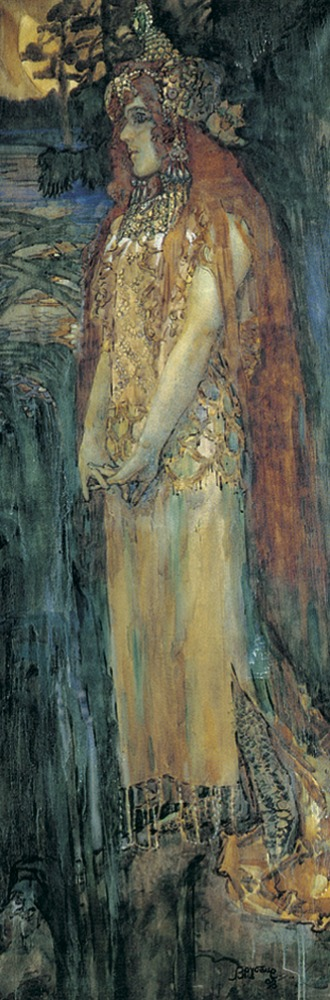
Nadezhda Zabela-Vrubel as Volkhova by Mikhail Vrubel, 1898

- Three arias fit into the plot as descriptions by foreign merchants of their respective countries.
  - Song of the Varangian Guest (Песня Варяжского гостя), or "Song of the Viking Guest"
  - Song of the Indian Guest (Песня Индийского гостя)
  - Song of the Venetian Guest (Песня Веденецкого гостя)
- Volkhova's Lullaby (Колыбельная Волховы)

== Recordings ==
- 1950, Nikolai Golovanov (conductor), USSR Bolshoi Theatre Soloists, Chorus and Orchestra, Georgi Nalepp (Sadko), Yelizaveta Shumskaya (Volkhova), Vera Davydova (Lyubava), Sergei Krasovsky (Sea Tsar), Yelizaveta Antonova (gusli-player), Sergei Koltypin (Buffoon 1), Alexei Peregudov (Buffoon 2), Tikhon Chernyakov (Novgorod head), Stephan Nikolau (voyvode), Mark Reizen (Viking merchant), Ivan Kozlovsky (Indian merchant), Pavel Lisitsian (Venetian merchant), Ilya Bogdanov (Mighty Old Man). (Melodiya LP M10 01480, 4 records; Preiser Mono 90655, 3 discs; Naxos Classical Archives 9.80931-33).
- 1994, Valery Gergiev (conductor), Kirov Orchestra and Chorus of the Marijinski Theater, St. Petersburg, Vladimir Galouzine (Sadko), Valentina Tsidipova (Volkhova), Marianna Tarassova (Lyubava), Sergei Aleksashkin (Sea Tsar). (Philips CD 442 138–2, 3 discs; reissued as part of Decca set Rimsky-Korsakov: 5 Operas 478 2705, 11 discs, but without text or translation).

=== Video ===
- 1980 live performance: Yuri Simonov (conductor), Orchestra & Chorus of the Bolshoi Theatre. Vladimir Atlantov (Sadko), Tamara Milashkina (Volkhova), Irina Arkhipova (Lyubava), Boris Morozov (Sea Tsar), Alexandre Ognivstev (Viking Guest), Lev Kuznetsov (Indian Guest), Alexander Voroshilo (Venetian Merchant). Mono. 173 minutes. (DVD VAI 4512; Classound DVD CLASS 001)
- 1994, Valery Gergiev (conductor), Kirov Orchestra and Chorus of the Marijinski Theater (artist details as for CD version listed)
- 2020 live performance: Timor Zangiev (conductor), Bolshoi Theatre Orchestra and Chorus. Nazhmiddin Mavlyanov (Sadko), Aida Garifullina (Volkhova), Ekaterina Semenchuk (Lyubava), Stanislav Trofimov (Sea Tsar), Dmitry Ulianov (Varangian Guest), Alexey Nekludov (Indian Guest), Andrey Zhilikhovsky (Venetian Merchant). 186 minutes, Blu-Ray BelAir BAC 488.

== Related works ==
- Rimsky-Korsakov's earlier symphonic poem Sadko, Op. 5 (1867), may be regarded as a precursor to the opera, as it is based on the same story and the opera incorporates several musical ideas from the orchestral work. There are three versions:
1. Episode from the Bïlina of Sadko (1867)
2. Musical Tableau–Sadko (1869)
3. Musical Tableau–Sadko (1892)

== Adaptations ==
In 1922 the English composer Kaikhosru Shapurji Sorabji wrote a pastiche on the "Hindu Merchant's Song" as the third of his Three Pastiches for Piano. In 1953, a Russian film directed by Aleksandr Ptushko entitled Sadko based on the opera and featuring Rimsky-Korsakov's music was released. The 1953 Soviet biopic Rimsky-Korsakov features pieces of the opera. Tommy Dorsey's 1938 instrumental arrangement of the "Song of the Indian Guest" is a jazz classic, compiled on This Is Tommy Dorsey & His Orchestra, Vol. 1.
