= Chernava =

Daughter of the Sea Tsar in the epic of Sadko

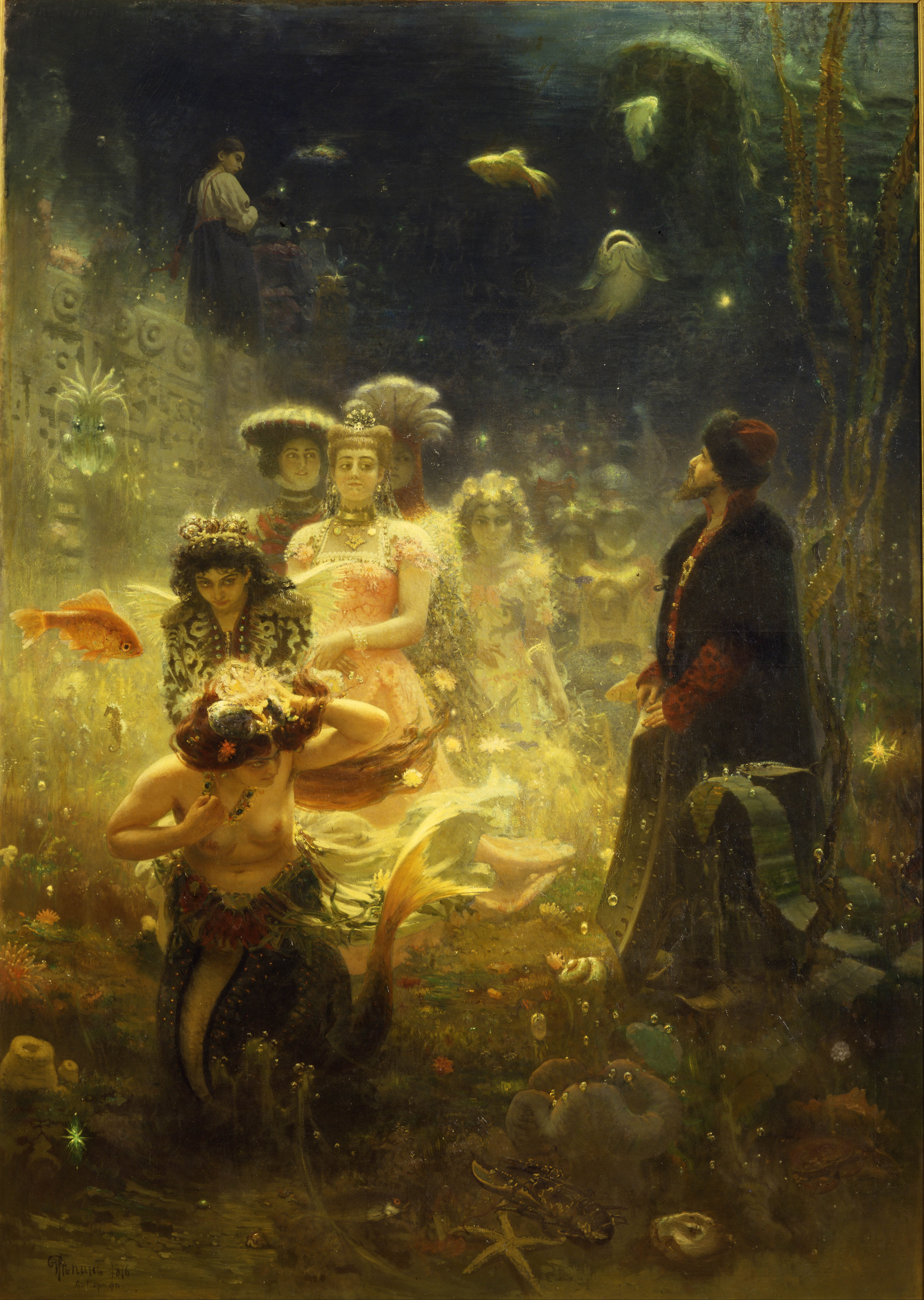
Sadko by Ilya Repin

In Russian folklore, Chernava (diminutive: Chernavushka; Russian: Чернава, Чернавушка) is Sea Tsar's daughter (or, according to some versions, a niece), spirit and personification of the river of the same name. She is a mermaid. Her head and upper body are human, while the lower body is a fish's tail. Chernava is famed from her appearance in the epic of Sadko.

== In Sadko ==
In the Sadko bylina, Chernava appears as one of the 900 mermaids offered to Sadko as a new bride, though to consummate the marriage would mean that Sadko would no longer be able to go to the human world. She is described as small, scrawny, and young girl who works as a servant in the palace. When Morskoy Tsar offered Sadko a new bride, Sadko took Chernava and lay down beside her. On their wedding night he did not touch her. When Sadko was asleep, Chernava had transformed into a river, helping him to get into the human world. Sadko woke up on the shore of the river Chernava and rejoined his first wife.

== In popular culture ==
Chernava Colles, the hills on planet Venus are named after her.
