= Sadko (painting) =

1876 painting by Ilya Repin

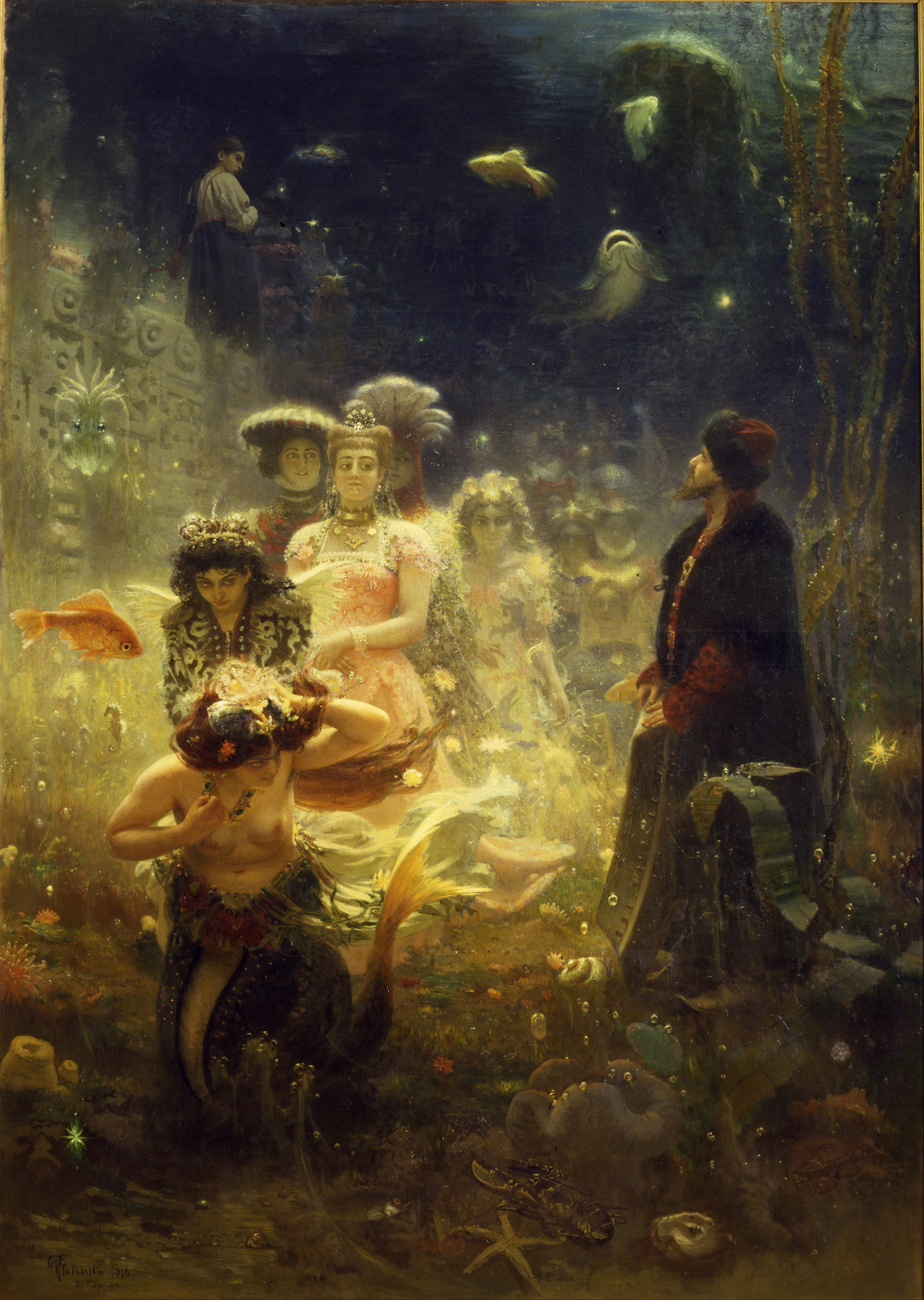
- Artist: Ilya Repin
- Year: 1876
- Medium: Oil on canvas
- Dimensions: 323 cm × 230 cm (127 in × 91 in)
- Location: Russian Museum; Saint Petersburg

Sadko, also known as Sadko in the Underwater Kingdom (Russian: Садко в Подводном царстве, romanized: Sadko v Podvodnom tsarstve), is an oil-on-canvas painting by Ilya Repin, made in 1876 during a visit to France. Based on a Russian epic poem, it depicts the merchant and musician Sadko who must choose one of the daughters of the Sea Tsar to marry.

Tsesarevich Alexander Alexandrovich, the future Tsar Alexander III, bought the painting which is in the collection of the Russian Museum in Saint Petersburg.

== Background ==
Ilya Repin studied painting at the Imperial Academy of Arts in Saint Petersburg and had an early success with Barge Haulers on the Volga (1870–1873). After this he decided to travel to Western Europe; not for his own sake, but because he thought Europe needed "fresh strength from the provinces". He reached Paris in October 1873, when he was 29 years old.

Repin was still in France when he painted Sadko in 1876, and the subject from Russian folklore appealed to him as a way to express his exile experience. The painting reflects Repin's impressions from the artistic and social life of Montmartre in Paris. He described the concept in a letter to the art critic Vladimir Stasov: "The naive and inexperienced Sadko is enchanted, but keeps his promise to the holy man to choose the girl who comes last, the Russian peasant girl. You can see that the idea is not the most original one, but it reflects my current state of mind, and maybe even the state of all Russian art, such as it is." Work on the painting went slowly and Repin began to lose interest in the subject when Alexey Bogolyubov convinced Tsesarevich Alexander Alexandrovich, the future Tsar Alexander III, to commission it, prompting Repin to finish the work.

== Subject and composition ==
The subject of Sadko is from a bylina—an oral epic poem—recorded in north-western Russia. The merchant and musician Sadko has been brought to the realm of the Sea Tsar to give a performance. After the Sea Tsar has danced to his music—causing a devastating storm in the process—Sadko is asked to choose one of the tsar's mermaid daughters to take as his wife. Following the advice of a saint, Sadko refuses three times three hundred daughters before accepting the last one, Chernavushka. Repin painted Sadko to the right, overlooking a procession of half-human, half-aquatic women who pass by; the rejected mermaids at the front look disappointed. Chernavushka appears behind everybody else and glances toward the man. The image composition is made with a worm's-eye view and a high horizon. The picture is painted in oil on canvas and has the dimensions 322.5 cm × 230 cm (127.0 in × 90.6 in).

== Reception and provenance ==
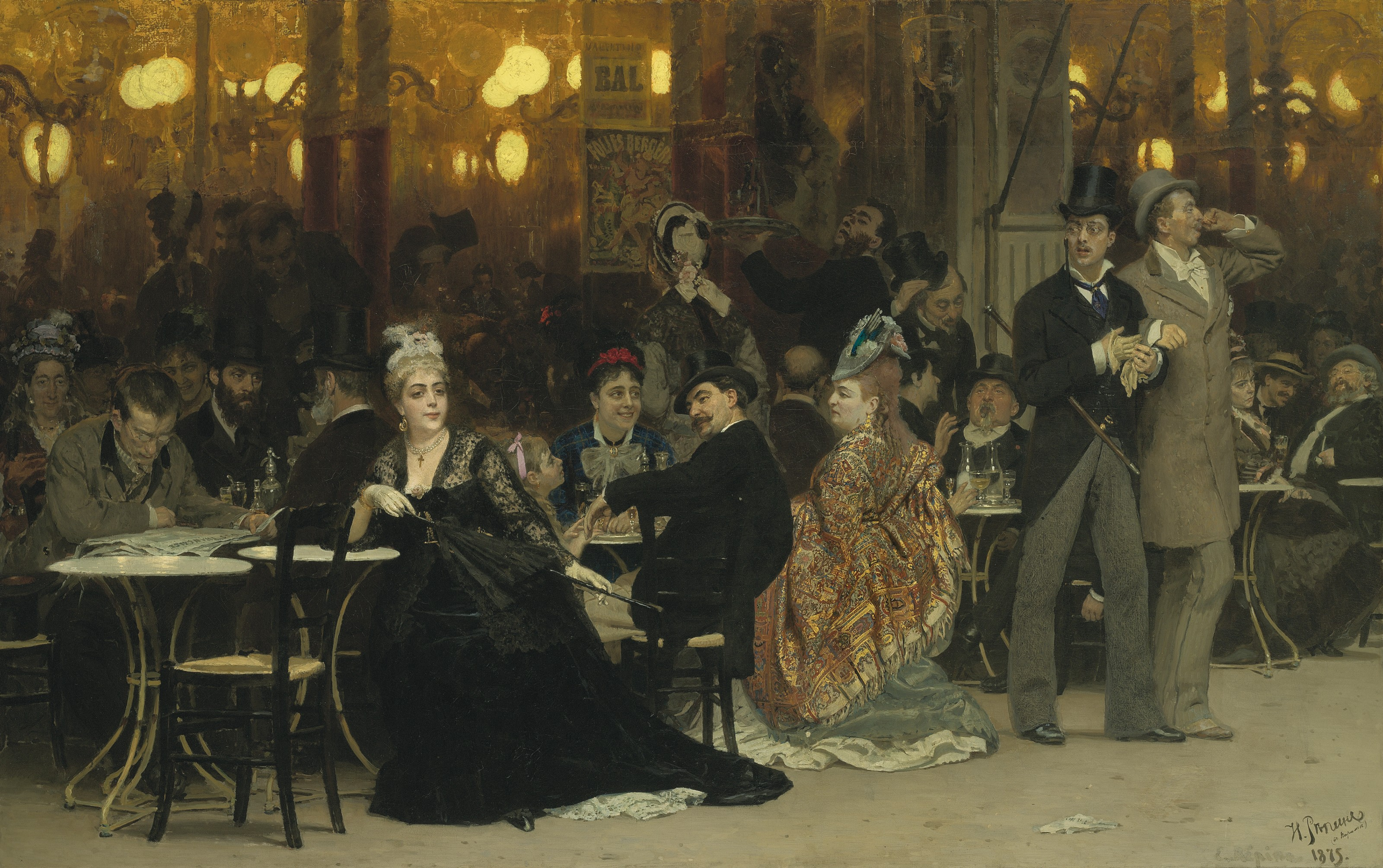
Sadko was exhibited with Repin's Paris Café.

Upon Repin's return to Russia, Sadko was exhibited by the Imperial Academy of Arts with two of Repin's other Paris paintings, Negro Woman and Paris Café. Sadko puzzled and polarised the politically inclined Russian critics. Conservative and Slavophile publications such as Russkiy Mir preferred it to the cosmopolitan Paris Café, but criticised what was described as an excess of technical prowess at the expense of narrative details from the source material. In the liberal newspaper Golos, Sadko was called a "tragic mistake". The critic said poetic and fantastical subjects did not suit Repin and lamented the direction the painter had taken after Barge Haulers on the Volga.

Sadko won Repin a membership in the Imperial Academy of Arts in 1876. It was kept at the Alexander Palace until 1897, when it entered the collection of the Russian Museum. It is on display at the Mikhailovsky Palace in Saint Petersburg.

== See also ==
- Sadko (film)
- Sadko (musical tableau)
- Sadko (opera)
