= Sadko (submarine) =

Submarine released in 1997

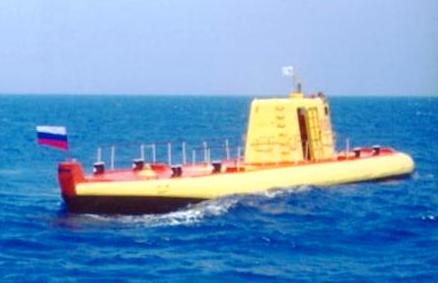
- Sadko pictured in 2007

History
- Ordered: Circa 1994
- Builder: Petrozavod, Saint Petersburg
- Laid down: Circa 1995–1996
- Launched: 26 June 1997

General characteristics
- Length: 30 m (98 ft)
- Propulsion: All-electric
- Speed: 3 knots (5.6 km/h; 3.5 mph)
- Endurance: 3 days submerged
- Test depth: 40 m (130 ft)
- Complement: 40 passengers
- Notes: Designed by Rubin Design Bureau

Sadko is a civilian submarine launched in 1997. She was designed by the Rubin Design Bureau, which had previously designed nuclear submarines for the Soviet and Russian navies. Capable of holding 40 passengers and diving to 40 metres (130 ft) depth Sadko is intended for use as a tourist excursion vessel. She operated initially in Saint Lucia but since 2001 has been based in Larnaca, Cyprus.

== Design ==
Sadko was designed by the Rubin Design Bureau, which had previously designed two-thirds of the Russian and Soviet Navy's nuclear submarines. Rubin had started to design civilian submarines, intended for use on tourist excursions, in 1988. Its first design Neptun was launched in 1991. Sadko was designed in 1994 as a development of the Neptun. The project was an example of military technology being turned to civilian use and the vessel was named after Sadko, a Slavic fairytale character who had adventures on the seafloor.

Sadko measures 30 metres (98 ft) in length, holds 40 passengers and has 22 portholes for underwater viewing. She is propelled by an all-electric drive and has no hydraulic systems, minimising the risk to the environment from fluid spills. She was designed to dive up to 40 metres (130 ft) underwater and can remain there for three days. Her speed is 3 knots (5.6 km/h; 3.5 mph). It was hoped that she would be leased for use by a tourism operator in the Caribbean, Mediterranean or Malaysia and Rubin had plans for further vessels of a similar design.

Sadko was built by Petrozavod in St Petersburg. Her construction was hampered by the period of hyperinflation and economic crisis of 1994–95 but was completed in 1997. Sadko was blessed by a Russian Orthodox priest in a ceremony on 19 June 1997 and was launched at 4 a.m. on 26 June. She was transported by road from the shipyard to the dock. With the water too shallow for her to be safely launched she was transported by barge to deeper waters.

== Service ==
Sadko operated firstly in Saint Lucia in the Caribbean but since 2001 has operated in Cyprus in the Mediterranean. Based out of Larnaca she is Russian-owned and operated, under the Larnaca Napa Sea Cruises brand. She makes trips that offer tourists views of marine life only normally visible to scuba divers. To attract fish to the vicinity the submarine is accompanied by a scuba diver who distributes chum as bait. This practice has been criticised for distorting the natural food chain. Sadko has also made trips to a number of shipwrecks in Cyprus such as HMS Cricket and the ferry Zenobia, as well as a sunken helicopter and armoured car.
