= Lilliburlero Variations for Two Pianos =

Musical composition for pianos, published in 1948

Three Fantastic Variations on Lilliburlero for Two Pianos is a composition by the British composer Madeleine Dring, published in 1948. Maurice Hinson describes it as being an octatonic work comprising three mildly contemporary, moderately difficult conventional variations in common time that rely too heavily on triplets. The composition takes as its theme Lilliburlero, a dance tune sometimes attributed to Henry Purcell, who published it in his Musick's Handmaid (1689).

David Nettle and Richard Markham have recorded the variations for Netmark (catalogue number NEMACD200, released 11 November 2003).
