= Sadko (film) =

1953 film by Aleksandr Ptushko

- Original Russian poster
- Directed by: Aleksandr Ptushko
- Written by: Konstantin Isayev
- Based on: Sadko by Nikolai Rimsky-Korsakov
- Starring: Sergei Stolyarov; Alla Larionova; Yelena Myshkova
- Cinematography: Fyodor Provorov
- Music by: Vissarion Shebalin
- Production company: Mosfilm
- Distributed by: Filmgroup (US)
- Release date: 5 January 1953
- Running time: 85 minutes
- Country: Soviet Union
- Language: Russian

Sadko (Russian: Садко) is a 1953 Soviet adventure fantasy film directed by Aleksandr Ptushko and adapted by Konstantin Isayev from Nikolai Rimsky-Korsakov's eponymous opera, which was based on a Russian bylina ('epic tale') about Sadko the merchant. The music is Rimsky-Korsakov's score.

The film was released in the Soviet Union by Mosfilm in January 1953. It was distributed in the USA by Artkino Pictures with English subtitles later in 1953, and in 1962 was English-dubbed by Roger Corman's The Filmgroup Inc. and distributed as The Magic Voyage of Sinbad.

== Plot summary ==
This tale is based upon the legends told of ancient times in the old Russian city of Novgorod (the capital of Novgorod Republic). Novgorod's merchants are feasting in a gorgeous palace. A young gusli player named Sadko is bragging that he can bring to their land a sweet-voiced bird of happiness. The merchants mock him for his bravado, and tell him his quest is impossible. Nevertheless, Sadko sets off on a travel to bring the bird of happiness to Novgorod. He is offered help by the daughter of the Sea Tsar; she is mesmerized by Sadko's singing and is in love with him. Sadko visits many lands in his search of the bird, including India, Egypt and other countries. Sadko is unable to capture the bird of happiness, and returns empty handed. But on his return to Novgorod, Sadko realizes that there is no better land than his homeland, and there is no need to go far in search of one's happiness.

== Cast ==
- Sergei Stolyarov as Sadko
- Alla Larionova as Lyubava
- Ninel Myshkova as Princess of Lake Ilmen
- Boris Surovtsev as Ivashka the Boy
- Mikhail Troyanovsky as Trifon
- Nadir Malishevsky as Vyshata the Giant
- Nikolay Kryuchkov as Omelyan Danilovich
- Ivan Pereverzev as Timofey Larionovich
- Yuri Leonidov as Kuzma Larionovich

== Awards ==
Sadko won the "Silver Lion" award at the Venice Film Festival in 1953; festival judges included lead actor Sergei Stolyarov in a list of the world’s best actors in the 50-year history of film.

== The Magic Voyage of Sinbad ==
Distributed by Artkino Pictures, Inc., Sadko was first shown in the U.S. in 1953 with English subtitles.

The film was re-released in the United States in 1962 in an English-dubbed and modified form by Roger Corman's Filmgroup under the title The Magic Voyage of Sinbad. It retains the plot structure of Sadko but includes several major changes:

- the total running time is reduced from approx. 85 to 79 minutes (most of the deleted footage consists of scenes in which songs are performed, though one song is retained and sung in English);
- voice-over narration is added;
- the protagonist Sadko is renamed "Sinbad";
- other characters and places are renamed to disguise the film's Russian origin;
- the film is transformed into a story about Sinbad the Sailor (e.g., the city of Novgorod is renamed "Copasand").

In fact, the opening narration makes direct reference to Ray Harryhausen’s 1958 hit film The 7th Voyage of Sinbad; namely, the battle with the Cyclops and the giant two-headed Roc bird—in an apparent attempt to cast this unrelated film as a direct sequel. Cast and credits were anglicized. The uncredited "Script Adaptor" for this version of the film was young Francis Ford Coppola.

This version of the film was featured in episode #505 of Mystery Science Theater 3000 (MST3K) in 1993, despite the fact that Kevin Murphy, voice of Tom Servo, has professed a love for the "breathtaking" visual style of this and other films by Aleksandr Ptushko in multiple interviews. Paul Chaplin, another writer of the show, has also expressed admiration, though he does not regret mocking it. The Magic Voyage of Sinbad is considered to be the second in the "MST3K Russo-Finnish troika".

== DVD release ==
The original Russian version of Sadko is available on DVD from RusCiCo. The heavily-modified, English-dubbed version The Magic Voyage of Sinbad is available on DVD from Retromedia in a double-feature with The Day The Earth Froze, the English-dubbed version of Ptushko’s later fantasy epic Sampo.

The Mystery Science Theater 3000 treatment of the film's English-dubbed version was released on DVD as part of the 20th four-film box set of the series through Shout! Factory on March 8, 2011. In some sets the DVD is mislabeled as the film Project Moonbase.

== See also ==
- Sadko, the Russian bylina (epic tale) upon which the film and opera are based
- Sadko (musical tableau), a symphonic poem by Nikolai Rimsky-Korsakov
- Sadko (opera), an opera by Rimsky-Korsakov
- Rimsky-Korsakov, a film (also from 1953) that presents fragments of the opera
