= Mistuning =

Action of incorrectly tuning or the state of being out of tune

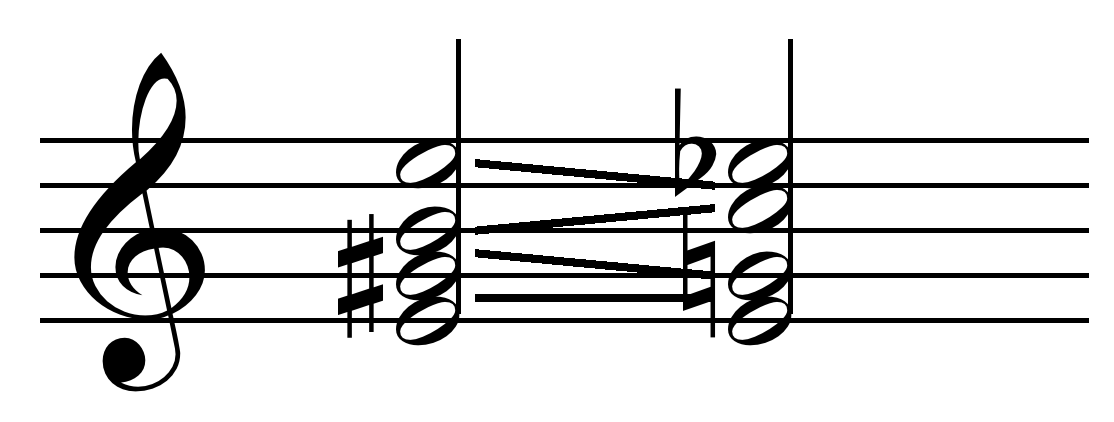
Alpha chord as mistuned major chord.

In music mistuning is most generally the action of incorrectly tuning or the state of being out of tune. Mistuning is also the displacement of a pitch a semitone away from its standard position in a stable tonal structure such as the most common perfect fourth or fifth, which mistuned in the opposite directions produce a tritone. A portion of the alpha chord:E-G-C-E♭, may be considered an E major chord: E-G♯-B-E, whose members are mistuned. (Wilson 1992, p. 9) See: alteration and chord substitution.

In mechanics mistuning is a lack of symmetry present in a real object that ideally is perfectly symmetric. This phenomenon is studied in relation to turbine disks, for example; it can cause an increase of the forced response that can bring about unexpected failures due to fatigue. Mistuning is caused by manufacturer tolerances, non-homogeneity of the material, the usage, etc., and so it is unavoidable. It has been observed that the amount of increase in the forced response of mistuned turbine disks strongly depends on the physical characteristics of the disk itself: actual efforts to limit the negative effects of this phenomenon upon turbine disks focus on understanding how to design a disk that is influenced minimally by mistuning in the working rotational speed.

== Sources ==
- Kárpáti, János (1975). Bartók's String Quartets. Translated by Fred MacNicol. Budapest: Corvina Press. Cited in Wilson (1992).
- Wilson, Paul (1992). The Music of Béla Bartók. ISBN 0-300-05111-5.
