= Richard Markham =

Richard Markham is an English classical pianist. Whilst still a student he was a prizewinner at the Geneva International Music Competition, and he made his London debut in 1974 appearing as soloist with the English Chamber Orchestra under Raymond Leppard at the Queen Elizabeth Hall.

He has performed at festivals such as Aldeburgh, Harrogate, City of London, Cheltenham, Bath, and York. He has appeared as soloist with orchestras including the London Symphony, London Philharmonic, Royal Philharmonic, Philharmonia, English Chamber, London Mozart Players, The Hallé, Royal Scottish, Ulster, and the BBC Philharmonic, Scottish and Concert Orchestras.

Markham has been performing as a piano duo with David Nettle since 1979. In 1987, they appeared in both the BBC Promenade Concerts and the Berlin Festival and in 1988 at the Schleswig-Holstein Festival. European tours have included the Dvořák Hall in Prague, the Philharmonie in Berlin, the Singer-Polignac Foundation in Paris and the Concertgebouw in Amsterdam.

Markham has appeared in three television documentaries. A frequent broadcaster on Classic FM and BBC Radios 2, 3, and 4, his recordings include Holst's own two-piano version of The Planets, which won the Music Retailers' Award for Best Chamber Music record in 1985, Nettle & Markham in America, Nettle & Markham in England (ranging from popular fare like the Warsaw Concerto to relative rarities like Madeleine Dring's Lilliburlero Variations for Two Pianos) and Nettle & Markham in France, The Complete Two-Piano Works of Brahms, Saint-Saëns’ Carnival of the Animals and Stravinsky's own piano duet version of The Rite of Spring and Petrushka.
