= Complexe sonore =

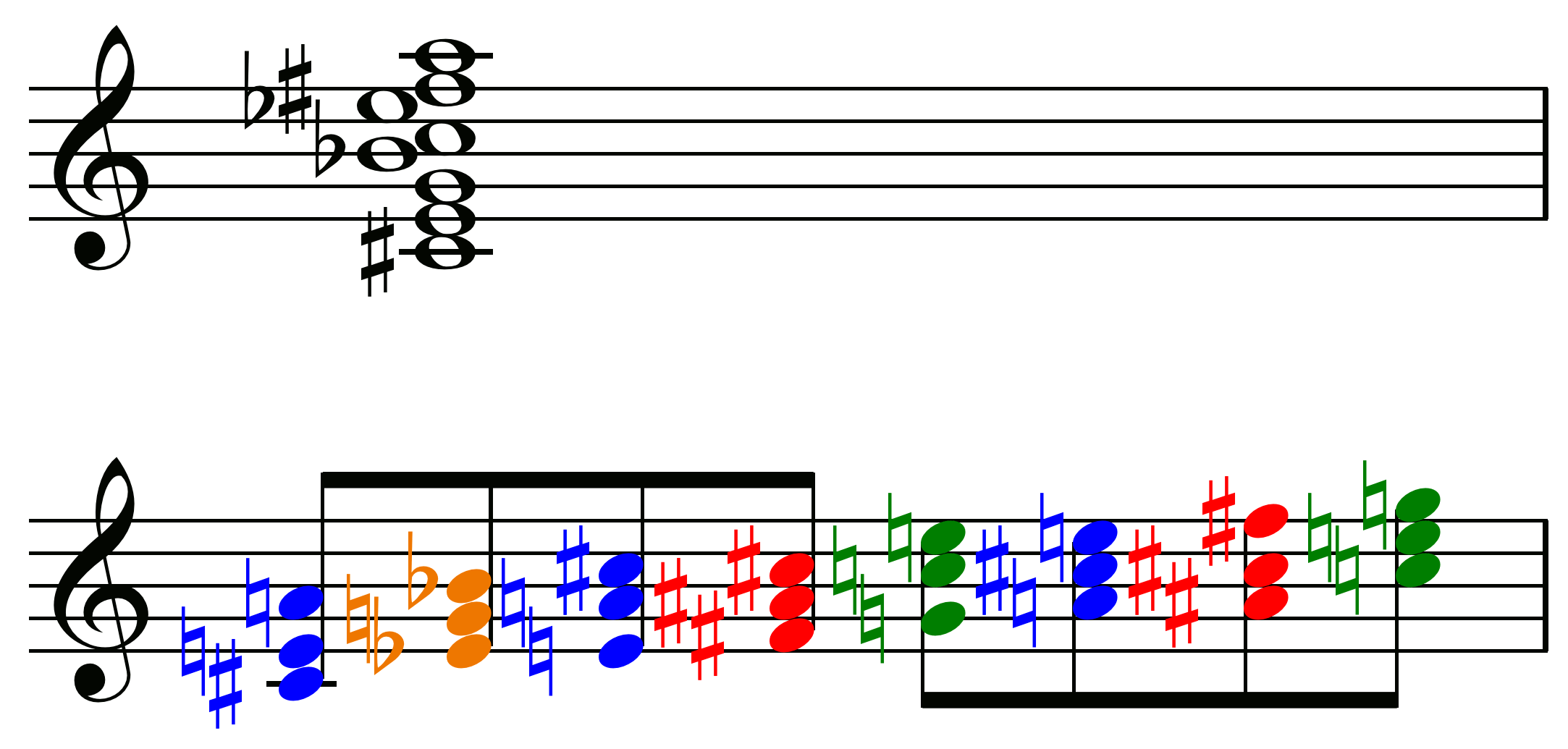
Complexe sonore: the octatonic scale may be arranged as four major chords or seventh chords.

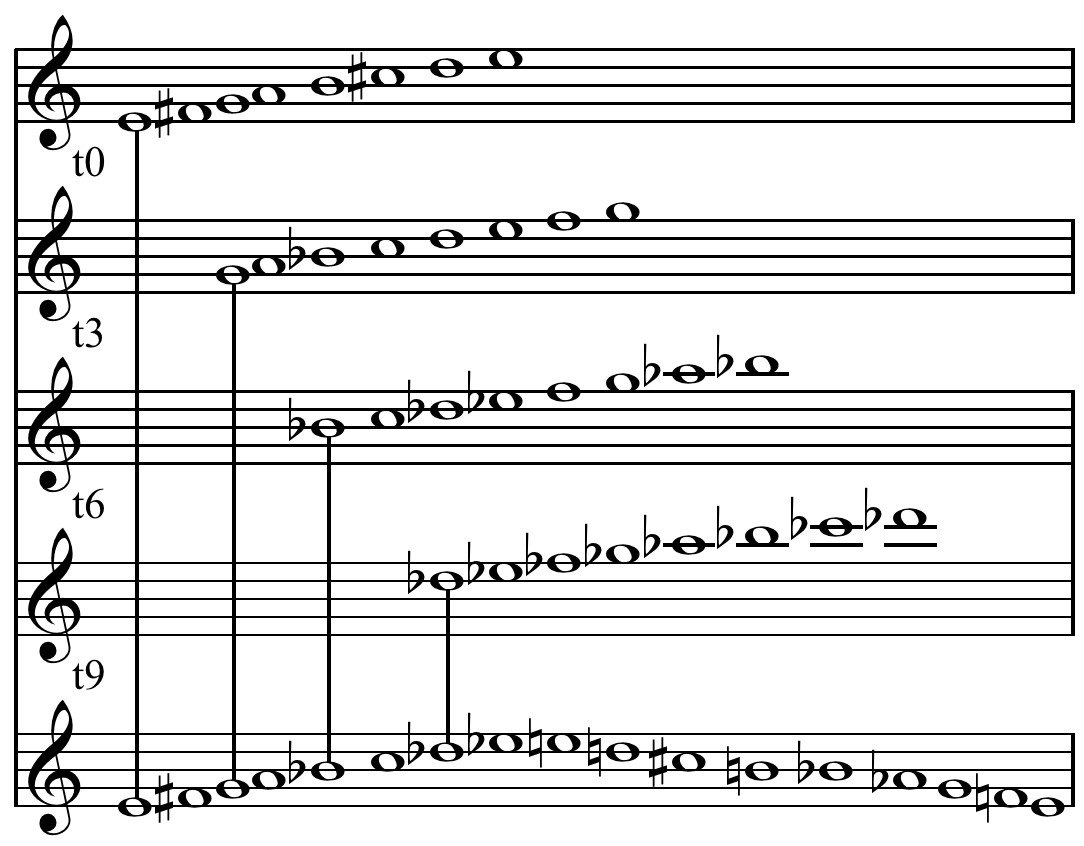
Octatonic scale on E (bottom), and symmetrical rotations by minor third (t3) of the Dorian mode on E, G, B♭, and D♭, (top three) from that scale.

The complexe sonore is an octatonic chord consisting of minor third relations.

More precisely, the complexe sonore is Igor Stravinsky's use of diatonic and whole tone motifs, and scales, against an octatonic background, rotated by minor thirds. Stravinsky "considered them to be in a perpetual state of potential symmetrical rotation by minor thirds under which the octatonic background scale is invariant." Dmitri Tymoczko argues that Stravinsky's octatonicism results "from two other compositional techniques: modal use of non-diatonic minor scales, and superimposition of elements belonging to different scales."

== See also ==
- French sixth chord
