= This Is Tommy Dorsey & His Orchestra, Vol. 1 =

Compilation album by Tommy Dorsey & His Orchestra
- Released: 1971
- Recorded: September 26, 1935 – November 14, 1944
- Genre: Jazz, swing, big band
- Length: 76:06
- Label: RCA

Professional ratings
Review scores
Source	Rating
Allmusic	4/5 stars

This Is Tommy Dorsey & His Orchestra, Vol. 1 is the first of two volumes originally released in a 1971 series by RCA Victor, which was created in response to a resurgence in big band recreations during the late '60s and early '70s, and is a reissue of 20 famous recordings by Tommy Dorsey & His Orchestra. The album was subsequently re-released in 2001 by Collectables Records.

== Narrative ==
These Dorsey sides, recorded between 1935 and 1944, unreel an era of chugging, big band togetherness; smooth-as-silk trombone mooing over brass punctuation and rising-and-falling reeds; tremulous, high-timbre, tenor voices undulating against rhythmic, glee club riffing; and the dancers Suzy-Q-ing or big-appling over to the raised bandstand to mill around, and sigh, and gawk...

The flashbacks fly: Tommy's remote broadcasts from Frank Dailey's Meadowbrook across the bridge in New Jersey...the electric, mink-and-tux openings at the Astor Roof near Times Square...the ear-catching, pied-piping of three men and a girl, Jo Stafford...Bunny Berigan's wonderful horn crackling jazzily behind a Dorsey solo...the date when Tommy fired the whole band, including vocalist Jack Leonard, for imbibing beer on the bandstand...manager Ralph Burns sashaying from Chicago's Palmer House over to the Sherman where a lean kid was singing with Harry James and inviting him for an audition to Tommy's hotel room...the bobby-soxers sighing and screaming and "swooning" over the lean kids vocals...

Truculent and sardonic offhorn, onstage Dorsey was the Sentimental Gentleman of Swing. He had the kind of consuming love affair with the sliphorn that drove him to rush off the bandstand at the Glen Island Casino in New Rochelle to drive down to midtown Manhattan, and after having played long hours for dancers only, trot into the 52nd St. Onyx, horn-in-hand for an into-the-sunrise session of jamming.

With his talented brother, saxophonist Jimmy Dorsey, Tommy came out of a coal town in Pennsylvania and gigging with the local Scranton Sirens, toured the country with Paul Whiteman, Red Nichols and other bands. By 1933 the brothers has a joint orchestra that included such future name leaders as Bob Crosby of Bobcat fame, drummer Ray McKinley and trombonist Glenn Miller. Two years later, after innumerable flare-ups Tommy walked off the bandstand at the Glen Island Casino to form his own band. I’m Getting’ Sentimental Over You, previously recorded with his brother, and the opening track of this album, became (with its accompanied opening trombone notes) his nostalgic identification.

Within a year, the Tommy Dorsey Band was at the top of the jazz trade paper polls. Into the 1940s, it remained one of the key aggregations of the Swing Era, despite the shifting personnel problems generated by World War II. Yearend of 1946 when Les Brown, Benny Carter, Benny Goodman, Woody Herman, Ina Ray Hutton, Harry James, and Jack Teagarden dissolved their bands, the Dorsey organization also became a postwar casualty.

But Tommy continued to fight the battle of the big bands, and in 1953, he made peace with Jimmy, and once again there was a Dorsey Brothers band. Tommy even made contact with the new teen generation through a television program, headlined by comic Jackie Gleason, in which he gave exposure to rock ‘n’ roll superstars. In the same year (1956), he died in his sleep at the age of 51, leaving the leadership of the reunited band to his brother. But Jimmy, who had cancer, outlived his brother by less than six months.

The present album offers a scintillating sampling of a recording career that spanned a quarter of a century. It contains virtually all the highlights – the discs that young people had to have in their collections in ’35 to ’44 to be “in.”

Marie: the Irving Berlin ballad in the swinging arrangement which was requested so frequently between ’37 and ’40 that it became a hangup with Tommy and vocalist Jack Leonard. To succeed the latter, Frankie Boy had to demonstrate that he could handle the vocal as deftly as Leonard had.

The Lady Is a Tramp: a Clambake Seven favorite that displayed Tommy’s uptempo, driving style, though his originality lay in the handling of slow ballads – creating moonlight moods without sacrificing danceability.

Song of India: played in the famous arrangement that featured Tommy’s far-off, silver-toned trombone. No one swung the classics with more sensitivity than Tommy, but he was once cut off the air by a Detroit station for swinging Loch Lomond.

== Track listing ==
Track	Song Title	Length
1.	I'm Getting Sentimental Over You; Composed by George Bassman, Ned Washington	3:35
2.	Stardust; Composed by Hoagy Carmichael, Mitchell Parish	3:32
3.	Marie; Composed by Irving Berlin	3:20
4.	Song of India; Composed by Nikolai Rimsky-Korsakov	3:06
5.	Once in a While; Composed by Michael Edwards, Bud Green	2:40
6.	Joesephine; Composed by Johnny Burke, Clifton Chenier, Wayne King	2:25
7.	The Lady Is a Tramp; Composed by Hart, Rodgers	2:53
8.	Who? Composed by Jeff Barry, Bobby Bloom, Oscar Hammerstein	3:05
9.	Music, Maestro, Please; Composed by Herbert Magidson, Allie Wrubel	2:55
10.	Boogie Woogie; Composed by Pinetop Smith	3:08
11.	Hawaiian War Chant; Composed by Prince Leleiohoku, Johnny Noble	3:08
12.	I'll Be Seeing You; Composed by Sammy Fain, Irving Kahal	3:02
13.	East of the Sun (And West of the Moon); Composed by Brooks Bowman	3:18
14.	I'll Never Smile Again; Composed by Ruth Lowe	3:10
15.	Whispering; Composed by Doris Fisher, Malvin Schonberger, John Schonberger	2:56
16.	Our Love Affair; Composed by Roger Edens, Arthur Freed	3:01
17.	Street of Dreams; Composed by Sam M. Lewis, Victor Young	2:39
18.	There Are Such Things; Composed by Stanley Adams, Abel Baer, George W. Meyer	2:40
19.	Opus One; Composed by Sy Oliver	2:56
20.	On the Sunny Side of the Street; Composed by Dorothy Fields, Jimmy McHugh	3:11

== 1971 track listing ==
Track	Song Title	Length
1.	I'm Getting Sentimental Over You; Sep 26, 1935, Composed by George Bassman, Ned Washington	3:34
2.	Star Dust; Apr 15, 1936, Composed by Hoagy Carmichael, Mitchell Parish	3:17
3.	Marie; Jan 29, 1937, Composed by Irving Berlin	3:17
4.	Song of India; Jan 29, 1937, Composed by Nikolai Rimsky-Korsakov	3:06
5.	Once in a While; Jul 21, 1937, Composed by Michael Edwards, Bud Green	2:39
6.	Joesephine; Sep 11, 1937, Composed by Johnny Burke, Clifton Chenier, Wayne King	2:23
7.	The Lady Is a Tramp; Sep 11, 1937, Composed by Hart, Rodgers	2:54
8.	Who? Oct 14, 1937, Composed by Jeff Barry, Bobby Bloom, Oscar Hammerstein	3:04
9.	Music, Maestro, Please; May 12, 1938, Composed by Herbert Magidson, Allie Wrubel	2:55
10.	Boogie Woogie; Sep 16, 1938, Composed by Pinetop Smith	3:08
11.	Hawaiian War Chant; Nov 29, 1938, Composed by Prince Leleiohoku, Johnny Noble	3:08
12.	I'll Be Seeing You; Feb 26, 1940, Composed by Sammy Fain, Irving Kahal	3:01
13.	East of the Sun (And West of the Moon); Apr 23, 1940, Composed by Brooks Bowman	3:20
14.	I'll Never Smile Again; May 23, 1940, Composed by Ruth Lowe	3:09
15.	Whispering; Jun 13, 1940, Composed by Doris Fisher, Malvin Schonberger, John Schonberger	2:58
16.	Our Love Affair; Aug 29, 1940, Composed by Roger Edens, Arthur Freed	3:00
17.	Street of Dreams; May 18, 1942, Composed by Sam M. Lewis, Victor Young	2:40
18.	There Are Such Things; Jul 1, 1942, Composed by Stanley Adams, Abel Baer, George W. Meyer	2:40
19.	Opus One; Nov 14, 1944, Composed by Sy Oliver	2:54
20.	On the Sunny Side of the Street; Nov 14, 1944, Composed by Dorothy Fields, Jimmy McHugh	3:12
