= Sadko =

Character in Russian folklore

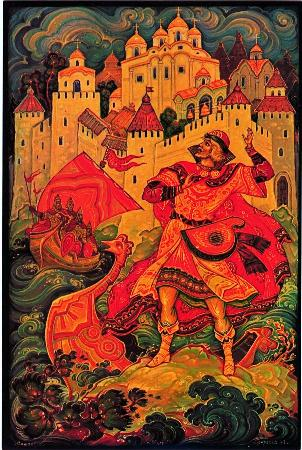
Sadko, Palekh miniature

Sadko (Russian: Садко) is a principal character in Russian byliny (oral epic poems). He is an adventurer, merchant, and gusli musician from Novgorod. The story of Sadko is best known outside Russia in the opera Sadko by Nikolai Rimsky-Korsakov.

== Textual notes ==
"Sadko" is a version of the tale translated by Arthur Ransome in Old Peter's Russian tales (1916). Kate Blakey's translation of a variant, "Sadko, the Rich Merchant Guest", appeared in the Slavonic Review (1924).

A bylina version collected by P. N. Rybnikov has been translated by James Bailey.

== Synopsis ==
Sadko of Novgorod played the gusli on the shores of a lake and river. (Note: Ilmen Lake, or Volkhov River.) The Sea Tsar (Note: Tsar Morskoy.) enjoyed his music, and offered to help him. Sadko was instructed to make a bet with the local merchants about catching a gold-finned fish in the lake; when he caught it (as provided by the Sea Tsar), the merchants had to pay the wager, making Sadko a rich merchant. (Note: The wager is wanting in Ransome's version, where Sadko is told by the Sea Tsar to draw the fish net and finds a coffer filled with gems.)

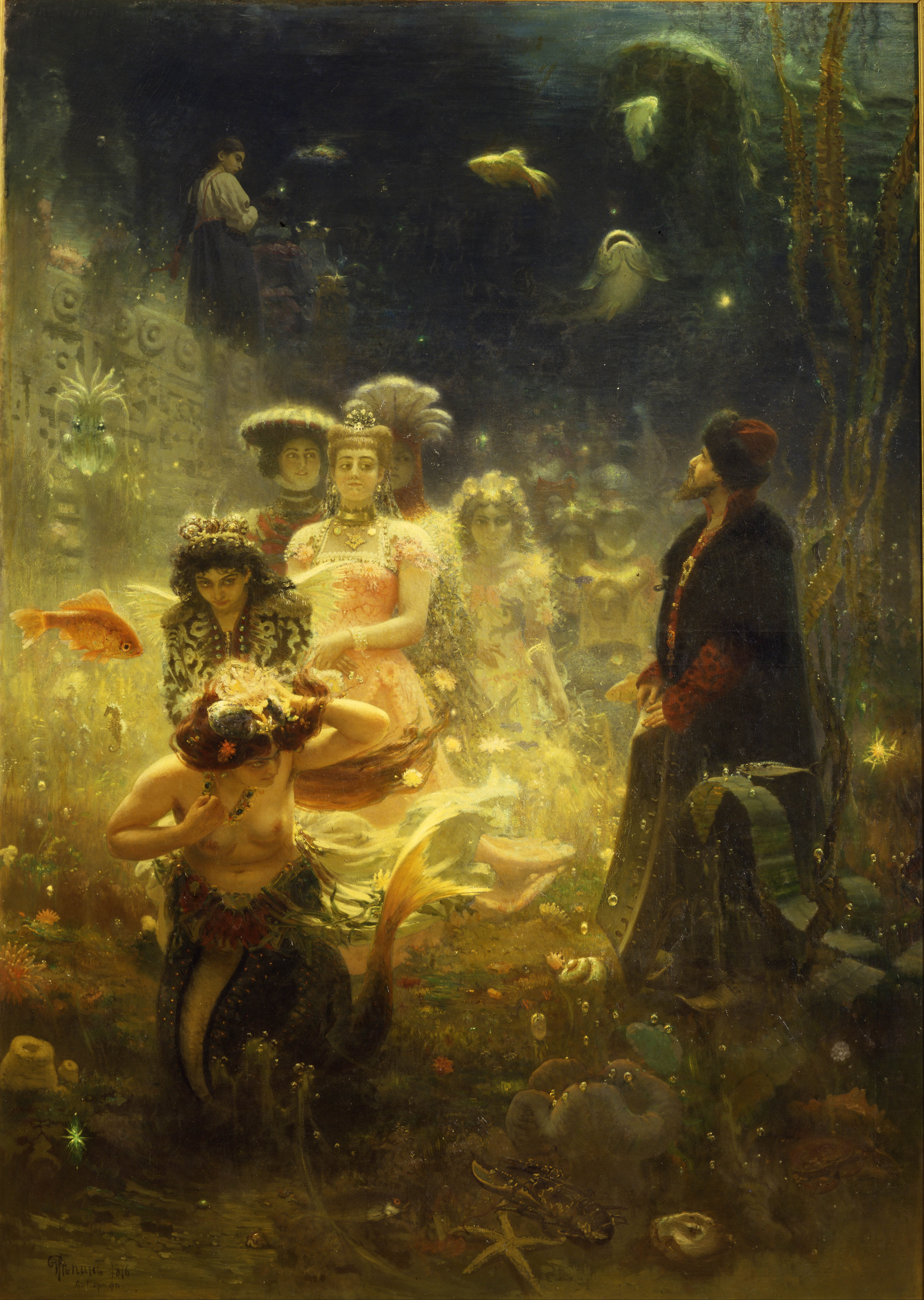
Sadko in the Underwater Tsardom by Ilya Repin.

Sadko traded on the seas with his new wealth, but did not pay proper respects to the Tsar as per their agreement. The Tsar stopped Sadko's ships in the sea. He and his sailors tried to appease the Sea Tsar with gold, to no avail. Sadko realizes a sacrifice of a live soul was being demanded. All the shipmates drew lots, but Sadko draws the unlucky lot as if by fate or magic, so he is sent overboard and he sinks into the sea.

In the sea world, Sadko played the gusli for the Sea Tsar, whose dancing roughened the seas, so that all the sailors prayed to Mikola Mozhaisky (Mikula Mozhaysk, patron of mariners; or the name Saint Nicholas is called by in variants), and the saint instructed Sadko to quit playing, and break the strings if the Tsar will not let him stop. As the Tsar was bound to offer him a choice of maidens to wed in order to detain him, Mikola advised him to choose the last one, with the warning not to embrace her as a wife (consummate the marriage), if he hoped ever to return to Russia. The Tsar showed Sadko a selection of 900 (or 300) maidens, and Sadko picked out Chernava (diminutive: Chernavushka) who appeared last. (Note: Picked from three sets of 300 mermaids; or three sets of 100 maidens. It is a choice from just 30 of the Tsar's daughters in Ransome's version.) The two then wed, but the groom made no overture to the bride on their wedding night, and Sadko the next day woke up in his hometown, reunited with his terrestrial wife.

The Chernava is explained as the nymph of the River Chernava. In Ransom's version, the Sea Tsar's youngest daughter is named Volkhov, which is the river Sadko has always cherished.

== Analysis ==
=== Tale type ===
The story of Sadko is classified in the international Aarne-Thompson-Uther Index as tale type ATU 677*, "Below the Sea": due to his musical prowess, the hero is taken to the court of an underwater Tsar.

=== Motifs ===
In some variants, Sadko is chosen to jump overboard by throwing lots between the men. This motif, derived from the Biblical story of Jonah, is a widespread device, appearing, for instance, in Child ballad 57 Brown Robyn's Confession.

== Historical parallels ==
Sadko may be based on a certain Sotko Sytinich (Сотко Сытиничь or Sodko Sytinets, Содко Сытинець), who is mentioned in the Novgorod First Chronicle as the patron of the Church of Boris and Gleb in the Novgorodian Detinets built in 1167 (not preserved).

== Adaptations ==
This tale attracted the attention of several authors in the 19th century with the rise of the Slavophile movement and served as a basis for a number of derived works, most notably the poem "Sadko" by Alexei Tolstoy (written 1871–1872); additionally notable the 1898 opera entitled Sadko composed by Nikolai Rimsky-Korsakov, who also wrote the libretto. In 1952, Aleksandr Ptushko directed a live action film based on the opera, also entitled Sadko. A shortened and heavily modified version of this film was dubbed and entitled The Magic Voyage of Sinbad in 1962; later spoofed on Mystery Science Theater 3000 and released on DVD by Shout! Factory in 2011. In 2018, an animated adaption was released.

The 1953 Soviet biopic Rimsky-Korsakov features pieces of the opera.

The 1952 original film adaption Sadko was released on DVD in February 2004 by the Russian Cinema Council (Ruscico), as noted on the Mosfilm website.

== See also ==
- Sadko (musical tableau)
- Sadko (opera)
- Jūratė and Kastytis - a similar Lithuanian legend.
