= Julian Cochran =

English-born Australian composer (born 1974)

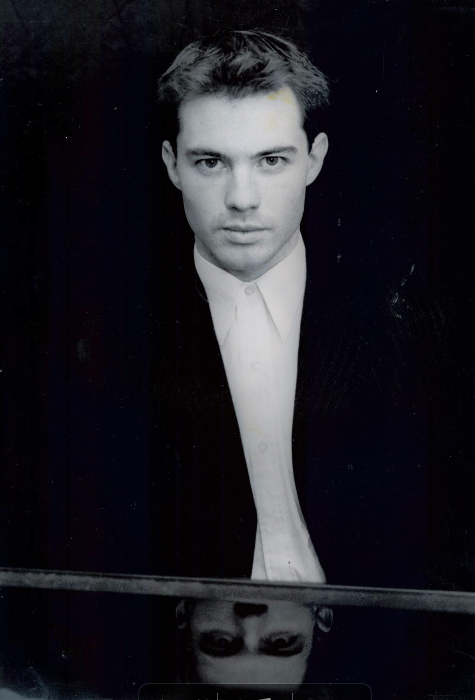
Julian Cochran in 1998

Julian Cochran (born 1974) is an English-born Australian composer.

Cochran's earlier works show stylistic influences from Impressionist music and his later works are more noticeably influenced by Classical music and folk music of Eastern Europe. The piano works include nineteen preludes, seven large Fantasia works (including Sarmatian Dances, Dagda's Harp, Scherzo da Fiaba, The Wind Sylph and the Dryad and the three movement work Sul Settimo), five mazurkas, two scherzi, six Romanian Dances, Animation Suite (comprising Tin Sentinel, Clockwork Doll, Wooden Dolls (Matreshki) and Flydian Galop), Animal Scenes (comprising Butterfly Dance, Hedgehog, Goat's Dance and Tail-chasing Kitten), Toccata & Fire Dance, the impressionistic work Maelstrom, three waltzes titled Valses, a cycle of five works titled Pegasus' Travels and Dances of Noble Sentiment (comprising Minuet, Courante, Rondeau and Forlana). Related to the piano works are seven pieces published for concert harp. Cochran also wrote orchestral and chamber music including the four-part work for soprano and piano Night Scenes, the trio for violin, cor anglais and concert harp or piano Artemis, the trio for violin, cello and piano Pegasus' Travels, the sextet for string quartet, oboe and bassoon Zorya Vechernyaya, Hendese for string quartet or string orchestra, the compilation of Fantasias Nos. 4, 5 & 6 titled Symphonic Tales for symphony orchestra, Two Valses for symphony orchestra, the Romanian Dances for chamber orchestra, the Romanian Dances for piano and violin, Dagda's Harp Fantasia for symphony orchestra and choral works.

Cochran's music has been performed at Carnegie Hall in New York, the Amsterdam Concertgebouw, the Berlin Konzerthaus, and the Saint Petersburg Philharmonic Hall in Russia. The International Cochran Piano Competition is held in Warsaw, Poland.
