= Sea Tsar =

Character in East Slavic folktales

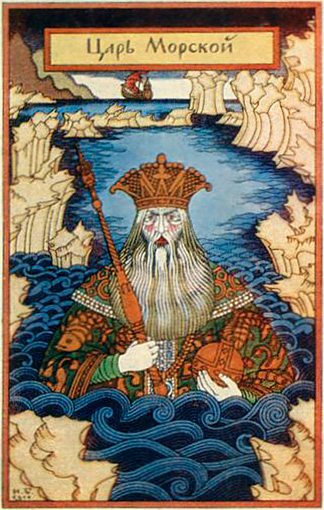
Sea Tsar by Ivan Bilibin, 1911

The Sea Tsar (Russian: Морской царь, sometimes inverted for emphasis: царь морской) is a character in East Slavic folktales and bylinas, the tsar of the sea realms. The best known examples are bylinas about Sadko and fairy tales about Vasilisa the Wise, such as The Sea Tsar and Vasilisa the Wise. Vsevolod Miller suggested that the image of the Sea Tsar was influenced by the Finnish god Ahti, known for the pomors (Russian seashore dwellers of the Russian North). Also Miller doubted that the image of Sea Tsar in these fairy tales reflects old East Slavic pagan beliefs and is probably based on the tales of itinerary storytellers. The Sea Tsar should not be confused with the water spirit, vodyanoy.

== The Sea Tsar and Sadko ==
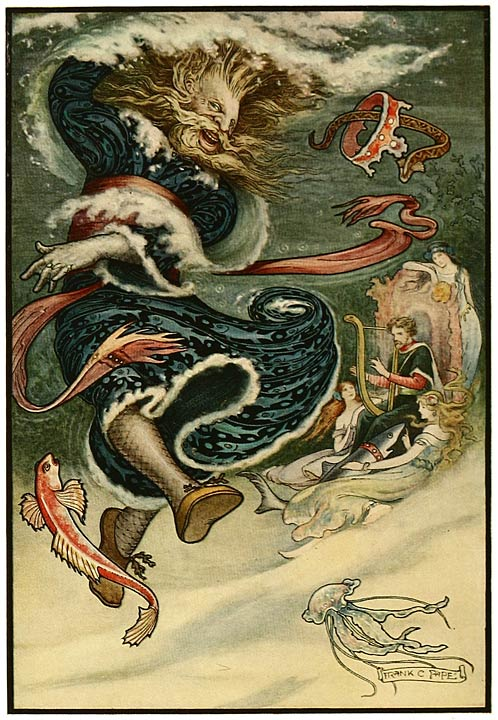
Sea Tsar dances to Sadko's music, Frank C. Papé, 1916

== The Sea Tsar and Vasilisa the Wise ==
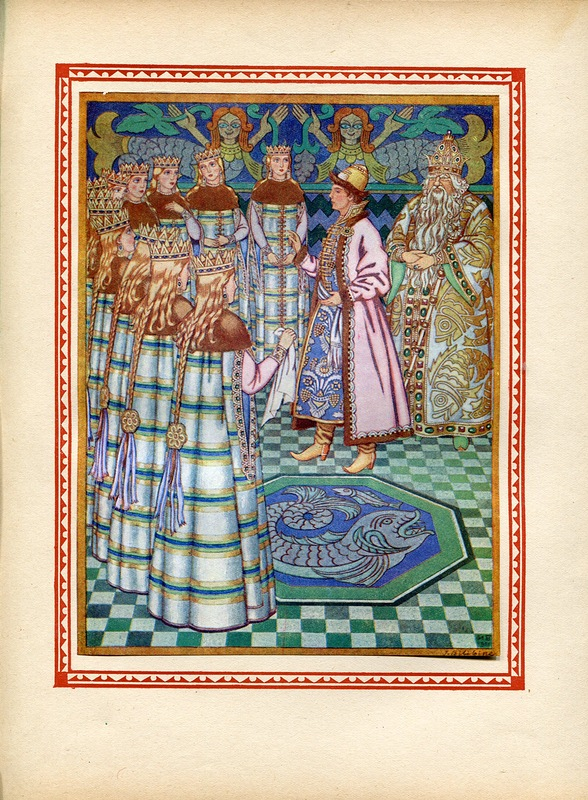
The Sea Tsar makes Ivan Tsarevich to guess Vasilisa among the twelve Tsar's twin daughters, Ivan Bilibin, 1931

== Sea kings of South Slavs ==
Some draw the parallel of the Sea Tsar with the tale about South Slavic morski kralj recorded, e.g., by Slovenian poet and ethnologist Matija Valjavec in his 1890 collection Narodne pripovjesti u Varaždinu i okolici (Folk Tales from Varaždin and its Vicinity), also published by Franc Hubad in his Pripovedke za mladino collection (referring to Valjavec). The tale in question (in both references) is called "Čudotvorni lokot" ("Magic Padlock").

Andrijana Kos-Lajtman and Jasna Horvat notice that in the tale "Magic Padlock" the sea king is not written with capital letters and there is nothing particular of sea surroundings, i.e., the sea is not a determining feature of the tale. It addition it turns out that the sea king also has a cat, clearly a non-maritime animal.

This is a story about a young man who rescues a dog, a cat, and a snake. Snake's mother gives him a magic padlock which fulfils his wishes. The padlock helps him to win the (land) king's daughter for a bride. A sea king comes to visit the (land) king, notices how the young man operates the padlock, steals it, and orders to bring the castle and the bride to the sea. The cat and the dog steal the padlock back, the young man wishes the castle and the bride back, and the sea king as well, whom they roast on a spit.

Another sea king (morski kralj) is in the elaborate literary fairy tale Ribar Palunko i njegova žena (Palunko the Fisherman and His Wife) by Croatian writer Ivana Brlić-Mažuranić. However her Sea King has nothing in common neither with that of Valjavec, nor with the Sea Tsar from the East Slavic folklore.
