= List of Soviet films of 1941 =

A list of films produced in the Soviet Union in 1941 (see 1941 in film).

== 1941 ==
Title	Original title	Director	Cast	Genre	Notes
1941
Anton Ivanovich Is Angry	Антон Иванович сердится	Aleksandr Ivanovsky	Nikolai Konovalov	Comedy	
The Artamonov Business	Дело Артамоновых	Grigori Roshal	Sergei Romodanov	Drama	
Dream	Мечта	Mikhail Romm	Yelena Kuzmina	Drama	
Four Hearts	Сердца четырёх	Konstantin Yudin	Valentina Serova	Comedy	
The Girl from Leningrad	Фронтовые подруги	Viktor Eisymont	Zoya Fyodorova	Adventure	
The Humpbacked Horse	Конёк-Горбунок	Aleksandr Rou	Pyotr Aleynikov	Fairy tale	
In the Rear of the Enemy	В тылу врага	Yevgeni Shneider	Nikolay Kryuchkov	Comedy	
Lad from Taiga	Парень из тайги	Ivan Pravov, Olga Preobrazhenskaya			
Masquerade	Маскарад	Sergey Gerasimov	Nikolay Mordvinov, Tamara Makarova	Drama	
Mysterious Island	Таинственный остров	Eduard Pentslin	Alexei Krasnopolsky	Science fiction	
Russian Soil	Русская земля			Documentary	At the 14th Academy Awards it was nominated for the Best Documentary Short.
Suvorov	Суворов	Vsevolod Pudovkin, Mikhail Doller	Nikolai Cherkasov-Sergeyev, Aleksandr Khanov, Mikhail Astangov	Biopic	
They Met in Moscow	Свинарка и пастух	Ivan Pyryev	Marina Ladynina, Vladimir Zeldin, Nikolai Kryuchkov	Musical	
Valery Chkalov	Валерий Чкалов	Mikhail Kalatozov	Vladimir Belokurov, Mikheil Gelovani	Biopic	

== See also ==
- 1941 in the Soviet Union
