= Ivan Lyubeznov =

Soviet Russian actor (1909–1988)

- Born: Ivan Aleksandrovich Lyubeznov; 2 May 1909; Astrakhan, Russian Empire
- Died: 5 March 1988 (aged 78); Moscow, RSFSR, Soviet Union
- Occupation: Actor
- Years active: 1928–1988

Ivan Aleksandrovich Lyubeznov (Russian: Ива́н Алекса́ндрович Любе́знов; 2 May 1909, Astrakhan – 5 March 1988, Moscow) was a Soviet and Russian stage and film actor. People's Artist of the USSR (1970).

== Personal life ==
Ivan Lyubeznov was born in Astrakhan.

He became a member of the Communist Party in 1940.

He married Marina Ladynina (1908–2003), an actress and a classmate. She studied under film director Ivan Pyryev.

He died in Moscow at the age of 78, and was buried in Vagankovo Cemetery.

== Filmography ==
- The Lonely White Sail (1937) – Man at the bulletin board
- The Rich Bride (1937) – Kovynko, accountant
- The Law of Life (1940) – Nikolai Zverev
- Yakov Sverdlov (1940) – Criminal
- Alexander Parkhomenko (1942) – Parliamentarian
- Six P.M. (1944) – Lieutenant Pavel Demidov
- Hello Moscow! (1945) – Ivan Aleksandrovich, vocational school director
- For Those Who Are at Sea (1947) – Lishev
- Encounter at the Elbe (1949) – Sergeant Harry Perebeynoga
- Hostile Whirlwinds (1953) – Lemekh
- Good Morning (1955) – Mikhail Mikhailovich Bobylyov, construction manager deputy
- The Idiot (1958) – General Ivolgin
- Sleepless Night (1960) – Sidor Afanasyevich Dubovik
- Animated Crocodile (1960–61) – Crocodile (voice; every episode except last)
- The Cossacks (1961) – Standard-bearer
- Colleagues (1962) – Yarchuk
- Soldiers of Freedom (1977) – Marshal Fyodor Tolbukhin
- Die Fledermaus (1979) – Frosch, duty jailer

== Awards and honors ==
- Order of the Badge of Honour (1938)
- Stalin Prize, 2nd class (1946) – for his portrayal of Pavel Demidov in Six P.M. (1944)
- Honored Artist of the RSFSR (1947)
- People's Artist of the RSFSR (1955)
- People's Artist of the USSR (1970)
- Order of the October Revolution (1974)
- Order of Lenin (1979)
- Jubilee Medal "Thirty Years of Victory in the Great Patriotic War 1941–1945"
- Jubilee Medal "Forty Years of Victory in the Great Patriotic War 1941–1945"
- Jubilee Medal "In Commemoration of the 100th Anniversary of the Birth of Vladimir Ilyich Lenin"
- Medal "For the Defence of Moscow"
- Medal "For Valiant Labour in the Great Patriotic War 1941–1945"
- Medal "In Commemoration of the 800th Anniversary of Moscow"
- Medal "Veteran of Labour"
