= Ballad of Siberia =

- Directed by: Ivan Pyryev
- Written by: Ivan Pyryev (story); Evgeniy Pomeshchikov; Nikolai Rozhkov
- Starring: Vladimir Druzhnikov; Marina Ladynina; Vladimir Zeldin; Vera Vasilyeva; Boris Andreyev
- Cinematography: Valentin Pavlov
- Edited by: Anna Kulganek
- Music by: Nikolai Kryukov
- Production company: Mosfilm
- Release date: 1948
- Running time: 114 minutes
- Country: Soviet Union
- Language: Russian

The Ballad of Siberia (in Russian: Сказание о земле Сибирской, romanized: Skazanie o zemle sibirskoy), also known as Symphony of Life, produced by Mosfilm and released in 1948, was the Soviet Union's second color film (after The Stone Flower). It was directed by Ivan Pyryev and starred Vladimir Druzhnikov and Marina Ladynina.

It is a Soviet style musical movie, full of songs, such as "The Wanderer", describing the development of Siberia after World War II.

== Synopsis ==
Pianist Andrei Balashov (Vladimir Druzhnikov) after being wounded at the front during the Great Patriotic War loses the opportunity to earnestly pursue music due to a hand injury. Without saying goodbye to his friends and his beloved Natasha (Marina Ladynina), he goes to Siberia. He works on the construction of a plant, and in the evenings sings in a teahouse. By chance, weather conditions force the plane with Andrey's friends, Boris Olenich (Vladimir Zeldin) and Natasha, who are flying to a competition abroad, to land at the airport near the building of the plant. Andrey meets them and it changes his life. He travels to the Arctic and inspired by the heroic labor of the builders to write a symphonic oratorio "Ballad of Siberia", which receives universal recognition.

== Cast ==
- Vladimir Druzhnikov as Andrei Nikolayevich Balashov
- Marina Ladynina as Natasha Pavlovna Malinina
- Boris Andreyev as Yakov Zakharonovich Burmak
- Vera Vasilyeva as Nastenka Petrovna Gusenkova
- Sergei Kalinin as Kornei Nefedovich Zavorin
- Yelena Savitskaya as Kapitolina Kondratyevna
- Vladimir Zeldin as Boris Olenich
- Mikhail Sidorkin as Sergei Tomakurov
- Grigoriy Shpigel as Grigori "Grisha" Galadya

== Songs ==
It is a musical movie, with songs both old and new. The most notable songs are:

- "The Song of the Siberian Earth" (words by Yevgeniy Dolmatovsky, music by Nikolai Kryukov)
- "The Hymn to Siberia" (words by Yevgeniy Dolmatovsky, music by Nikolai Kryukov)
- "The Wanderer" (in Russian: Бродяга)

== Influence ==
This film was so successful that a second color musical film, Cossacks of the Kuban, was made two years later by the same director and cast.

This movie also became popular in Japan. It gave influence to the Utagoe Movement and Utagoe coffeehouse in the 1950s, eventually leading to the Karaoke phenomenon in the 1970s.

== See also ==
- Cinema of the Soviet Union
- Cinema of Russia
- Utagoe coffeehouse
- Karaoke
