= Antosha Rybkin =

1942 Soviet film

- Russian: Антоша Рыбкин
- Directed by: Konstantin Yudin
- Written by: Aleksei Fajko; Anatoli Granberg
- Starring: Boris Chirkov; Marina Ladynina; Vladimir Gribkov; Lyudmila Shabalina; Konstantin Sorokin
- Cinematography: Boris Petrov
- Music by: Yuriy Milyutin; Oskar Sandler
- Production company: TsOKS
- Release date: 1942
- Running time: 48 minute
- Country: Soviet Union

Antosha Rybkin, (Russian: Антоша Рыбкин) is a 1942 Soviet war comedy film directed by Konstantin Yudin.

== Plot ==
The commander decides to hold a concert of the front brigade of artists in order to divert the attention of the enemy, who is about to attack the village. Chef Antosh Rybkin should play the role of a German corporal, get into the enemy's rear and release his native village from him.

== Cast ==
- Boris Chirkov as Antosha Rybkin (as B. Chirkov)
- Marina Ladynina as Larisa Semyonovna (as M. Ladynina)
- Vladimir Gribkov as Pal Palych Kozlovskiy (as V. Gribkov)
- Lyudmila Shabalina as Katya Vlasova (as L. Shebalina)
- Konstantin Sorokin as Fedya (as K. Sorokin)
- Nikolay Kryuchkov as Commander (as N. Kryuchkov)
- Tatyana Govorkova as Mariya Ivanovna (uncredited)
- Vera Krasovitskaya as Larisa Semyonovna (singing voice) (uncredited)
- Grigory Shpigel as Drunken machine gunner (uncredited)
- Evgeniy Teterin as German Soldier (uncredited)
