= Marina Ladynina =

Soviet film and theatre actress

- Марина Ладынина
- Born: 24 June 1908 [O.S. 11 June] Skotinino, Smolensk Governorate, Russian Empire
- Died: 10 March 2003 (aged 94); Moscow, Russia
- Resting place: Novodevichy Cemetery
- Occupation: Actress
- Years active: 1929–1965
- Spouse: Ivan Pyryev

Marina Alekseyevna Ladynina (Note: Russian: Марина Алексеевна Ладынина, romanized: Marina Alekseyevna Ladynina) (24 June 1908 [O.S. 11 June] – 10 March 2003) was a Soviet stage and film actress, best remembered for her leading roles in her husband Ivan Pyryev's films. People's Artist of the USSR (1950). Laureate of five Stalin Prizes.

== Biography ==
=== Early life ===
Marina Ladynina was born in Skotinino, Smolensk Governorate, the eldest of four children, and spent her early years in Nazarovo, near Achinsk in Yeniseysk Governorate, Siberia. Her parents, Aleksey Dmitriyevich Ladynin (1879-1955) and Maria Naumovna (1889-1971) were uneducated peasants; the family lived in a small wooden hut and young Marina had to do most of the hard work in the house. She spent summers as a hired worker at a local farm, milking cows.

As a schoolgirl, Marina was an avid reader; she joined the school theatre where her first role was Natasha in Pushkin’s "Rusalka", and regularly performed at the local street carnivals. In her teens Marina became a part-time actress at the Achinsk Drama theater. Upon graduation, aged sixteen, Ladynina went on to work as teacher in Nazarovo. She continued to perform in Achinsk and give musical performances there too, but was now determined to go to Moscow for further education. Her first port of call was Smolensk, where she met Sergey Fadeyev, the Meyerhold Theatre actor who advised her to go and take exams at the Russian Academy of Theatre Arts. By a happy coincidence the regional komsomol committee delegated Ladynina to Moscow to study social sciences. Instead she went straight to the Academy and gave an inspired performance before the jury which included celebrities like Serafima Birman and Vasily Luzhsky. She was instantly in, marked as "remarkably gifted" on the register list, which meant she was free from taking any further exams.

=== Career ===
In 1929, Ladynina debuted on screen, in a silent move Do Not Enter This Town. In her sophomore year she joined the Moscow Art Theatre part-time, where she debuted as the nun Taisia in Egor Bulychov and Others after Maxim Gorky, who personally expressed his delight. Then followed "In the World" (V Lyudyakh), another adaptation of the Gorky's text. In 1933 Ladynina played a blind flower girl in Prosperity, directed by Yuri Zhelyabuzhsky. That year she graduated from the Academy and joined the Moscow Art Theatre full-time.

Both of the MAT's directors, Konstantin Stanislavski and Vladimir Nemirovich-Danchenko, appreciated the newcomer's talent and gave her the part of Tanya in Maxim Gorky's In the World. Stanislavsky, writing to his sister, called Ladynina "the future of MAT". Ladynina remembered:

They really loved me in the theatre. Mikhail Yanshin, Ilya Sudakov, Alexey Gribov, Boris Livanov, Vasily Luzhsky all were frequent guests in our home... Luzhsky said he wanted to cast me in [Pushkin's] The Gypsies. When asked what was so gypsy-like in Ladynina, he answered: 'In her eyes there's this glint of freedom'. I became good friends with Vladimir Zeldin, Yury Olesha and Nikolay Cherkasov, a man of extraordinary kindness. We had very good relations with Mark Bernes and Faina Ranevskaya; the latter was our neighbor and often asked me to read her poetry, which she was a great lover of.

In 1934 the directors Ivan Pravov and Olga Preobrazhenskaya gave Ladynina the part of the teacher Linka in Enemy's Paths (Vrazhji tropy). It was there that she met both actor Ivan Lyubeznov, whom she soon married, and director Ivan Pyryev. Another film she starred in, The Post at the Devil's Ford (directed by Miron Bilinsky in 1936) was pronounced 'ideologically wrong' and shelved.

"Sure, you ought to be filmed, one has to do such things, for money and all that. Just do not forget that you belong to us, and never leave theatre for good," Nemirovich-Danchenko was telling her. In retrospect, she failed to heed this advice and later regretted it. There were objective reasons for this, though. At the height of the Big Purge many theatres got closed, actors rushed to MAT where Stanislavski has lost his influence and Ladynina was feeling less and less comfortable.

==== Career in film ====
In 1936 Ladynina who just signed with the newly formed Yuri Zavadsky's troupe, was summoned to the NKVD office to testify as a 'witness' against some of her former colleagues. Since none of the evidence she gave was found 'useful', the officer told her to forget about theatre and watch out for a case to be opened against herself soon. As both Zavadsky and Lyubeznov departed to Rostov-on-Don, Ladynina was left behind, unemployed and penniless. For several months, she worked as a cleaner and a housemaid to make her ends meet, then met the film director Ivan Pyryev again, in their friends' house. He proposed, and in 1936 they married.

This stormy marriage proved to be artistically fruitful. In 1937 Pyryev talked Ladynina into leaving the theatre and took her to Kyiv to shoot The Rich Bride. "Forget about Stanislavski and your ex-husband: from now on, only cinema matters. We'll work without any breaks," he was saying. The Rich Bride caused controversy. The bosses of the Ukrainfilm labeled the film 'nationalistic' and accused the authors of conspiring to make fun of the Ukrainian language. The Ukrainian film industry boss Boris Shumyatsky labeled the film 'damaging' and shelved it. Several months later Shumyatsky himself was arrested and executed as 'vreditel'. His follower Dukelsky, an NKVD man, sent the film to Moscow for affirmation. Stalin liked it immensely and the happy future of the Pyryev-Ladynina tandem was sealed. In 1938 Pyryev received an Order of Lenin for that film. Everybody seemed happy except for Nemirovich-Danchenko who, after seeing The Rich Bride, accused Pyryev of "corrupting a fine actress".

==== Stardom ====
Ladynina in Kremlin
For the first time I was invited to Kremlin in 1939, after the release of Tractor Drivers. Somebody approached me. 'It is your first time here with us!' the man said, we clicked glasses and he passed by, accompanied by two men with trays. Some people were around me and I asked, too loudly perhaps: 'Who was it?' - 'Hush, hush! Are you mad? This is Molotov!'" …"As for Stalin, I have never been introduced to him personally. I've read that he liked me. The feeling was not reciprocated. I hated him.
Marina Ladynina has never been the member of the Communist Party and kept her medals in a drawer, avoiding wearing them in public.

To cast his wife in Tractor Drivers (1939), Pyryev had to overcome the resistance of the chairman of the Soviet Cinema committee Dukelsky who did not want to see Ladynina as a tractor brigadier Maryana Bazhan. Pyryev won out. "Marina had to speed across the steppe on a motorcycle, ride a tractor... She was doing all this so professionally, as if that was what she used to do her whole life - driving tractors and competing in motor rallies," the director later marveled. The film (which also launched the career of the actor Boris Andreyev) made husband and wife famous. The Soviet press lauded Pyryev as "a father of the kolkhoz-based musical comedy," and Ladynina became the first superstar of this peculiar Soviet genre.

Pyryev, who on the day of his proposal promised his beloved one to never give her a day of rest, fulfilled his promise. Yet, when right after the Tractor Drivers she directly asked him: "Am I supposed to play kolkhoz women for the rest of my life?", he promised to think about it and soon handed her the script of Sweetheart, after Pavel Nilin's novelet. This melodrama with Ladynina as Varya Lugina, a Moscow industrial worker who leaves her jealous husband, was received coolly and Pyryev returned to what he knew how to do well.

In February 1941 Pyryev started to film They Met in Moscow, but the work had to be interrupted in June as the War broke out and most of the actors volunteered for the Red Army. Shot in the now empty Mosfilm studios, it came out in November 1941. Later critics dismissed it as a 'country lubok' (Note: Popular Soviet media term for something simple, flashy and 'too folky'.) but the audiences loved the romantic story of a Russian country girl from Vologda (Ladynina) and Musaib, a shepherd from the Caucasus, played by Vladimir Zeldin. This paean to the friendship of Soviet nations became highly relevant and extremely popular at the frontlines where people of different ethnic groups fought against the Nazis side by side.

Konstantin Yudin's comedy Antosha Rybkin and Pyryev's heroic drama The Raikom Secretary (both 1942) went almost unnoticed, but lyrical melodrama Six P.M. (1944) with Ladynina as Varya Pankova, a Moscow kindergarten teacher, proved immensely popular. Another hit, Ballad of Siberia (1947) ended up 3rd in the 1948 box-office rating. This musical comedy with Ladynina as singer Natasha Malinina pretended to raise serious ethical and moral questions but Sergei Eisenstein, for one, dismissed it as "Russian lubok imported from Czechoslovakia" (that was where the film had been shot).

External videos
- Cossacks of Kuban fragment on YouTube. Ladynina (as Galina Peresvetova) sings You've Never Changed, Isaak Dunayevsky's song, with Klara Luchko (and company) taking up at 2:22.

Cossacks of the Kuban (1949) saw Ladynina for the first time playing a mature woman, not some starry-eyed, naïve ingénue. The role of the Kolkhoz chairman Galina Peresvetova, a woman of tough character and tender heart, proved to be so difficult to handle that the actress for a time being was on the verge of quitting. Some argued that when it came to verve and charms, young Klara Luchko stole the show, but it was this hit that earned Ladynina the prestigious People's Artist of the USSR title. Ladynina, well aware that this 'masterpiece of Socialist realism' had nothing to do with the Soviet reality, still loved it. In one of her last interviews she claimed: "Even today I continue to receive letters from people expressing their gratitude, they are still under the spell of those comedy luboks… which, I am convinced, had every right to deviate as far from the cruel reality towards fairytale as one would wish them to. We really believed that we 'were born to turn a fairytale into the real thing' and we tried our best."

As her popularity grew, Ladynina started to get weary of the stereotype of a happy and resolute Soviet country girl she was now firmly associated with. Not a single director even thought of inviting her to play anything different: she was considered "a Pyryev actress". The one exception was Igor Savchenko who invited Ladynina to play a countess in Taras Shevtchenko (1951). She grabbed the opportunity, but all of her episodes turned out to be cut out by censors who loathed, apparently, the way her heroine sympathized with Taras instead of "hating him, as class enemy".

==== Later life and death ====
In 1954 the official directive came out forbidding Soviet film directors to cast their own wives. The part of Olga Kalmykova in Pyryev's Proof of Loyalty (1954) proved to be Ladynina's last. She divorced 58-year-old Pyryev (who fell in love with young actress Lyudmila Marchenko) and found herself in isolation: some directors received prompt orders from her ex-husband to ignore her, for others she was too much of a symbol of the Stalin's era. Not a single theatre wanted to have a recent superstar in their troupe. She joined the Cinema Actors Theatre but later was asked to leave so as to give way to more 'active' actresses. Ladynina tried to make it as a singer, having taken lessons from the well known tutor Dora Belyavskaya, but nothing came out of it. In 1965 Nikita Mikhalkov invited her to play a part in his Lermontov movie project which was never realised.

In her later years Ladynina rarely gave interviews and refused to talk about her life with Ivan Pyryev. In 1998 she received the Nika Award ("For Honesty and Dignity") and was greeted with standing ovation. Ladynina's one and only televised interview came out not long before her 95th birthday.

Marina Ladynina died of heart attack, on March 10, 2003. She is interred in Novodevichy Cemetery in Moscow.

== Private life ==
Maria Ladynina married her first husband, actor Ivan Lyubeznov, in 1935. Their union proved to be short-lived: the same year, while shooting The Enemy’s Path, she met 33-year-old film director Ivan Pyryev whom she married in 1936. Their one son Andrey Ladynin (1938-2011) later became film director. The pair divorced after it became known that 58-year old Pyryev was dating the 19-year-old actress Lyudmila Marchenko.

== Legacy ==
Maria Ladynina's career was short and her artistic credo limited. Still, she became one of the two superstar actresses of the Soviet cinema, along with Lyubov Orlova, according to film critic Valery Kichin. Five Stalin Prizes for five of her best known films (a feat unsurpassed in the Soviet cinema community) reflected to some extent the ideological value of her work and the appreciation by the authorities, but she was also dearly loved by the common people, in the Soviet countryside especially. So immense was Ladynina's popularity and so high was her status that for a while at the outset of the Moscow's Gorky street two huge portraits occupied the wall of a house, those of Ladynina and Stalin.

Unlike Lyubov Orlova (with whom her husband film director Grigori Aleksandrov was aiming at creating the alternative Hollywood on the Soviet soil), Marina Ladynina was a folklore-type actress to fit perfectly into the Pyryev-discovered genre of Soviet countryside musical comedy. "She symbolized happiness itself but nobody knew what kind of person she was in reality, in fact, nobody's ever wanted to know her, for in her last years she was tragically lonesome," according to Kichin.

Marina Ladynina who loved stage, spent the last half a century of her life out of it, waiting for this telephone call which never came. Unexpectedly, at 90, she received the Nika Award ("For Honour and Dignity") and the audience in the Cinema House greeted her with standing ovation. This was her last triumph after which there was silence again. "At the age of 95 Marina Ladynina died a 'rich bride' of the Soviet cinema: neither we nor she herself have had a chance to discover the true extent of her gift," Kichin concluded.

== Awards ==
- 1938 – Order of the Red Banner of Labour for The Rich Bride (1937)
- 1941 – Stalin Prize first degree – for the Maryana Bazhan role in Tractor Drivers (1939)
- 1942 – Stalin Prize second degree – for the role of Glasha Novikova in They Met in Moscow (1941)
- 1944 – Honored Artist of the RSFSR
- 1946 – Stalin Prize second degree – for the role of Varya Pankova in Six P.M. (1944)
- 1948 – Stalin Prize first degree – for the role of Natasha Malinina in Ballad of Siberia (1947)
- 1950 – People's Artist of the USSR
- 1951 – Stalin Prize second degree – for the role of Galina Ermolayevna Peresvetova in Cossacks of the Kuban (1949)
- 1983 – Order of Friendship of Peoples
- 1997 – Nika Award, For Honour and Dignity
- 1998 – Order of Honour, Lifetime achievement

== Selected filmography ==
- 1934 – Enemy's Paths (Vrazhji tropy). Linka, the school teacher
- 1937 – The Rich Bride (Bogataya nevesta). Marinka, Naum's granddaughter
- 1939 – Tractor Drivers (Traktoristy). Brigadier Maryana Bazhan
- 1940 – Sweetheart (Lyubimaya devushka). Varya Lugina, a Moscow industrial worker
- 1941 – They Met in Moscow (Svinarka y pastukh). Glasha Novikova
- 1942 – The Raikom Secretary (Sekretar raikoma). Natasha
- 1942 – Antosha Rybkin. Actress Larisa Semyonovna
- 1944 – Six P.M. (V shest chasov vetchera posle voiny). Varya Pankova, the kindergarten teacher
- 1947 – Ballad of Siberia (Skazaniye o zemle Sibirskoy). The singer Natasha Malinina
- 1949 – Cossacks of the Kuban (Kubanskiye kazaki). Galina Peresvetova, the kolkhoz director
- 1954 – Devotion (Ispytanie vernosti). Olga Kalmykova
