= Cinema of the Soviet Union =

The cinema of the Soviet Union includes films produced by the constituent republics of the Soviet Union reflecting elements of their pre-Soviet culture, language and history, albeit they were all regulated by the central government in Moscow. Most prolific in their republican films, after the Russian Soviet Federative Socialist Republic, were Armenia, Azerbaijan, Georgia, Ukraine, and, to a lesser degree, Lithuania, Belarus and Moldavia. At the same time, the nation's film industry, which was fully nationalized throughout most of the country's history, was guided by philosophies and laws promoted by the ruling Communist Party, particularly socialist realism.

== Historical outline ==
Upon the establishment of the Russian Soviet Federative Socialist Republic (RSFSR) on November 7, 1917 (although the Union of Soviet Socialist Republics did not officially come into existence until December 30, 1922), what had formerly been the Russian Empire began quickly to come under the domination of a Soviet reorganization of all its institutions. From the outset, the leaders of this new state held that film would be the most ideal propaganda tool for the Soviet Union because of its widespread popularity among the established citizenry of the new land. Vladimir Lenin viewed film as the most important medium for educating the masses in the ways, means and successes of communism. As a consequence Lenin issued the "Directives on the Film Business" on January 17, 1922, which instructed the People's Commissariat for Education to systemise the film business, registering and numbering all films shown in the Russian Soviet Federative Socialist Republic, extracting rent from all privately owned cinemas and subject them to censorship.

However, between World War I and the Russian Revolution, the Russian film industry and the infrastructure needed to support it (e.g., electrical power) had deteriorated to the point of unworkability. The majority of cinemas had been in the corridor between Moscow and Saint Petersburg, and most were out of commission. Additionally, many of the performers, producers, directors and other artists of pre-Soviet Russia had fled the country or were moving ahead of Red Army forces as they pushed further and further south into what remained of the Russian Empire. Furthermore, the new government did not have the funds to spare for an extensive reworking of the system of filmmaking. Thus, they initially opted for project approval and censorship guidelines while leaving what remained of the industry in private hands. As this amounted mostly to cinema houses, the first Soviet films consisted of recycled films of the Russian Empire and its imports, to the extent that these were not determined to be offensive to the new Soviet ideology. Ironically, the first new film released in Soviet Russia did not exactly fit this mold: this was Father Sergius, a religious film completed during the last weeks of the Russian Empire but not yet exhibited. It appeared on Soviet screens in 1918.

Beyond this, the government was principally able to fund only short, educational films, the most famous of which were the agitki – educational films intended to agitate, or energize and enthuse, the masses to participate fully in approved Soviet activities, and deal effectively with those who remained in opposition to the new order. These short (often one small reel) films were often simple visual aids and accompaniments to live lectures and speeches, and were carried from city to city, town to town, village to village (along with the lecturers) to educate the entire countryside, even reaching areas where film had not been previously seen.

Newsreels, as documentaries, were the other major form of earliest Soviet cinema. Dziga Vertov's newsreel series Kino-Pravda, the best known of these, ran for 23 issues from 1922 to 1925 and had a propagandistic bent; Vertov used the series for agitation and cinematic experimentation.

Still, in 1921, there was not one functioning cinema in Moscow until late in the year. Its rapid success, using old Russian and imported feature films, jumpstarted the industry significantly, especially insofar as the government did not heavily or directly regulate what was shown, and by 1923 an additional 89 cinemas had opened. Despite extremely high taxation of ticket sales and film rentals, there was an incentive for individuals to begin making feature film product again – there were places to show the films – albeit they now had to conform their subject matter to a Soviet world view. In this context, the directors and writers who were in support of the objectives of communism assumed quick dominance in the industry, as they were the ones who could most reliably and convincingly turn out films that would satisfy government censors.

Still from Grigory Chukhray's Ballad of a Soldier (1959)

New talent joined the experienced remainder, and an artistic community assembled with the goal of defining "Soviet film" as something distinct and better from the output of "decadent capitalism". The leaders of this community viewed it essential to this goal to be free to experiment with the entire nature of film, a position which would result in several well-known creative efforts but would also result in an unforeseen counter-reaction by the increasingly solidifying administrators of the government-controlled society.

In 1924 Nikolai Lebedev wrote a book on the history of film he says is "the first Soviet attempt at systematization of the meager available sources [on cinema] for the general reader". Along with other articles written by Lebedev and published by Pravda, Izvestia and Kino. In the book he draws attention to the funding challenges that follow nationalization of Soviet cinema. In 1925 all film organizations merged to form Sovkino. Under Sovkino the film industry was given a tax-free benefit and held a monopoly on all film-related exports and imports.

Sergei Eisenstein's Battleship Potemkin was released to wide acclaim in 1925; the film was heavily fictionalized and also propagandistic, giving the party line about the virtues of the proletariat. The kinokomitet or "Film Committee" established that same year published translations of important books about film theory by Béla Balázs, Rudolf Harms and Léon Moussinac.

One of the most popular films released in the 1930s was Circus. Immediately after the end of World War II, color movies such as The Stone Flower (1946), Ballad of Siberia (1947), and Cossacks of the Kuban (1949) were released. Other notable films from the 1940s include Alexander Nevsky and Ivan the Terrible.

The late 1950s and early 1960s marked changes in Soviet cinema. The period of de-Stalinization resulted in artists who had been purged being "rehabilitated" and their artistic credits being restored. This period marked a greater variety of topics depicted, decreasing censorship, and the development of more genre films in contrast to the socialist realism style prevalent under Stalin. The number of tickets sold was the primary way a film was deemed successful, but film professionals proposed considering other measures, such as financial success and relative popularity within less-popular genres. The Experimental Studio (ETK) opened in 1965 as an experiment in film production. The studio would rent sets as needed and would not have a permanent creative staff, but would instead employ artists by the project (in contrast to the overall Soviet film production system of the time). The studio would not receive artistic and efficiency bonuses as its method of payment, but would instead receive a percentage of the distribution of the film after it became profitable. This system was part of an increasing interest in developing individual artistic visions in film, along with the belief that different films would appeal to different subsets of the population rather than all films appealing to all moviegoers. This period produced Ballad of a Soldier, which won the 1961 BAFTA Award for Best Film, and The Cranes Are Flying.

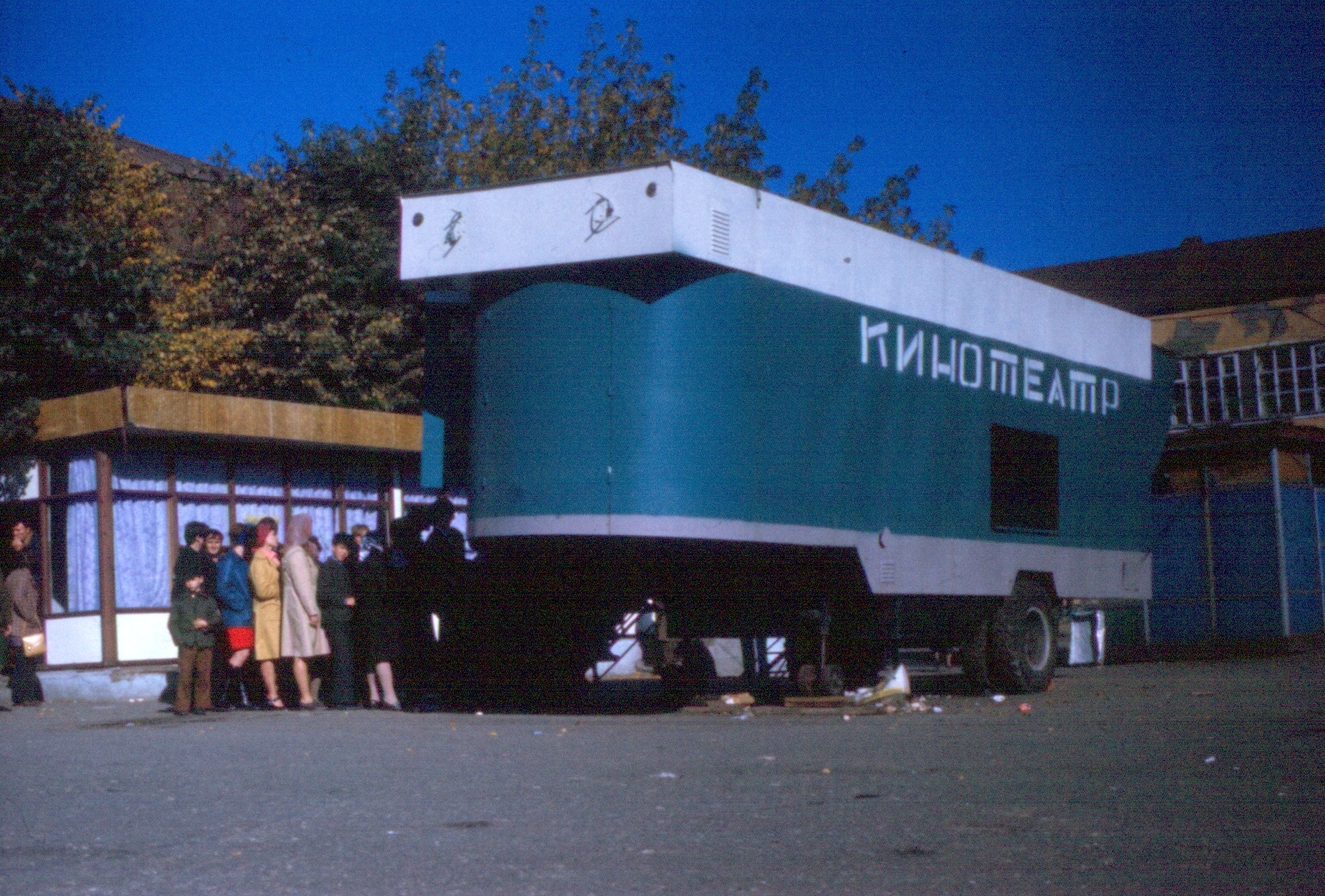
A movie theater in a trailer in Moscow, summer of 1976.

The number of films produced in the USSR increased during this period, from six fiction films in 1951 to 125 fiction films in 1965. New graduates from the Film Institute resulted in more new directors, with a goal set for 30% of new films in 1967 to be directed by new filmmakers. Approximately 100 foreign films were released in the USSR in 1965 and 1966. Between 1945 and 1965, 71 movie theaters were built in Moscow (there were 101 theaters total in the city), and 7 more were set to open in 1966. The total number of film-showing facilities in the USSR rose from 78,000 seats in 1959 to 145,300 in 1965, with 10,400 widescreen theaters and 87 "wide format" (70mm or Cinerama). Theaters were mostly concentrated in urban areas, such that annual film attendance rates in 1964 were 20.6 films for city-dwellers and only 15.7 films for country-dwellers. To address this disparity, an experimental filmobile program was devised and tested in Belarus. The filmobile was a bus outfitted with 35-60 seats and the ability to show a film. The bus drove in a radius of six to ten miles collecting audience-members until it was full, at which point it stopped, showed the film, and drove the attendees back to their villages. The efforts to increase film-going were successful, with theater attendances rising from 3,611,00,000 in 1960 to 4,112,000,000 in 1964. According to Soviet statisticians, the average theater visits per person per year in the USSR was 18.3 in 1964 versus 12 in the USA and 8 in England and France.

The Height is considered to be one of the best films of the 1950s (it also became the foundation of the bard movement).

In the 1980s there was a diversification of subject matter. Touchy issues could now be discussed openly. The results were films like Repentance, which dealt with repression in Georgia, and the allegorical science fiction movie Kin-dza-dza!.

== Censorship ==
After the death of Stalin, Soviet filmmakers were given a freer hand to film what they believed audiences wanted to see in their film's characters and stories. The industry remained a part of the government and any material that was found politically offensive or undesirable, was either removed, edited, reshot, or shelved. The definition of "socialist realism" was liberalized to allow development of more human characters, but communism still had to remain uncriticized in its fundamentals. Additionally, the degree of relative artistic liberality was changed from administration to administration.

Examples created by censorship include:

- Sergei Eisenstein's Ivan the Terrible Part II was completed in 1946 but was not released until 1958; 5 years after Stalin's death.
- Eisenstein's Alexander Nevsky was censored before the German invasion of the Soviet Union due to its depiction of a strong Russian leader defying an invading army of German Teutonic Knights. After the invasion, the film was released for propaganda purposes to considerable critical acclaim.

== Revolution and Civil War ==
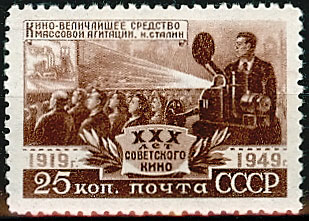
1950 postage stamp, marking 30 years of Soviet film. It quotes Stalin, who calls cinema "the greatest medium of mass agitation."

On August 27, 1919, Vladimir Lenin nationalized the film industry and created post-imperial Soviet films "when all control over film production and exhibition was ceded to the People’s Commissariat of Education." The work of the nationalized motion-picture studios was administered by the All-Russian Photography and Motion Picture Department, which was reorganized in 1923 into Goskino, which in 1926 became Sovkino. The world's first state-filmmaking school, the First State School of Cinematography, was established in Moscow in 1919.

During the Russian Civil War, agitation trains and ships visited soldiers, workers, and peasants. Lectures, reports, and political meetings were accompanied by newsreels about events at the various fronts.

== 1920s ==
In the 1920s, the documentary film group headed by Dziga Vertov blazed the trail from the conventional newsreel to the "image centered publicistic film", which became the basis of the Soviet film documentary. Typical of the 1920s were the topical news serial Kino-Pravda and the film Forward, Soviet! by Vertov, whose experiments and achievements in documentary films influenced the development of Russian and world cinematography. Other important films of the 1920s were Esfir Shub's historical-revolutionary films such as The Fall of the Romanov Dynasty which used montage editing techniques to repurpose old Imperial documentaries into a revolutionary theme. In 1924, filmmakers Sergei Eisenstein and Lev Kuleshov created the first association of Soviet filmmakers, the Association of Revolutionary Cinematography (ARK), to "meet the ideological and artistic needs of the proletariat". Although state controlled, "the organization was characterized by a pluralism of political and artistic views until the late 1920s". One of the most iconic developments in film during this period that is still used in films today was editing and montage to create meaning. This style of film making came to be known as the Kuleshov effect and was employed to conserve film stock due to shortages during that period. The film Hydropeat by Yuri Zhelyabuzhsky marked the beginning of popular science films. Feature-length agitation films in 1918–21 were important in the development of the film industry. Innovation in Russian filmmaking was expressed particularly in the work of Eisenstein. Battleship Potemkin was noteworthy for its innovative montage and metaphorical quality of its film language. It won world acclaim. Eisenstein developed concepts of the revolutionary epic in the film October. Also noteworthy was Vsevolod Pudovkin's adaptation of Maxim Gorky's Mother to the screen in 1926. Pudovkin developed themes of revolutionary history in the film The End of St. Petersburg (1927). Other noteworthy silent films were films dealing with contemporary life such as Boris Barnet's The House on Trubnaya. The films of Yakov Protazanov were devoted to the revolutionary struggle and the shaping of a new way of life, such as Don Diego and Pelagia (1928). Ukrainian director Alexander Dovzhenko was noteworthy for the historical-revolutionary epic Zvenigora, Arsenal and the poetic film Earth.

== 1930s ==
In the early 1930s, Russian filmmakers applied socialist realism to their work. Among the most outstanding films was Chapaev, a film about Russian revolutionaries and society during the Revolution and Civil War. Revolutionary history was developed in films such as Golden Mountains by Sergei Yutkevich, Outskirts by Boris Barnet, and the Maxim trilogy by Grigori Kozintsev and Leonid Trauberg: The Youth of Maxim, The Return of Maxim, and The Vyborg Side. Also notable were biographical films about Vladimir Lenin such as Mikhail Romm's Lenin in October and Lenin in 1918. The life of Russian society and everyday people were depicted in films such as Seven Brave Men and Komsomolsk by Sergei Gerasimov. The comedies of Grigori Aleksandrov such as Circus, Volga-Volga, and Tanya as well as The Rich Bride by Ivan Pyryev and By the Bluest of Seas by Boris Barnet focus on the psychology of the common person, enthusiasm for work and intolerance for remnants of the past. Many films focused on national heroes, including Alexander Nevsky by Sergei Eisenstein, Minin and Pozharsky by Vsevolod Pudovkin, and Bogdan Khmelnitsky by Igor Savchenko. There were adaptations of literary classics, particularly Mark Donskoy's trilogy of films about Maxim Gorky: The Childhood of Maxim Gorky, My Apprenticeship, and My Universities.

During the late 1920s and early 1930s the Stalin wing of the Communist Party consolidated its authority and set about transforming the Soviet Union on both the economic and cultural fronts. The economy moved from the market-based New Economic Policy (NEP) to a system of central planning. The new leadership declared a "cultural revolution" in which the party would exercise control over cultural affairs, including artistic expression. Cinema existed at the intersection of art and economics; so it was destined to be thoroughly reorganized in this episode of economic and cultural transformation.

To implement central planning in cinema, the new entity Soyuzkino was created in 1930. All the hitherto autonomous studios and distribution networks that had grown up under NEP's market would now be coordinated in their activities by this planning agency. Soyuzkino's authority also extended to the studios of the national republics such as VUFKU, which had enjoyed more independence during the 1920s. Soyuzkino consisted of an extended bureaucracy of economic planners and policy specialists who were charged to formulate annual production plans for the studios and then to monitor the distribution and exhibition of finished films.

With central planning came more centralized authority over creative decision making. Script development became a long, torturous process under this bureaucratic system, with various committees reviewing drafts and calling for cuts or revisions. In the 1930s censorship became more exacting with each passing year. Feature film projects would drag out for months or years and might be terminated at any point.

Alexander Dovzhenko drew from Ukrainian folk culture in such films as Earth (1930) along the way because of the capricious decision of one or another censoring committee. This redundant oversight slowed down production and inhibited creativity. Although central planning was supposed to increase the film industry's productivity, production levels declined steadily through the 1930s. The industry was releasing over one-hundred features annually at the end of the NEP period, but that figure fell to seventy by 1932 and to forty-five by 1934. It never again reached triple digits during the remainder of the Stalin era. Veteran directors experienced precipitous career declines under this system of control; whereas Eisenstein was able to make four features between 1924 and 1929, he completed only one film, Alexander Nevsky (1938) during the entire decade of the 1930s. His planned adaptation of the Ivan Turgenev story Bezhin Meadow (1935–37) was halted during production in 1937 and officially banned, one of many promising film projects that fell victim to an exacting censorship system.

Meanwhile, the USSR cut off its film contacts with the West. It stopped importing films after 1931 out of concern that foreign films exposed audiences to capitalist ideology. The industry also freed itself from dependency on foreign technologies. During its industrialization effort of the early 1930s, the USSR finally built an array of factories to supply the film industry with the nation's own technical resources.

To secure independence from the West, industry leaders mandated that the USSR develop its own sound technologies, rather than taking licenses on Western sound systems. Two Soviet scientists, Alexander Shorin in Leningrad (present-day St. Petersburg) and Pavel Tager in Moscow, conducted research through the late 1920s on complementary sound systems, which were ready for use by 1930. The implementation process, including the cost of refitting movie theaters, proved daunting, and the USSR did not complete the transition to sound until 1935. Nevertheless, several directors made innovative use of sound once the technology became available. In Enthusiasm: The Symphony of Donbass (1930), his documentary on coal mining and heavy industry, Dziga Vertov based his soundtrack on an elegantly orchestrated array of industrial noises. In The Deserter (1933) Pudovkin experimented with a form of "sound counterpoint" by exploiting tensions and ironic dissonances between sound elements and the image track. And in Alexander Nevsky, Eisenstein collaborated with the composer Sergei Prokofiev on an "operatic" film style that elegantly coordinated the musical score and the image track.

As Soviet cinema made the transition to sound and central planning in the early 1930s, it was also put under a mandate to adopt a uniform film style, commonly identified as "socialist realism". In 1932 the party leadership ordered the literary community to abandon the avant-garde practices of the 1920s and to embrace socialist realism, a literary style that, in practice, was actually close to 19th-century realism. The other arts, including cinema, were subsequently instructed to develop the aesthetic equivalent. For cinema, this meant adopting a film style that would be legible to a broad audience, thus avoiding a possible split between the avant-garde and mainstream cinema that was evident in the late 1920s. The director of Soyuzkino and, later, GUKF, Boris Shumyatsky (1886–1938), served as chief executive of the Soviet film industry from 1931 to 1938, and was a harsh critic of the montage aesthetic. He championed a "cinema for the millions", which would use clear, linear narration. Although American movies were no longer being imported in the 1930s, the Hollywood model of continuity editing was readily available, and it had a successful track record with Soviet movie audiences. Soviet socialist realism was built on this style, which assured tidy storytelling. Various other strictures were then added to the doctrine: positive heroes to act as role models for viewers; lessons in good citizenship for spectators to embrace; and support for reigning policy decisions of the Communist Party.

Such aesthetic policies, enforced by the rigorous censorship apparatus of the USSR, resulted in a number of formulaic films. Apparently, they did succeed in sustaining a true "cinema of the masses". The 1930s witnessed some stellar examples of popular cinema. The single most successful film of the decade, in terms of both official praise and genuine affection from the mass audience, was Chapaev (1934), directed by the Vasilyev brothers. Based on the life of a martyred Red Army commander, the film was touted as a model of socialist realism, in that Chapayev and his followers battled heroically for the revolutionary cause. The film also humanized the title character, giving him personal foibles, an ironic sense of humour, and a rough peasant charm. These qualities endeared him to the viewing public: spectators reported seeing the film multiple times during its first run in 1934, and Chapaev was periodically re-released for subsequent generations of audiences.

A genre that emerged in the 1930s to consistent popular acclaim was the musical comedy, and a master of that form was Grigori Aleksandrov (1903–1984). He effected a creative partnership with his wife, the brilliant comic actress and chanteuse Lyubov Orlova (1902–1975), in a series of crowd-pleasing musicals. Their pastoral comedy Volga-Volga (1938) was surpassed only by Chapaev in terms of box-office success. The fantasy element of their films, with lively musical numbers reviving the montage aesthetic, sometimes stretched the boundaries of socialist realism, but the genre could also allude to contemporary affairs. In Aleksandrov's 1940 musical Tanya, Orlova plays a humble servant girl who rises through the ranks of the Soviet industrial leadership after developing clever labour-saving work methods. Audiences could enjoy the film's comic turn on the Cinderella story while also learning about the value of efficiency in the workplace. Cinema also played a central role in the Sovietization of the Turkic peoples of Soviet Central Asia. Dedicated studios such as Uzbekfilm (1925), Vostokkino (1928) and Kazakhfilm (1934) produced films that reworked local historical figures and cultural motifs to convey Soviet policies on women's emancipation, anti-religious campaigns, collectivization and agricultural reform. Works such as Chadra (1927), Odna (1931), Amangeldi (1938) and Dursun (1940) embedded these messages in accessible, instructive narratives aimed at largely illiterate rural audiences.

== 1940s ==
Immediately after the end of the Second World War, color movies such as The Stone Flower (1946), Ballad of Siberia (1947), and Cossacks of the Kuban (1949) were released. Other notable films from the 1940s include the black and white films, Alexander Nevsky, Ivan the Terrible and Encounter at the Elbe.

The Soviet film industry suffered during the period after World War II. On top of dealing with the severe physical and monetary losses of the war, Stalin's regime tightened social control and censorship to manage the effects recent exposure to the West had on the people. The postwar period was marked by an end of almost all autonomy in the Soviet Union. The Catalogue of Soviet Films recorded remarkably low numbers of films being produced from 1945 to 1953, with as few as nine films produced in 1951 and a maximum of twenty-three produced in 1952. These numbers do not, however, include many of the works which are not generally considered to be "film" in an elitist sense, such as filmed versions of theatrical works and operas, feature-length event documentaries and travelogues, short films for children, and experimental stereoscopic films. But compared to the four hundred to five hundred films produced every year by Hollywood, the Soviet film industry was practically dead.

Even as the economy of the Soviet Union strengthened, film production continued to decrease. A resolution passed by the Council of Ministers in 1948 further crippled the film industry. The resolution criticized the work of the industry, saying that an emphasis placed on quantity over quality had ideologically weakened the films. Instead, the council insisted that every film produced must be a masterpiece for promoting communist ideas and the Soviet system. Often, Stalin had the ultimate decision on whether a newly produced film was appropriate for public viewing. In private screenings after meetings of the Politburo, the Minister of the Film Industry Ivan Bolshakov privately screened films for Stalin and top members of Soviet government. The strict limitations on content and complex, centralized process for approval drove many screenwriters away, and studios had much difficulty producing any of the quality films mandated by the 1948 resolution.

=== Trophy films ===
Movie theaters in the postwar period faced the problem of satisfying the growing appetites of Soviet audiences for films while dealing with the shortage of newly produced works from studios. In response, cinemas played the same films for months at a time, many of them the works of the late 1930s. Anything new drew millions of people to the box office, and many theaters screened foreign films to attract larger audiences. Most of these foreign films were "trophy films", two thousand films brought into the country by the Red Army after the occupation of Germany and Eastern Europe in World War II. In the top secret minutes for the CPSU Committee Meeting on August 31, 1948, the committee permitted the Minister of the Film Industry to release fifty of these films in the Soviet Union. Of these fifty, Bolshakov was only allowed to release twenty-four for screening to the general public, mainly films made in Germany, Austria, Italy, and France. The other twenty-six films, consisting almost entirely of American films, were only allowed to be shown in private screenings. The minutes also include a separate list of permitted German musical films, which were mainly German and Italian film adaptations of famous operas. Most of the trophy films were released in 1948–49, but somewhat strangely, compiled lists of the released films include ones not previously mentioned in the official minutes of the Central Committee.

The public release of these trophy films seems contradictory in the context of the 1940s Soviet Union. The Soviet government allowed the exhibition of foreign films which contained far more subversive ideas than any a Soviet director would have ever attempted putting in a film at a time when Soviet artists found themselves unemployed because of censorship laws. Historians hypothesize many possible reasons why the Soviet government showed such seemingly inexplicable leniency toward the foreign films. The government may have granted cinemas the right to show the films so they could stay in business after the domestic film industry had declined. A second hypothesis speculates that the government saw the films as an easy source of money to help rebuild the nation after the war. The minutes of the CPSU Central Committee meeting seem to support the latter idea with instructions that the films are to bring in a net income of at least 750 million roubles to the State coffers over the course of a year from public and private screenings, and 250 million roubles of this were supposed to come from rentals to the trade union camera network.

In addition to releasing the films, the committee also charged Bolshakov and the Agitation and Propaganda Department of the CPSU Central Committee "with making the necessary editorial corrections to the films and with providing an introductory text and carefully edited subtitles for each film." In general, the captured Nazi films were considered apolitical enough to be shown to the general populace. Still the Propaganda and Agitation Section of the Central Committee ran into trouble with the censoring of two films slated for release. The censors found it impossible to remove the "Zionist" ideas from Jud Suss, an anti-Semitic, Nazi propaganda film. The censors also had trouble with a film adaptation of Of Mice and Men because of the representation of the poor as a detriment to society.

There is very little direct evidence of how Soviet audiences received the trophy films. Soviet magazines or newspapers never reviewed the films, there were no audience surveys, and no records exist of how many people viewed the films. To judge the reception and popularity of these foreign films, historians have mainly relied on anecdotal evidence. The German musical comedy The Woman of My Dreams received mixed reviews according to this evidence. Kultura i zhizn published a supposed survey compiled of readers' letters to the editor in March 1947 which criticize the film for being idealess, low brow, and even harmful. Bulat Okudzhava wrote a contradicting viewpoint in Druzhba Narodov in 1986, saying that everyone in the city of Tbilisi was crazy about the film. According to him, everywhere he went people were talking about the film and whistling the songs. Of the two accounts, film historians generally consider Okudzhava's more reliable than the one presented by Kultura i zhizn. Films such as His Butler's Sister, The Thief of Bagdad, Waterloo Bridge and Sun Valley Serenade, although not technically trophies as they had been purchased legally during the wartime alliance with America, were highly popular with Soviet audiences. In Vechernyaya Moskva (October 4, 1946), M. Chistiakov reprimanded theaters and the Soviet film industry for the fact that over a six-month timespan, sixty of the films shown had been tasteless Western films rather than Soviet ones. Even in criticism of the films and the crusading efforts of the anti-cosmopolitan campaign against the trophy films, it is clear to see they had quite an impact on Soviet society.

== 1950s ==
Notable films include:

- The Cranes Are Flying, directed at Mosfilm by the Georgian-born director Mikhail Kalatozov in 1957. It won the Palme d'Or at the 1958 Cannes Film Festival.
- Ballad of a Soldier, directed at Mosfilm by Grigory Chukhray in 1959. It won 1960 Cannes Film Festival Special Jury Prize as well as 1961 BAFTA Award for Best Film from any Source along with many other awards. It was nominated for an Academy Award for Best Original Screenplay (1961).

== 1960s–70s ==
The 1960s and 1970s saw the creation of many films, many of which molded Soviet and post-Soviet culture. They include:

- Five Days, Five Nights (1960), the first of the joint Soviet-German films
- Walking the Streets of Moscow (1963)
- Operation Y and Shurik's Other Adventures (1965) and its sequel, Kidnapping, Caucasian Style (1966)
- War and Peace (1966–67) Sergei Bondarchuk's adaption of Tolstoy's novel, with a budget of 8.5 million roubles, a running time of seven hours, and using thousands of extras. It was the first Russian film to receive an Academy Award for Best Foreign Language Film.
- Andrei Rublev (1966) won various international awards, such as FIPRESCI.
- The Diamond Arm (1968) has contributed a lot of humorous quotes.
- The Color of Pomegranates (1969) had a limited release inside the Soviet Union and wasn't seen abroad until years later, but has received critical acclaim since.
- White Sun of the Desert (1970), a classic "Eastern", with old-fashioned stereotyping of central Asians. It is ritually watched by cosmonauts before launches, and has contributed many quotes to the Russian language such as 'The East is a delicate matter'. Its theme tune became a huge hit.
- Gentlemen of Fortune (1971) starring Yevgeny Leonov
- Solaris (1972)
- The Irony of Fate, or Enjoy Your Bath! (1975)
- Office Romance (1977)
- Stalker (1979)

Since films were publicly funded by Goskino, Soviet directors were not preoccupied with commercial pressures. This contributed to the creation of philosophical and poetic films. Scripts had to be approved by a Goskino committee before the director would receive funding, and the production could be greenlighted, but in most cases, this did not amount to brazen censorship. As such, the directors Andrei Tarkovsky, Sergei Parajanov and Nikita Mikhalkov became known for the 'poetic' quality of their films. In keeping with Russian culture, tragi-comedies were very popular. These decades were also prominent in the production of the Eastern or Red Western.

Animation was a respected genre, with many directors experimenting with animation techniques. Tale of Tales (1979) by Yuri Norstein was twice given the title of "Best Animated Film of All Eras and Nations" by animation professionals from around the world, in 1984 and 2002.

In the year of the 60th anniversary of the Soviet cinema (1979), on April 25, a decision of the Presidium of the Supreme Soviet of the USSR established a commemorative "Soviet Cinema Day". It was then celebrated in the USSR each year on August 27, the day on which Vladimir Lenin signed a decree to nationalise the country's cinematic and photographic industries.

== 1980s ==
The policies of perestroika and glasnost saw a loosening of the censorship of earlier eras. A genre known as chernukha (roughly "black stuff"), including films such as Little Vera, portrayed the harsher side of Soviet life. Notable films of this period include:

- Moscow Does Not Believe in Tears (1980) won an Academy Award for Best Foreign Language Film in 1981.
- The Pokrovsky Gate (1982), a made-for-television comedy starring Oleg Menshikov
- Repentance (1984), a Georgian film about a fictional dictator which was banned until 1987
- Come and See (1985), a widely acclaimed World War II drama
- Kin-dza-dza! (1986), allegorical science fiction
- The Cold Summer of 1953 (1987), about criminals being released from the gulags after Stalin's death
- Little Vera (1988), notable as one of the first Soviet films with sexually explicit scenes

== Genres ==
=== Drama ===
- Battleship Potemkin, a 1925 silent drama film directed by Sergei Eisenstein, and named the greatest film of all time at the Brussels World's Fair.
- Mother, a 1926 drama film directed by Vsevolod Pudovkin, and based on the 1906 novel Mother by Maxim Gorky.
- Earth, a 1930 silent film by Alexander Dovzhenko.
- Nine Days in One Year, a 1962 film by Mikhail Romm about nuclear particle physics, Soviet physicists and their relationship.
- The First Teacher, a 1966 drama film directed by Andrei Konchalovsky set in the Kirghiz Soviet Socialist Republic.
- The Story of Asya Klyachina, a 1966 drama film directed by Andrei Konchalovsky set in a kolkhoz.
- Anna Karenina, a 1967 drama film directed by Aleksandr Zarkhi, based on the novel of the same name by Leo Tolstoy.
- Uncle Vanya, a 1970 film adaptation of Anton Chekhov's play of the same title by Andrei Konchalovsky.
- Lăutarii, a 1972 romantic drama set in mid-nineteenth century Bessarabia by Emil Loteanu.
- A Lover's Romance, a 1974 musical drama directed by Andrei Konchalovsky.
- Gypsies Are Found Near Heaven, a 1975 romantic drama directed by Emil Loteanu and loosely based on the stories of Maxim Gorky.
- A Slave of Love, a 1976 romantic comedy-drama directed by Nikita Mikhalkov loosely inspired by the life of Vera Kholodnaya.
- An Unfinished Piece for Mechanical Piano, a 1977 adaptation of Anton Chekhov's play Platonov by Nikita Mikhalkov.
- A Hunting Accident, a 1978 romantic drama directed by Emil Loteanu based on Anton Chekhov's The Shooting Party.
- Anna Pavlova, a 1983 biographical drama by Emil Loteanu based on the life of the titular ballet dancer.
- A Cruel Romance, a 1984 adaptation of Alexander Ostrovsky's play Without a Dowry by Eldar Ryazanov.

=== Historical epic ===
- Alexander Nevsky, a 1938 historical drama film directed by Sergei Eisenstein.
- Ivan the Terrible, another historical drama film (in two parts) directed by Sergei Eisenstein in 1945.
- And Quiet Flows the Don (1957–58) by Sergei Gerasimov, an adaptation of the Nobel Prize winning novel And Quiet Flows the Don by Mikhail Sholokhov.
- Andrei Rublev, an epic historical drama made in 1966, loosely based on the life of the 15th-century Russian icon painter Andrei Rublev.
- War and Peace, a cinematic rendition of Tolstoy's novel made in 1966.
- Agony, a 1973 historical drama film about Grigori Rasputin directed by Elem Klimov.
- Siberiade, Andrei Konchalovsky's 1979 epic drama film in four parts, featuring Eduard Artemyev's famous soundtrack.

=== Comedy ===
- Carnival Night, of 1956, the first comedy film by Eldar Ryazanov, starring Igor Ilyinsky and Lyudmila Gurchenko; satire on a bureaucrat of the Stalin era.
- Walking the Streets of Moscow, a 1964 comedy film by Georgiy Daneliya, starring 18-year-old Nikita Mikhalkov.
- Beware of the Car, a 1966 crime comedy-drama film directed by Eldar Ryazanov.
- Kidnapping, Caucasian Style, a 1967 comedy by Leonid Gaidai. A lot of ethnic humor, as Shurik gets involved unwittingly in kidnapping. It's also a satire of corrupt local officials.
- The Diamond Arm, a 1969 comedy directed by Leonid Gaidai and starring Yuri Nikulin, Anatoli Papanov, and Andrei Mironov. Inept smugglers try to recover diamonds which ended up with the wrong man.
- Gentlemen of Fortune, a 1971 kindergarten principal played by Yevgeny Leonov pretends to be a criminal boss called the Professor (who looks exactly like him) to gain information about a stolen artifact from the Professor's two lackeys.
- The Twelve Chairs, a 1971 film by Leonid Gaidai based on the famous novel of the same name by Ilf and Petrov.
- Ivan Vasilievich: Back to the Future, a 1973 comedy by Leonid Gaidai. A scientist's time travel machine ends up teleporting his tenement administrator into 16th century Russia and bringing Ivan the Terrible into the present. The two are identical in appearance and chaos promptly ensues.
- The Twelve Chairs, a 1976 musical adaptation of the eponymous Ilf and Petrov novel by Mark Zakharov starring Andrei Mironov.
- The Irony of Fate, or Enjoy Your Bath!, a 1976 romantic comedy by Eldar Ryazanov. The picture is so beloved in Russia that it is broadcast on television every New Year Eve, similarly to the American movie It's a Wonderful Life being broadcast every Christmas.
- Office Romance, a 1977 romantic comedy directed by Eldar Ryazanov.
- D'Artagnan and Three Musketeers, a 1978 adventure television movie (Swashbuckler film), directed by Georgy Yungvald-Khilkevich. This film is based on the novel of the same name by Alexandre Dumas, père. The film stars a lot of the Soviet cinema actors and is now considered a classic. The film was such a huge success (thanks in large part to its numerous magnificent songs) that since the 1990s it has been broadcast on TV on New Year's Eve.
- The Very Same Munchhausen, a 1979 fantasy comedy by Mark Zakharov based on the Baron Munchausen stories.
- The Pokrovsky Gate, a 1982 comedy directed by Mikhail Kozakov and starring Oleg Menshikov as a young student who comes to Moscow and finds himself involved in the misfortunes of his fellow apartment tenants.

=== War films ===
- The Forty-First (1927), directed by Yakov Protazanov
- The Fall of Berlin, directed by Mikheil Chiaureli
- The Forty-First (1956), directed by Grigory Chukhray
- The Cranes Are Flying, a World War II drama, Palme d'Or winner
- Ballad of a Soldier, Grigory Chukhray's romantic war film, BAFTA winner
- Ivan's Childhood, the debut film of Andrei Tarkovsky. The Golden Lion of Venice Film Festival winner, based on the 1957 short story "Ivan" by Vladimir Bogomolov
- Liberation (in five films), a Soviet-Polish-East German-Italian-Yugoslav co-production directed by Yuri Ozerov
- The Dawns Here Are Quiet, based on Boris Vasilyev's novel of the same name
- Only "Old Men" Are Going Into Battle, a war musical film about Soviet World War II fighter pilots
- They Fought for Their Country, an epic war drama by Sergei Bondarchuk, starring Vasily Shukshin
- The Ascent, a 1977 war drama by Larisa Shepitko, starring Boris Plotnikov
- Battle of Moscow (in two films), a Soviet-East German-Czechoslovak-Vietnamese co-production directed by Yuri Ozerov
- Come and See, a war drama/psychological thriller film directed by Elem Klimov about the Nazi German occupation of Byelorussia
- Stalingrad (in two films), a Soviet-East German-Czechoslovak-American co-production directed by Yuri Ozerov

=== Red Westerns ===
- Miles of Fire by Samson Samsonov
- The Elusive Avengers by Edmond Keosayan.
- The New Adventures of the Elusive Avengers by Edmond Keosayan.
- White Sun of the Desert, one of the most popular Red Westerns (see Ostern).
- The Crown of the Russian Empire, or Once Again the Elusive Avengers by Edmond Keosayan.
- The Headless Horseman by Vladimir Vajnshtok.
- At Home Among Strangers, another Red Western film by Nikita Mikhalkov (his debut).
- Armed and Dangerous by Vladimir Vajnshtok.
- A Man from the Boulevard des Capucines by Alla Surikova.

=== Fantasy ===
- An Ordinary Miracle and its remake, a fairy-tale love story about a bear who has been transformed into a man by a wizard, and must be kissed by a princess to return to his original form.
- Jack Frost, Christmas tale by Aleksandr Rou.
- Ivan Vasilievich: Back to the Future, a comedy by Leonid Gaidai. A scientist's time travel machine ends up teleporting his tenement administrator into 16th century Russia and bringing Ivan the Terrible into the present. The two are identical in appearance and chaos promptly ensues.
- The Very Same Munchhausen, a comedy by Mark Zakharov based on the Baron Munchausen stories.

=== Science fiction ===
- Aelita, a 1924 silent film directed by Yakov Protazanov based on Aleksey Tolstoy's novel of the same name.
- Amphibian Man, a 1962 Soviet science fiction romance film based upon the eponymous novel by Alexander Belyaev
- Solaris and Stalker by Andrei Tarkovsky
- Kin-dza-dza!, a 1986 dystopian comedy/science fiction film by Georgiy Daneliya

=== Art house/experimental ===
- Man with a Movie Camera, an experimental 1929 silent documentary film by Dziga Vertov
- In Spring, an experimental 1929 silent documentary film by Mikhail Kaufman
- I Am Cuba, 1964 drama film directed by Mikhail Kalatozov.
- The Plea, a 1967 drama film directed by Tengiz Abuladze.
- The Color of Pomegranates, a 1969 drama film written and directed by Sergei Parajanov.
- Solaris, a 1972 science-fiction drama by Andrei Tarkovsky
- Mirror, a 1975 drama by Andrei Tarkovsky
- Stalker, a 1979 science-fiction drama by Andrei Tarkovsky
- Nostalghia, a 1983 drama film by Andrei Tarkovsky

=== Children's films ===
- Ilya Muromets, based on the byliny tales film by Aleksandr Ptushko.
- Jack Frost, Christmas tale by Aleksandr Rou.
- Moscow-Cassiopeia and Teens in the Universe, science fiction films by Richard Viktorov.
- The Adventures of Buratino, adaptation of The Adventures of Pinocchio, by Leonid Nechayev.
- The Mystery of the Third Planet, famous animated movie based on Alice: The Girl from Earth books by writer Kir Bulychov.
- Mio in the Land of Faraway, fantasy film directed by Vladimir Grammatikov.

=== Documentary ===
- Heroic Deed Among the Ice, a 1928 silent documentary film by Vasilyev brothers
- Man with a Movie Camera, an experimental 1929 silent documentary film by Dziga Vertov
- In Spring, an experimental 1929 silent documentary film by Mikhail Kaufman
- Anna: 6 - 18, an experimental documentary by Nikita Mikhalkov in which he filmed his daughter Anna during the period of thirteen years.

=== TV ===
- Seventeen Moments of Spring, a 1973 Soviet twelve-part television miniseries, based on the novel of the same title by Yulian Semyonov.
- The Meeting Place Cannot Be Changed, a 1979 miniseries set in 1945. Vladimir Vysotsky plays a no-nonsense cop trying to catch the deadly Black Cat gang.
- The Adventures of Sherlock Holmes and Dr. Watson, a series of television films directed by Igor Maslennikov.
- Heart of a Dog, a black-and-white 1988 television film based on Mikhail Bulgakov's novel Heart of a Dog.

== Notable filmmakers ==
Early personalities in the development of Soviet cinema:

- Mikheil Chiaureli
- Grigori Aleksandrov
- Sergei Bondarchuk
- Alexander Dovzhenko
- Sergei Eisenstein
- Grigori Kozintsev
- Lev Kuleshov
- Yakov Protazanov
- Vsevolod Pudovkin
- Ivan Pyryev
- Boris Shumyatsky
- Leonid Trauberg
- Aleksandr Medvedkin
- Dziga Vertov

Later personalities:

- Tengiz Abuladze
- Andrei Konchalovsky
- Nikita Mikhalkov
- Alexander Sokurov
- Andrei Tarkovsky
- Aleksei German
- Elem Klimov
- Shaken Aimanov
- Larisa Shepitko
- Eldar Ryazanov
- Leonid Gaidai
- Georgiy Daneliya
- Kira Muratova
- Sergei Parajanov

== Soviet production units ==
- Armenfilm
- Azerbaijanfilm
- Belarusfilm
- Tallinnfilm
- Gruziya-Film
- Kazakhfilm
- Kyrgyzfilm
- Riga Film Studio
- Lithuanian Film Studio
- Moldova-Film
- Central Studio for Documentary Film
- Gorky Film Studio
- Lenfilm
- Lennauchfilm
- Mosfilm
- Pilot
- South-Siberian Film Studio
- Soyuzmultfilm
- Studio Ekran
- Sverdlovsk Film Studio
- Dovzhenko Film Studios
- Halychyna-Film Studio
- Kievnauchfilm
- National Cinematheque of Ukraine
- Odessa Film Studio
- Ukranimafilm
- Ukrtelefilm
- Yalta Film Studio
- Tadjikfilm
- Turkmenfilm
- Uzbekfilm

== See also ==
- Nika Award – the main national film award in Russia
- List of cinema of the world
- Cinema of Armenia
- Cinema of Azerbaijan
- Cinema of Belarus
- Cinema of Russia
- Cinema of Ukraine
- Lists of Soviet films
  - List of highest-grossing films in the Soviet Union
- History of Russian animation
- History of film
- World cinema
