= Animated Crocodile =

Animated Crocodile (Russian: Мультипликационный Крокодил, romanized: Multiplikatsionniy Krokodil), abbreviated as MuK, was a Soviet satirical animated series for adults. It was produced by Soyuzmultfilm and directed by various people. Between 1960 and 1961, six issues were released (three per year). Each episode consisted of several short, unrelated stories, except the fourth episode, Out into the Open, which had a single plot devoted to the topic of water pollution. Multiplikatsionniy Krokodil was popular with the audience.

The protagonist of the series was the Red Crocodile (Russian: Красный Крокодил), the mascot of the Soviet satirical magazine Krokodil. He was voiced by Ivan Lyubeznov in the first episodes and then by Lev Lyubetsky. The voice cast also included Georgy Vitsin, Sergey Martinson, Anatoli Papanov, Lev Potyomkin and others, as well as starting Soviet leader Nikita Khrushchev.

== See also ==
- Fitil
