= Tractor Drivers =

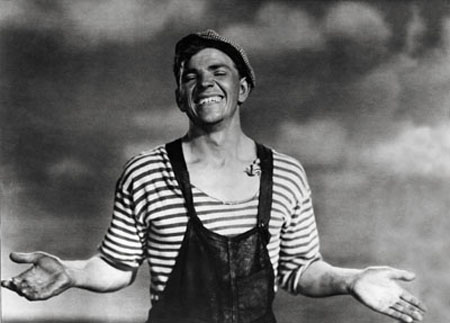
- Russian: Трактористы
- Directed by: Ivan Pyryev
- Written by: Yevgeny Pomeshchikov
- Produced by: Viktor Biyazi
- Starring: Marina Ladynina; Nikolay Kryuchkov; Boris Andreyev
- Cinematography: Aleksandr Galperin
- Edited by: Anna Kulganek
- Music by: Daniil Pokras; Dmitri Pokras
- Production company: Mosfilm
- Release date: 3 July 1939
- Running time: 88 minutes
- Country: Soviet Union
- Language: Russian

Tractor Drivers (Russian: Трактористы, romanized: Traktoristy) is a 1939 Soviet romantic comedy drama film directed by Ivan Pyryev.

The film tells the story of a resourceful sergeant who returns home to find love and purpose leading a spirited tractor brigade, while navigating rivalries, innovation, and the looming threat of war.

== Plot ==
The year is 1938. Demobilized sergeant Klim Yarko returns from the Far East, bringing with him a copy of the newspaper Pravda featuring a photograph of his fellow villager Maryana Bazhan, a brigade leader of a women’s tractor team and a recipient of the Order of the Red Banner of Labor. Jokingly, Klim declares, “I’m going to her!”

Maryana, a master of high-speed plowing, tirelessly rides her motorcycle across the collective farm fields, organizing her team’s work. Despite receiving numerous letters from admirers inspired by her fame, she remains unimpressed. To deter potential suitors, Maryana convinces the brash Nazar Duma to pose as her fiancé.

At a machine and tractor station (MTS) meeting, the chief, Kyrylo Petrovych, reprimands Nazar for his carelessness, joking that marriage might set him straight. Nazar seizes the moment to declare Maryana as his bride, but Kyrylo privately advises her against such a match. Maryana firmly asserts her independence, saying, “I don’t need a nanny.”

One evening, Klim encounters Maryana after she has fallen from her motorcycle. Demonstrating his resourcefulness, he helps her home, repairs her motorcycle, and fixes a tractor, earning Maryana’s admiration. She invites him to stay and observe the brigade’s work. Klim quickly wins over the tractor team with his charm, even playing the accordion and singing songs like Three Tankmen.

Nazar, however, insists on playing his role as Maryana’s fiancé, causing Klim to leave in frustration. Although Maryana pleads for him to stay, Klim departs for a neighboring village. Meanwhile, Nazar and his accomplice Savka steal fuel meant for other brigades. Furious, Kyrylo Petrovych demotes Nazar and appoints Klim as the new brigade leader.

Klim’s competence impresses the brigade. He diagnoses tractor issues by sound and organizes tank-driving lessons, firearms training, and gas mask drills. He also pushes the limits of their equipment, attaching a wider plow to the powerful "Stalinets" tractor, which succeeds in plowing the fields. During this work, the team uncovers a World War I German officer's helmet, prompting Kyrylo to warn, “The Germans are eyeing our land again. We'll fight them off!”

Inspired by the team’s efforts, Maryana reads a book about the Battles of Lake Khasan, while Klim leads the brigade in singing the March of the Soviet Tankmen. Nazar, motivated by competition, doubles his output, earning his portrait a spot in the newspaper. This recognition prompts Kyrylo to change his stance, now supporting Nazar as a suitor for Maryana. However, Maryana’s affections lie with Klim.

In a moonlit steppe, Klim and Maryana confess their love. Kyrylo interrupts their tender moment, congratulating them and planning their wedding for after the sowing season. The wedding is a grand celebration, with Klim in military uniform, Maryana in traditional dress, and their team donning suits. As Kyrylo toasts to the tractorists and their readiness to face any enemy, the group sings the March of the Soviet Tankmen, raising their glasses to a portrait of Stalin.

== Cast ==
- Marina Ladynina as Maryana Bazhan
- Nikolay Kryuchkov as Klim Yarko
- Boris Andreyev as Nazar Duma
- Stepan Kayukov as Kirill Petrovich, head of the collective farm
- Pyotr Aleynikov as Savka
- Vladimir Kolchin as Kharitosha
- Olga Borovikova as Franya
- R. Dneprova-Chajka as Markovna
- Pyotr Valerianov as Granddad
- Alexei Dolinin as Firefighter
- Pyotr Savin as tankman, Klim's friend
- Artavazd Kefchiyan as tankman, Klim's friend

== Cultural influence ==
The March of the Soviet Tankmen from this film was widely used in pre-war Soviet propaganda, while other tunes became popular songs, and are still performed.

Tractor Drivers 2 was a parody film made in 1991, whose plot is loosely based on that of Tractor Drivers.
