= Freundschaft siegt =

1952 film

- Directed by: Joris Ivens; Ivan Pyryev
- Release date: 1952
- Running time: 90 minutes
- Country: East Germany
- Language: German

Freundschaft siegt (We are for Peace!) is an East German documentary film about the 3rd World Festival of Youth and Students held in Berlin in 1951. It was directed by Dutch filmmaker Joris Ivens and Soviet filmmaker Ivan Pyryev, and released in 1952.
