= Six P.M. =

1944 film by Ivan Pyryev

- Directed by: Ivan Pyryev
- Written by: Viktor Gusev
- Starring: Marina Ladynina; Ivan Lyubeznov; Yevgeny Samoylov
- Cinematography: Valentin Pavlov
- Edited by: Anna Kulganek
- Music by: Tikhon Khrennikov
- Production company: Mosfilm
- Release date: 1944
- Running time: 94 minutes
- Country: Soviet Union
- Language: Russian

Six P.M. is the 1946 American release title of the 1944 Soviet World War II film At 6 P.M. After the War (Russian: В 6 часов вечера после войны, romanized: V shest chasov vechera posle voyny, (also At six o'clock in the evening after the war) by Ivan Pyryev.

== Plot ==
In the very beginning of the Great Patriotic War, a young artillery officer Pavel (Ivan Lyubeznov) receives a package from an orphanage. In a leave, his comrade and he go to the orphanage to see the children who sent it. Pavel meets there a young woman Varia (Marina Ladynina). They fall in love from the first sight. They agree to meet again in Moscow "in 6 p.m. after the War'. Varia joins the army and becomes an anti-aircraft gunner. Varia and Pavel meet again after the War.

== The title ==
The Russian film title alludes to the agreement of the Good Soldier Švejk and sapper Vodička on their way to the front, to meet at the pub "By the Chalice" (U Kalicha) "at 6 p.m. after the war". In the film, the two young lovers agree to meet at 6 p.m. after the war at the Bolshoy Kamenny Bridge in Moscow. Since then the expression has become a Russian catch phrase.

Another version connects the title with a poem written by the Soviet poet Yevgeniy Dolmatovsky during the Winter war with Finland in 1940. The poem entitled merely '6 P.M." has the line "at 6 P.M. after the War" as the refrain.

== Facts about the film ==
- The film predicted that the War would end in May.
- The film earned the 1946 Stalin Prize of 2nd degree for the director, the composer Tikhon Khrennikov, screenwriter Viktor Gusev, and lead actors Marina Ladynina, Ivan Lyubeznov, and Yevgeny Samoylov.

== Cast ==
- Marina Ladynina - Varia Pankova
- Ivan Lyubeznov - Lieutenant Pavel Demidov
- Yevgeny Samoylov - senior lieutenant Vasily Kudryashov
- Ariadne Lisak - Fenya, Varia's friend
- Elena Savitskaya - Aunt Katya, building manager
- Yevgeny Morgunov - artilleryman
- Mikhail Pugovkin - artilleryman
- Tatyana Barysheva - resident of house number 5
- Irina Murzaeva - pianist
- Lyudmila Semyonova - anti-aircraft gunner
- Aleksandr Antonov - commander
- Margarita Zharov - collective farm girl (uncredited)
- Alexandra Danilova - anti-aircraft gunner (uncredited)
- Stepan Krylov - military (uncredited)
- Tatiana Govorkov - neighbor (uncredited)
