= Cossacks of the Kuban =

- Directed by: Ivan Pyryev
- Written by: Nikolai Pogodin
- Starring: Marina Ladynina; Sergei Lukyanov; Yuri Lyubimov; Aleksandr Khvylya; Klara Luchko
- Cinematography: Valentin Pavlov
- Edited by: Anna Kulganek
- Music by: Isaak Dunayevsky
- Production company: Mosfilm
- Release date: 1950
- Running time: 112 minutes
- Country: Soviet Union
- Language: Russian

Cossacks of the Kuban (Russian: Кубанские казаки, romanized: Kubanskie kazaki) from Mosfilm is a color film, glorifying the life of the farmers in the kolkhoz of the Soviet Union's Kuban region, directed by Ivan Pyryev and starring Marina Ladynina, his wife at that time. The movie premiered on 26 February 1950.

== Synopsis ==
The film is set in the early post-war years and centers on the rivalry between two Kuban collective farms, "Red Partisans" and "Precepts of Ilyich." This competition extends to their leaders: the bold and proud Gordei Voron (Sergey Lukyanov) and the strong-willed Galina Peresvetova (Marina Ladynina). Amid this rivalry, a budding romance develops between Nikolai Kovylev (Vladlen Davydov), a skilled horse breeder from "Precepts of Ilyich," and Dasha Shelest (Klara Luchko), an exemplary worker from "Red Partisans." Their mutual affection faces obstacles as their respective leaders are unwilling to lose such valuable workers to the other farm.

Dasha, who was raised by Voron like a daughter, asserts her independence, negotiating that their future be determined by the outcome of a horse race during the autumn fair. Nikolai's victory secures their union, but traditions dictate that they must move to the bridegroom's collective farm. Despite his reservations, Voron reluctantly accepts the couple's decision. Meanwhile, tensions between Voron and Peresvetova come to a head. Galina, who has long harbored feelings for Gordei, intentionally lets him win during a cart race at the fair, finally revealing her affection.

The film concludes with Gordei pursuing Galina as she travels alone across the steppe. Overcoming his pride, he demands a confession of her feelings, which she gives, setting the stage for a future of unity and shared purpose between the two farms, as well as their leaders. The narrative captures themes of love, community, and reconciliation against the backdrop of post-war agricultural revival.

== Cast (partial list) ==
- Marina Ladynina as Galina
- Sergei Lukyanov as Gordei Gordeyich Voron
- Vladimir Volodin as Anton Petrovich Mudretsov
- Yuri Lyubimov as Andrey
- Aleksandr Khvylya as Denis Stepanovich
- Klara Luchko as Darya Shelest
- Ekaterina Savinova as Lubochka
- Viktor Avdyushko as stableman
- Valentina Telegina as Khristoforovna
- Vladlen Davydov as Nikolai Matveyevich Kovalev

== Songs (partial list) ==
- Harvest (in Russian: Урожай, words by Mikhail Isakovsky and music by Isaak Dunayevsky)
- How Have You Been, Dearest? (in Russian: Каким ты был, ditto)
- Oh, the Kalina Trees Are in Bloom (Russian: Ой, цветет калина, ditto)

== See also ==
- Cinema of the Soviet Union
- Cinema of Russia
- Kolkhoz
- Kuban
- Kuban Cossacks
- Ballad of Siberia
