= Party Membership Card =

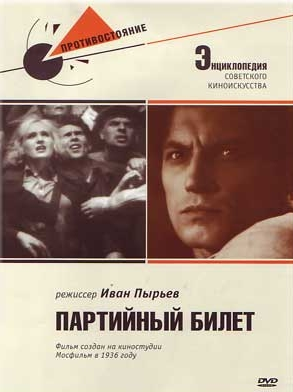
- Russian: Партийный билет
- Directed by: Ivan Pyryev
- Written by: Ekaterina Vinogradskaya
- Produced by: G. Kharlamov
- Starring: Erast Garin; Stepan Kayukov; Aleksei Matov; A. Chekayevsky; Nina Latonina
- Cinematography: Anatoliy Solodkov
- Music by: Valeri Zhelobinsky
- Release date: 1936
- Country: Soviet Union
- Language: Russian

Party Membership Card (Russian: Партийный билет) is a 1936 Soviet crime drama film directed by Ivan Pyryev.

== Plot ==
The team of one Moscow plant is joined by Siberians Pavel Kurganov, who is distinguished by his intelligence and diligence, thanks to which he almost immediately becomes a production leader and marries the most productive factory worker Anna Kulikova. It would seem everything is fine, but Pavel is a spy.

== Cast ==
- Andrei Abrikosov as Pavel Kurganov
- Anatoliy Goryunov as Feodor
- Igor Maleyev as Yasha
- Ada Vojtsik as Anna
