= Devotion (1954 film) =

- Russian: Испытание верности
- Directed by: Ivan Pyryev
- Written by: Ivan Pyryev; Leonid Tur; Pyotr Tur
- Starring: Sergei Romodanov; Marina Ladynina; Leonid Gallis; Vasili Toporkov; Nina Grebeshkova; Aleksandr Mikhaylov
- Cinematography: Valentin Pavlov
- Edited by: Anna Kulganek
- Music by: Isaak Dunayevsky
- Release date: December 1, 1954; Soviet Union
- Running time: 117 minutes
- Country: Soviet Union
- Language: Russian

Devotion (Russian: Испытание верности) is a 1954 Soviet film directed by Ivan Pyryev.

== Plot ==
An elderly worker, Yegor Lutonin at one moment begins to realize that his daughters are unhappy and decides to help them.

Andrei Kalmykov, the husband of Olga, the eldest daughter of Yegor Lutonin loves another woman and after work drives to her. Andrei suffers greatly from this duality, but he cannot help himself. At last, the mistress puts to Andrey a rigid condition: to divorce the wife or to forget about her. Plucking up courage, Andrei goes home and confessed to Olga, who for a long time already all guessed. But Andrei is an exemplary employee, a member of the Communist Party and, in addition, he posts one of the senior positions at the plant, has a personal chauffeur. For these reasons he is not allowed to divorce. In the end the Kalmykov loses both of his beloved women.

Lutonin's younger daughter, Varya, falls in love with a new engineer at the car factory, and already decides to marry him, but Yegor Lutonin is in no hurry to give his parental consent: something does not satisfy him in this young man. Soon it becomes clear that the apprehensions are not groundless: he appropriated the invention of Petya, who loves Varya, and after a little time, it is also revealed that he pays part of the salary on the writ of execution of his mother. Varya is shocked and depressed that he is not the person she imagined him to be.

Andrew goes to Chukotka to lay the railway. Once in the North, he is increasingly aware of his mistake and guilt towards Olga.

Former driver of Andrey comes home to Lutonins and tells Olga that the plane on which Andrei flew, had an accident, and he is in hospital. She decides immediately to go to him, and at the end of the film she comes to him in the hospital and their fates are reunited once again.

The film ends with a kind of "confession" of Yegor Lutonin to his old friend Savva Ryabchikov.

== Cast ==
- Sergei Romodanov as Yegor Kuzmich Lutonin
- Marina Ladynina as Olga Yegorovna Kalmykova
- Leonid Gallis as Andrey Petrovich Kalmykov
- Vasili Toporkov as Savva Vikentevich Ryabchikov
- Nina Grebeshkova as Varya Lutonina
- Aleksandr Mikhaylov as Petya Grebenkin
- Stanislav Chekan as Vasya Zhuk
- Oleg Golubitsky as Igor Vladimirovich Varentsov
- Zinaida Rudneva as Agniya Vasilayevna
- Nikolai Timofeyev as Aleksey Stepanovich Bobrov
- Yuriy Medvedev as Fyodor Akimovich Yerokhin
