= Outskirts (film) =

- Poster
- Directed by: Boris Barnet
- Written by: Boris Barnet; Konstantin Finn
- Starring: Aleksandr Chistyakov; Sergei Komarov; Yelena Kuzmina; Nikolay Bogolyubov; Nikolai Kryuchkov; Hans Klering; Mikhail Zharov; Vladimir Uralsky
- Cinematography: Mikhail Kirillov; A. Spiridonov
- Music by: Sergei Vasilenko
- Production company: Mezhrabpomfilm
- Release date: 25 March 1933 (Soviet Union)
- Running time: 98 minutes
- Country: Soviet Union
- Languages: Russian; German

Full film

Outskirts (Russian: Окра́ина, meaning "fringe" or "periphery"), also known in English as The Patriots or by the transliterated Russian title Okraina, is a 1933 Soviet film directed by Boris Barnet.

Outskirts is said to have the distinction to be the only Soviet-era film, before World War II, to deal exclusively with World War I.

== Plot summary ==
In a small town in a remote part of the Russian Empire, factory workers struggle to organize against the owners. When World War I comes, they unite as soldiers of the Tsar on the Eastern Front. Local girl Anka forges a relationship with a German POW. The film criticises war profiteers, and encourages workers to reach out to one another across national lines. In 1917, the Tsar is forced to abdicate following the February Revolution.

== Cast ==
- Sergey Komarov — Alexander P. Greshin
- Elena Kuzmina — Anka Greshina
- Robert Erdmann — Robert Karlovich, tenant
- Alexander Chistyakov — Pyotr Kadkin
- Nikolay Bogolyubov — Nikolai Kadkin
- Nikolai Kryuchkov — Senka Kadkin
- Mikhail Zharov — Kraevich
- Hans Klering — Mueller, a German prisoner of war
- Alexander Zhukov — policeman
- Vladimir Ural — Cabby
- Andrew Veit — a German prisoner
- Mikhail Yanshin — soldier
