= Dance Teacher (film) =

- Russian poster
- Russian: Учитель танцев
- Directed by: Tatyana Lukashevich
- Written by: Félix Lope de Vega (play)
- Starring: Vladimir Zeldin; Mark Pertsovskiy; Tatyana Alekseeva; Lyubov Dobrzhanskaya; Vladimir Blagoobrazov; Mikhail Mayorov
- Cinematography: Semyon Sheynin; Nikolay Vlasov
- Music by: Aleksandr Kreyn
- Release date: 1952
- Country: Soviet Union

Dance Teacher (Russian: Учитель танцев) is a 1952 Soviet drama film directed by Tatyana Lukashevich.

== Plot ==
The film tells about a guy named Aldemaro from a poor noble family who is in love with the daughter of a rich signor. He comes up with a pseudonym and, introducing himself as a dance teacher, arrives at their house.

== Starring ==
- Vladimir Zeldin as Aldemaro
- Mark Pertsovskiy as Belardo
- Tatyana Alekseeva as Florela
- Lyubov Dobrzhanskaya as Feliciana
- Vladimir Blagoobrazov as Tebano
- Mikhail Mayorov as Bandalino
- Yakov Khaletskiy as Tullio
- Georgiy Sorokin as Rikaredo
- S. Znamenskiy as Kornecho
- Genrietta Ostrovskaya as Lisena
- Fyodor Savostyanov as Andronio
- Boris Lesovoy as Alberigo
