= A Snow Fairy Tale =

- Russian: Снежная сказка
- Directed by: Aleksei Sakharov; Eldar Shengelaia
- Written by: Viktor Vitkovich; Grigory Yagdfeld
- Starring: Igor Yershov; Alla Kozhokina; Yevgeny Leonov; Klara Luchko; Vera Altayskaya
- Music by: Yuri Levitin
- Production company: Mosfilm
- Release date: 1959
- Running time: 68 minutes
- Country: Soviet Union
- Language: Russian

A Snow Fairy Tale (Russian: Снежная сказка, romanized: Snezhnaya skazka) is a 1959 Soviet fantasy film directed by Aleksei Sakharov and Eldar Shengelaia.

The film takes place before the New Year. The film tells about a boy-dreamer named Mitya, who is trying to convince his friends that his clock have an amazing ability to stop time and can revive a snow woman. Classmates do not believe Mitya, but suddenly his fantasies become reality.

== Plot ==
The night before New Year's Eve, a boy named Mitya, who loves to daydream, jokingly tells his classmates at school that his toy clock—complete with painted hands—is magical and can stop all the clocks in the world, stop time, or even bring to life a snowman. Of course, no one believes him. But Mitya's wildest fantasies suddenly come true: the snowman into which Mitya placed the clock, instead of a heart, comes to life, transforming into a beautiful girl whom he names Lyolya.

The Old Year, a mysterious and deceitful old man who fears and resists the coming of the New Year (which symbolizes his own end), learns of the clock's existence and decides to take it to stop time and forever preserve his own existence. He believes he is helping people by doing so. Despite futilely trying to persuade Mitya and Lyolya to give him the clock, the Old Year seizes a box containing three ordinary items—a coin, a piece of charcoal, and a scrap of paper with a wax seal. With these magical objects, he brings three more snowmen to life as his assistants, seeking to locate the magical clock in time before the arrival of the New Year.

== Cast ==
- Igor Yershov as Mitya (voiced by Margarita Korabelnikova)
- Alla Kozhokina as Lyolya (voiced by Margarita Korabelnikova)
- Yevgeny Leonov as Old Year
- Zinaida Naryshkina as Paper Soul
- Klara Luchko as Black Soul
- Vera Altayskaya as Sale Soul
- Nikolai Sergeyev as Petushkov the Time Master
- Mikhail Pugovkin as chauffeur (voiced by Yuri Sarantsev)
