= In the Rear of the Enemy =

- Russian: В тылу врага
- Directed by: Yevgeni Shneider
- Written by: R. Bershadsky
- Starring: Nikolay Kryuchkov; Aleksandr Grechanyy; Pavel Shpringfeld; Aleksandr Baranov; Pyotr Sobolevsky
- Cinematography: Nikolai Prozorovsky; Aleksandr Shelenkov
- Music by: David Blok
- Release date: 1941
- Country: Soviet Union
- Language: Russian

In the Rear of the Enemy (Russian: В тылу врага) is a 1941 Soviet World War II film directed by Yevgeni Shneider.

The film tells of the courage of a group of Soviet scouts who enter the enemy's rear, namely, the farm that the White Finns left.

== Plot ==
The events depicted in the film take place during the Winter War of 1939–1940. A team of three Soviet scouts, led by Red Army soldier Boykov, infiltrates enemy lines and hides in the attic of a farmhouse temporarily abandoned by Finnish forces. From their concealed position, they establish telephone communication with their headquarters.

However, Finnish troops unexpectedly arrive and begin hurriedly setting up artillery positions. A fierce skirmish ensues between the scouts and the Finnish soldiers. Boykov remains in the attic, defending himself against the enemy while skillfully directing his group's artillery fire. Despite his efforts, he sustains a severe injury during the intense battle.

== Cast ==
- Nikolay Kryuchkov
- Aleksandr Grechanyy
- Pavel Shpringfeld
- Aleksandr Baranov
- Pyotr Sobolevsky
- Pyotr Savin
- Nikolai Ryzhov
- Nikolai Yarochkin
