= Klara Luchko =

Soviet, Russian and Ukrainian actress

- Клара Лучко
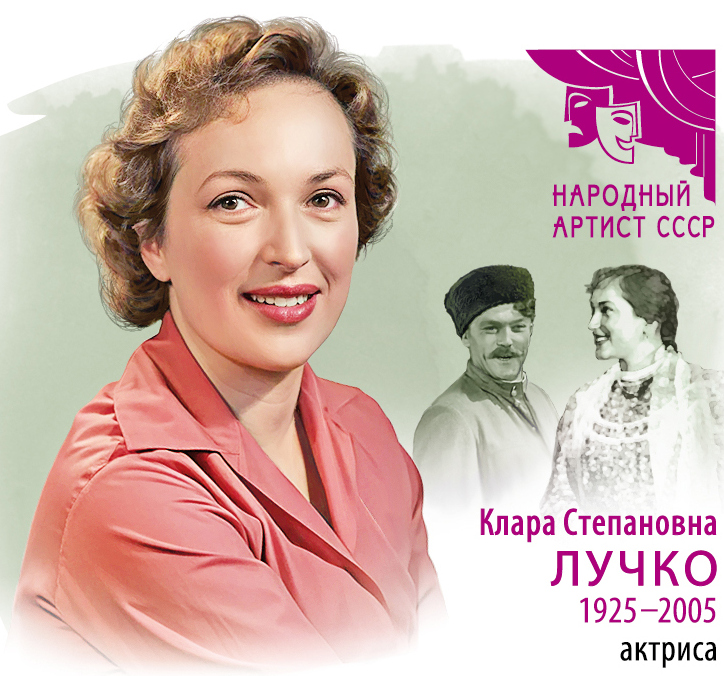
- Luchko on a 2025 postcard of Russia
- Born: 1 July 1925; Chutove, Ukrainian SSR, Soviet Union
- Died: 26 March 2005 (aged 79); Moscow, Russia
- Resting place: Novodevichy Cemetery, Moscow
- Occupation: Film actress
- Years active: 1948–2005
- Notable work: Cossacks of the Kuban (1949)
- Title: People's Artist of the USSR (1985)
- Awards: USSR State Prize (1951)

Klara Stepanivna Luchko (Ukrainian: Клара Степанівна Лучко; Russian: Кла́ра Степа́новна Лучко́; 1 July 1925 – 26 March 2005) was a Soviet, Russian and Ukrainian actress known for her roles in the Soviet cinema.

She received the title of People's Artist of the USSR, the highest honour that could be bestowed to a cinema artist, in 1978. She was awarded the Order "For Merit to the Fatherland" 4th class (2000).

== Selected filmography ==
- Michurin (Russian: Мичурин, 1948) as guest
- The Young Guard (Молодая гвардия, 1948) as Aunt Marina
- Cossacks of the Kuban (Кубанские казаки, 1949) as Darya Shelest
- The Return of Vasili Bortnikov (Возращение Василия Бортникова, 1953) as Natalya
- A Big Family (Большая семья, 1954) as Lida Zhurbina
- Twelfth Night (Двенадцатая ночь, 1955) as Viola / Sebastian
- A Snow Fairy Tale (Снежная сказка, 1959) as Black Soul
- Dreams of Love – Liszt (Szerelmi álmok – Liszt, 1970) as Marie d'Agoult
- The Gypsy (Цыган, 1979) as Claudia Pukhlyakova
- The Casket of Maria Medici (Ларец Марии Медичи, 1980) as Madam Locar
- Do Not Part with Your Beloved (С любимыми не расставайтесь, 1980) as Larisa's mother
- Carnival (Карнавал, 1981) as Josephine Viktorovna, the wife of Mikhail Solomatin
- We, The Undersigned (Мы, нижеподписавшиеся, 1981) as Violetta Matveyevna Nuikina
- Anxious Sunday (Тревожное воскресенье, 1983) as Anna Golovina
- Budulai's Return (Вовзращение Будулая, 1985) as Claudia Pukhlyakova
