= The Rich Bride =

1937 film by Ivan Pyryev

- Russian: Богатая невеста
- Directed by: Ivan Pyryev
- Written by: Vladimir Dobrovolsky; Evgeniy Pomeshchikov
- Produced by: Vladimir Legoshin
- Starring: Marina Ladynina; Boris Bezgin; Ivan Lyubeznov; Stepan Shagaida; Fyodor Kurikhin
- Cinematography: Vladimir Okulich
- Music by: Isaak Dunayevsky
- Release date: 1937
- Country: Soviet Union
- Language: Russian

The Rich Bride (Russian: Богатая невеста), also translated as The Country Bride, is a 1937 Soviet romantic musical film directed by Ivan Pyryev.

== Plot ==
In love with each other, the tractor driver Pavlo and the collective farmer Marina work together to harvest the harvest at the local collective farm. But Pavlo has a rival - bookkeeper Kovynko, also in love with Marina.

== Cast ==
- Marina Ladynina as Maria Alexandrovna "Marinka" Lukash
- Boris Bezgin as Pavlo Zgara
- Ivan Lyubeznov as Alexei Kovinko
- Stepan Shagaida as Sidor Vassilyevich Balaba, the barber
- Fyodor Kurikhin as Naum Vassilyevich "Granddad" Vorkun (as F.N. Kurikhin)
- Anna Dmokhovskaya as Palaga Fedorovna, work forewoman
- Aleksandr Antonov as Danilo Petrovich, work foreman
- Ivan Matveyev as Senka, tractor driver
- Lyubov Sveshnikova as Froska, worker
- Dmitriy Kapka
- Ivan Bondar
- Nataliya Gebdovskaya
