= They Met in Moscow =

- Directed by: Ivan Pyryev
- Written by: Viktor Gusev
- Starring: Marina Ladynina; Vladimir Zeldin
- Cinematography: Valentin Pavlov
- Music by: Tikhon Khrennikov
- Production company: Mosfilm
- Release date: 30 November 1941
- Running time: 87 minutes
- Country: Soviet Union
- Language: Russian

They Met in Moscow (Russian: Свинарка и пастух, romanized: Svinarka i pastukh, English: Swine-herd and Stableman) is a 1941 Soviet romantic musical film directed by Ivan Pyryev.

== Plot ==
Swineherd Glasha and stableman Kuzma from a farm in what is now the Vologda Oblast of Russia are sent to an agricultural exhibition in Moscow. Kuzma is popular among the girls there, and makes passes at Glasha, but is not too bright, and thinks only of Moscow shops. Glasha, at the behest of her grandmother, carefully studies the know-how of other swine-breeders.

By chance she meets at the exhibition a Dagestan shepherd Musaib from an aul, and they end up falling in love with each other. They agree to meet at the Union Agricultural Exhibition again in a year.

As Glasha returns to the farm she seeks to build a new pigsty, she takes care of the swine and invents a feeder for piglets.

Kuzma just keeps strolling through the village with an accordion and being a nuisance to Glasha.

Musaib with his dog encounters three wolves and scrambles to protect the best sheep of the flock.

Musaib sends letters to Glasha. But no one can read them. Kuzma is called to help and gives Glasha a fake, in which it is written that Musaib is a married man. Kuzma comforts the unhappy Glasha. Their wedding is scheduled for St. Peter's Day.

At the next year All-Union Agricultural Exhibition, Musaib learns about Glasha's wedding and goes to her village. Just in time he manages to come before the wedding and explains everything to Glasha. She banishes Kuzma in a scandal.

== Cast ==
- Marina Ladynina - Glafira Andreyevna "Glasha" Novikova
- Vladimir Zeldin - Musahib Gatuyev
- Nikolai Kryuchkov - Kuzma Sergeyevich Petrov
- Nasyr Kitayev as Ivan Ivanovich, aka Uncle Vanya (as N. Kitayev)
- Grigori Alekseyev as Abdusalam (as G. Alekseyev)
- Ye. Schastlivtseva as Glasha's Grandmother
- Osip Abdulov as Bartender
- Tikhon Khrennikov
- Tatyana Govorkova as Collective Farmer (uncredited)
- Zoya Zhukova as Glasha's friend (uncredited)

== Interesting facts ==
- Geographically minor settlements in which the events of the picture unfold, are here to this very day.
- The first significant film role of actor Vladimir Zeldin. He got his in the film by chance. For the role of the shepherd from the North Caucasus Musaib Gatuev many Georgian actors auditioned alongside Vladimir. Pyryev could not decide whom to pick. Then he gathered the female crewmembers in the screening room and showed them the screen tests. And almost unanimously, women chose Zeldin.
- Expedition to Kabardino-Balkaria was completed on June 22, 1941. After the start of World War II actors were mobilized and sent to the tank school. But after a while all of the men involved in the film, on Stalin's orders were returned to "Mosfilm". Scenes were filmed at the Agricultural Exhibition in two shifts. It often happened that began raids by German aircraft, bombing, sirens wailing while filming. The crew went to the bomb shelter and then after the bombing returned to work. Filming ended in evacuation at Alma-Ata.
- On TV even today the film is shown with cuts made back in the day of the fight against the attributes of Stalin's cult of personality: from the opening credits the mention of director Pyrev is withdrawn because in the credits the phrase "Stalin's order bearer" was added to his name, and there is no frame with Stalin's statue at the Agricultural Exhibition. The full version of the picture was recorded on videotape film union "Close-Up" in the "Russian Film Classics" series.
- There is a legend based on the memoirs of Yaroslav Golovanov that the film was on the Soviet Central Television at the time of the first Moon landing of the Apollo 11 crew, when more than 1 billion people in the rest of the world were watching the live broadcast from the Moon. However, at 6 o'clock in the morning, Moscow time, the Central Television of the USSR did not air programs; in 1969 programs on CT only started at 8am.
