= Utagoe coffeehouse =

Coffeehouse with singing

An utagoe coffeehouse (歌声喫茶, utagoe kissa) was a type of coffeehouse that featured the customers joining in singing songs together, which was very popular in Japan c. 1955–1975.

Utagoe coffeehouses were usually associated with the leftist movement at that time, called the Utagoe movement, supported by the labor unions, backed up by the socialist and communist parties. The songs that were sung, therefore, were mostly anti-establishment, anti-war songs that included many of Russian, Eastern European and Chinese origins.

Most of the utagoe coffeehouses went out of business c. 1995–2005, giving way to the karaoke houses that became big business during the 1980s, but two or three utagoe coffeehouses still exist in Tokyo, such as Tomoshibi.
