= Vladimir Zeldin =

Soviet and Russian actor

- Владимир Зельдин
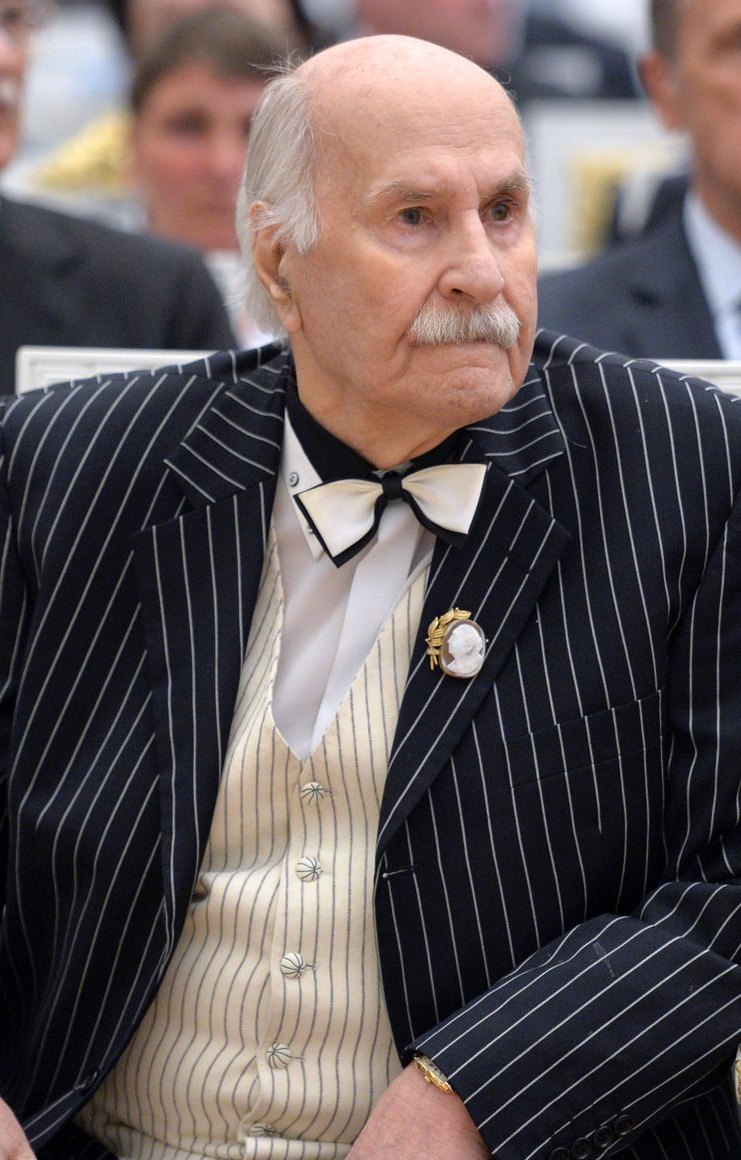
- Zeldin in 2015
- Born: 10 February 1915; Kozlov, Tambov Governorate, Russian Empire
- Died: 31 October 2016 (aged 101); Moscow, Russia
- Occupation: Actor
- Years active: 1927–2016
- Awards: Full cavalier of the Order "For Merit to the Fatherland"

Vladimir Mikhailovich Zeldin (Russian: Владимир Михайлович Зельдин; 10 February 1915 – 31 October 2016) was a Soviet and Russian stage and film actor. A centenarian, he was among the longest-serving stage performers and continued acting up until his death.

== Early life ==
Zeldin was born in the town of Kozlov (now Michurinsk, Tambov Oblast of Russia), the youngest of five children. With the start of the Russian Civil War the family moved to their relatives in Tver. His mother Anna Nikolayevna Zeldina (née Popova, 1884–1931) was a native Russian teacher turned a housewife. His father Mikhail Yevgenyevich Zeldin (1876–1928) was a musician of Jewish origin who converted to Russian Orthodoxy to enter the Moscow Conservatory; he served as a kapellmeister in the Imperial Russian Army concert band and as the head of the Kozlov and Tver music schools after the October Revolution. Vladimir himself was raised in the Russian Orthodox traditions and associated himself with Russian culture.

In 1924 the family moved to Moscow. Zeldin continued studying at the secondary school. He also learned to play trumpet, piano and violin, and at the age of 12 tried to enter The Bolshoi Theatre Ballet School. According to Zeldin, his father wished him a better career and was highly against this decision, so he did everything to prevent his son from entering the school. For several years Vladimir played trumpet in the military band under the Joint State Political Directorate led by his father's friend Feodor Nikolaevsky. In 1935 he graduated from the theatre college at the Mossovet Theatre where he studied under Evgeny Lepkovsky and became its actor.

== Career ==
In 1938 Zeldin moved to the Moscow Transport Theatre (modern-day Gogol Center) where he performed as Antipholus of Syracuse in The Comedy of Errors and Ferdinand in Intrigue and Love, among other roles.

Zeldin became an all-Union celebrity in 1941 starring in the leading role in the musical comedy They Met in Moscow by Ivan Pyryev. His other famous movie works include Boris Olenich in Ballad of Siberia (1947), Aldemaro in Dance Teacher (1952), a clown in Carnival Night (1956), Aleksandr Vladimirovich Serebryakov in Uncle Vanya (1970), Judge in Desyat Negrityat (1987) and grandfather in Cops and Robbers (1997), a remake of the Italian comedy of the same name.

During the Battle of Moscow he and other actors were evacuated to Almaty where he played in the Alma-Ata Russian Drama Theatre. He also visited the frontline to perform for soldiers and was awarded the Medal "For Valiant Labour in the Great Patriotic War 1941–1945" after the war.

From 1945 to his death Zeldin performed in the Russian Army Theatre. His most famous role was Aldemaro in The Dancing Master play by Lope de Vega. Other popular roles include Tranio in The Taming of the Shrew, Aleksandr Vladimirovich Serebryakov in Uncle Vanya, Albert Gregor in The Makropulos Affair, Frank Gardner in Mrs. Warren's Profession and others. The Most Honest, a satirical play about an elderly Baron Munchausen, was written by Grigori Gorin on Zeldin's suggestion and with him in mind. It was an enormous success and was later adapted by Mark Zakharov into a TV movie The Very Same Munchhausen with Oleg Yankovsky in the lead.

In February 2005 Zeldin celebrated his 90th birthday by performing in the new musical Man of La Mancha (which premiered in December 2004) where he starred both as Don Quixote and Miguel de Cervantes. The role of Don Quixote quickly became his signature role and he closely associated himself with the character.

He celebrated his 101st birthday on stage by performing the leading role in the play Dance with the Master (loosely based on The Dancing Master) and written specially for him. According to the director Yuli Gusman, a total of 200 performances of Man of La Mancha and Dance with the Master were staged during Zeldin's lifetime. Man of La Mancha was last shown just a month prior to the actor's death. Due to a recent hip fracture, he had to perform with a walking stick.

== Later years ==
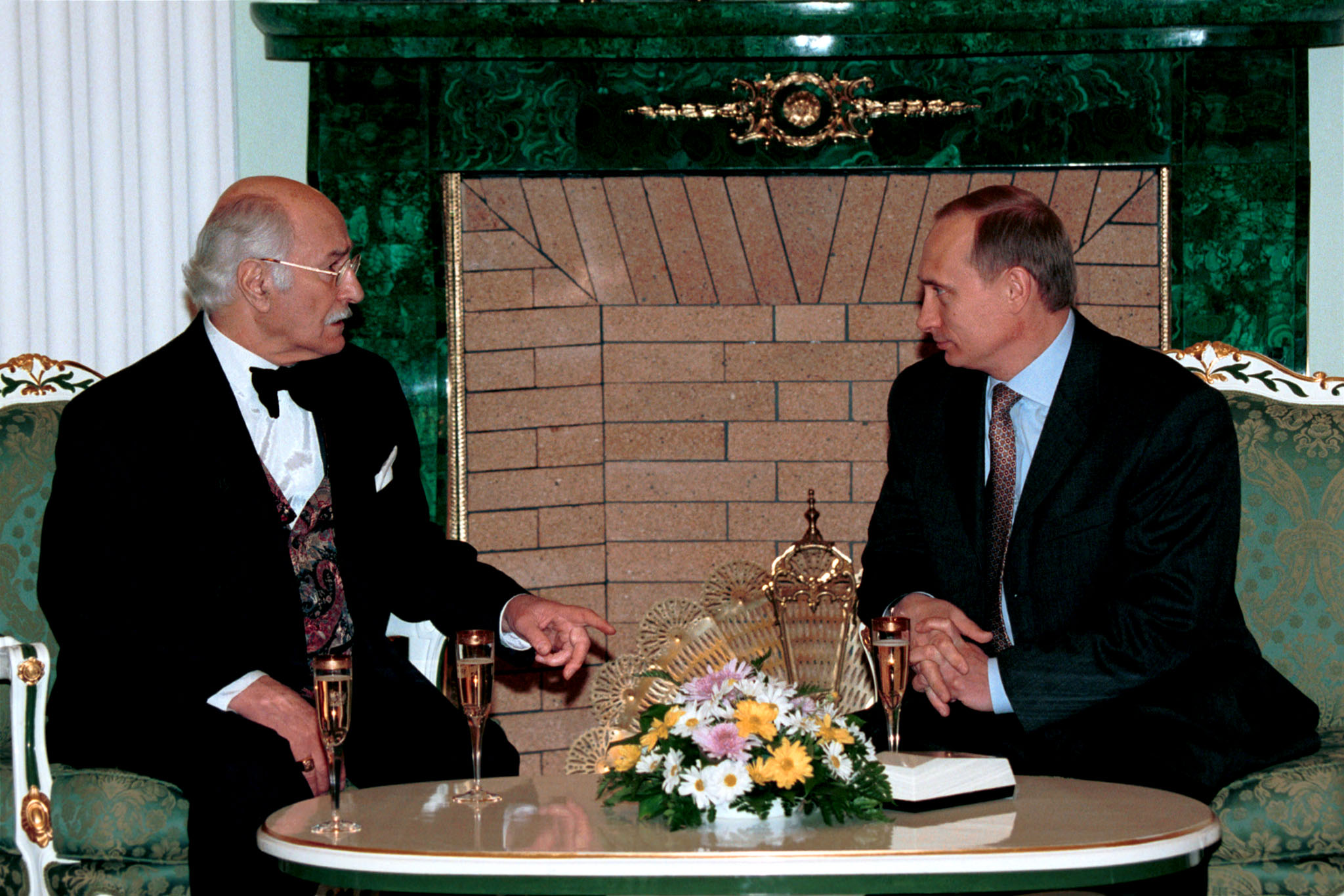
With Vladimir Putin on celebrating of 85th birthday

Zeldin was, as of 2014, the oldest living People's Artist of the USSR. He turned 101 in 2016. In June 2005, his signature appeared under the open letter by "members of culture, science and public representatives" published in Izvestia where they supposedly expressed support to the court decision concerning the former Yukos management. A number of signatories, including Zeldin, denied their involvement.

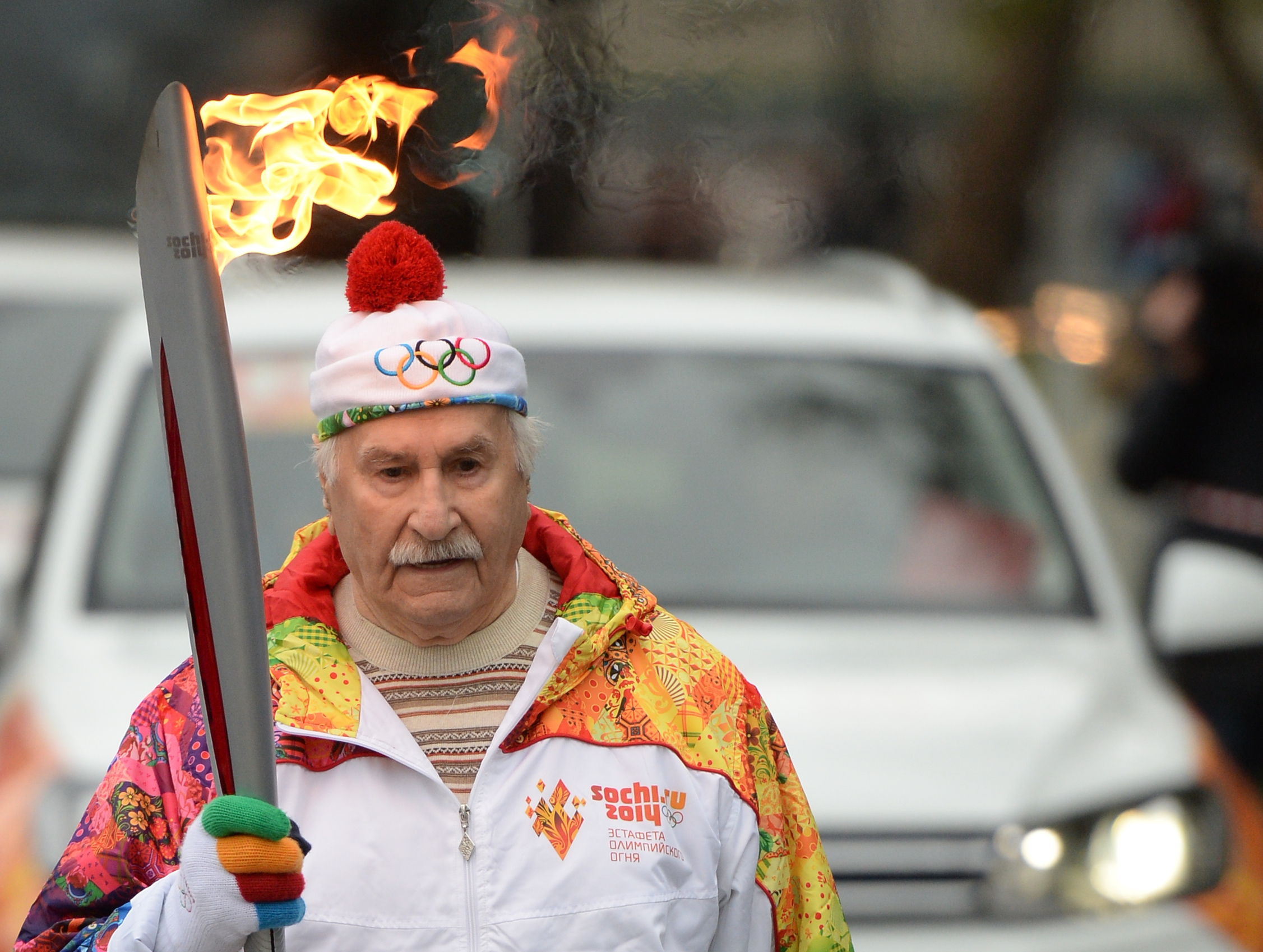
On torch relay of 2014 Summer Olympics, 7 October 2013

In October 2013, at the age of 98 he took part in the 2014 Winter Olympics torch relay, becoming the oldest torchbearer in history for that time.

Vladimir Zeldin died on 31 October 2016 and was buried at the Novodevichy Cemetery in Moscow. He was survived by his third wife Ivetta Evgenievna Kapralova-Zeldina (1933–2017) who died just two months after her husband and was buried near him. They lived together for 52 years.

Vladimir Zeldin's only son (from his first civil wife Lyudmila Martynova) died of a gastric infection at the age of 18 months in 1941.

== Honours and awards ==
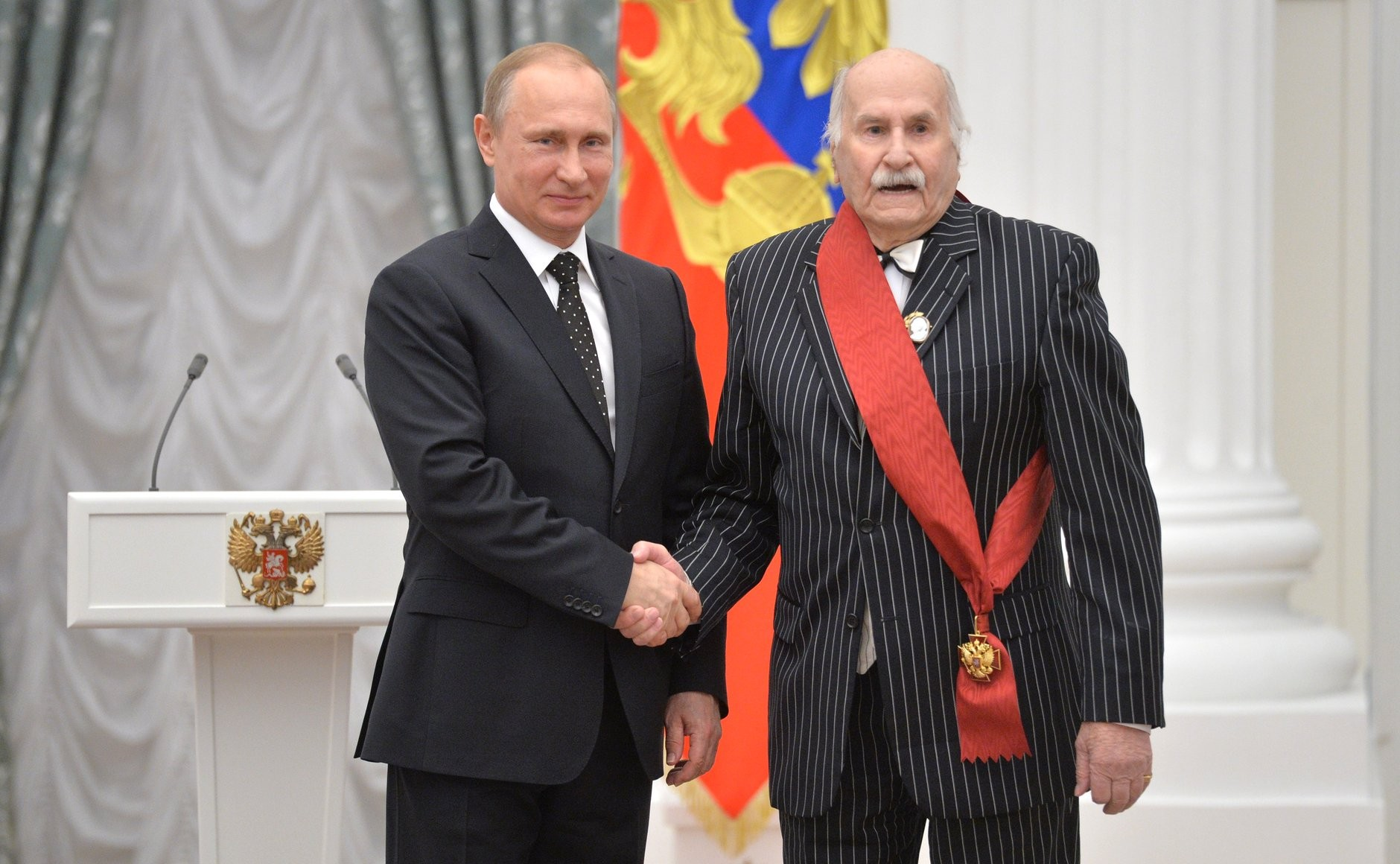
Presentation of the Order "For Merit to the Fatherland", 1st class, 21 May 2015

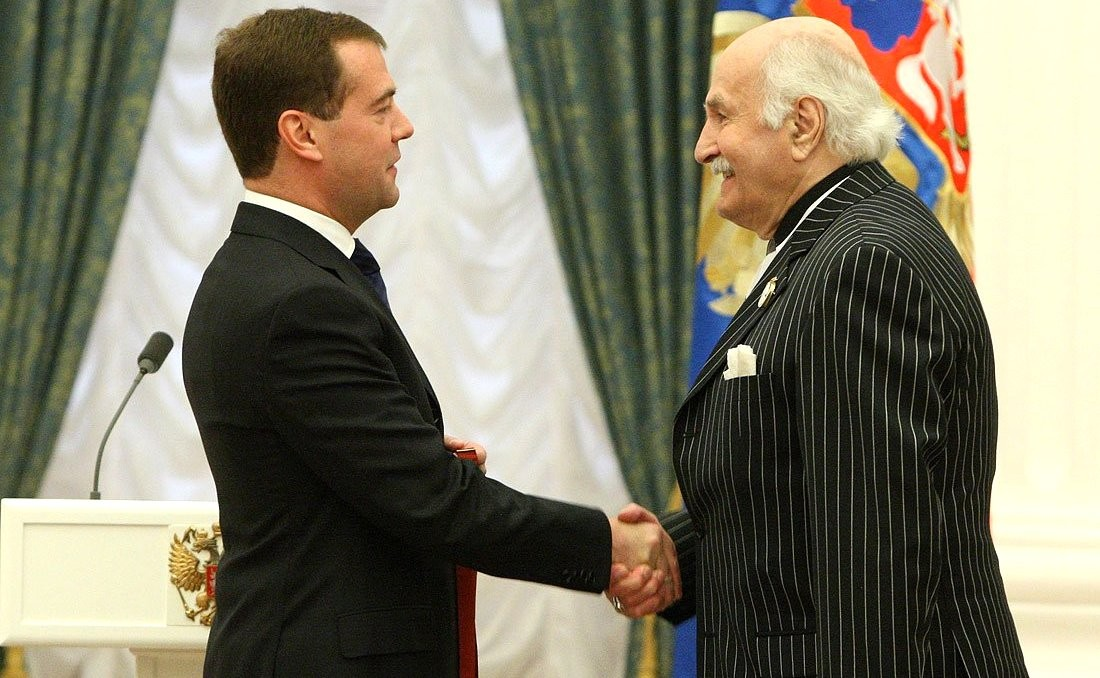
Presentation of the Order "For Merit to the Fatherland", 2nd class, 6 May 2010

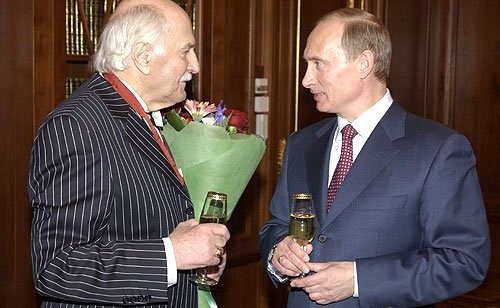
Presentation of the Order "For Merit to the Fatherland", 3rd class, 12 February 2005

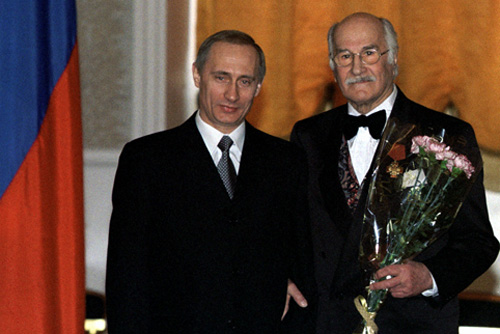
Presentation of the Order "For Merit to the Fatherland", 4th class, 23 February 2000

- Order "For Merit to the Fatherland";
  - 1st class (20 January 2015)
  - 2nd class (10 February 2010) – for outstanding contribution to the development of theatrical art, and many years of creative activity
  - 3rd class (10 February 2005) – for outstanding contribution to the development of theatrical art, and many years of creative activity
  - 4th class (10 February 2000) – for outstanding contribution to the development of domestic theatrical art
- Order of Friendship (21 June 1995) – for services to the state, achievements in work and significant contribution to strengthening friendship and cooperation between peoples
- Order of the Red Banner of Labour, three times (1968, 1980, ?)
- People's Artist of the USSR (1975)
- People's Artist of the RSFSR (1959)
- Honored Artist of the RSFSR (1954)
- Gratitude "for outstanding creative achievement in musical theatre" National Festival "Musical Heart of Theatre" (2006)
- Prize of the Russian Federation in the field of culture (2008) – for the play "Man of La Mancha"
- Stalin Prize, 2nd class (1951)
- Prize "for the honour and dignity" of the National Theatre Award Golden Mask (2010)
- Medal "In Commemoration of the 850th Anniversary of Moscow"

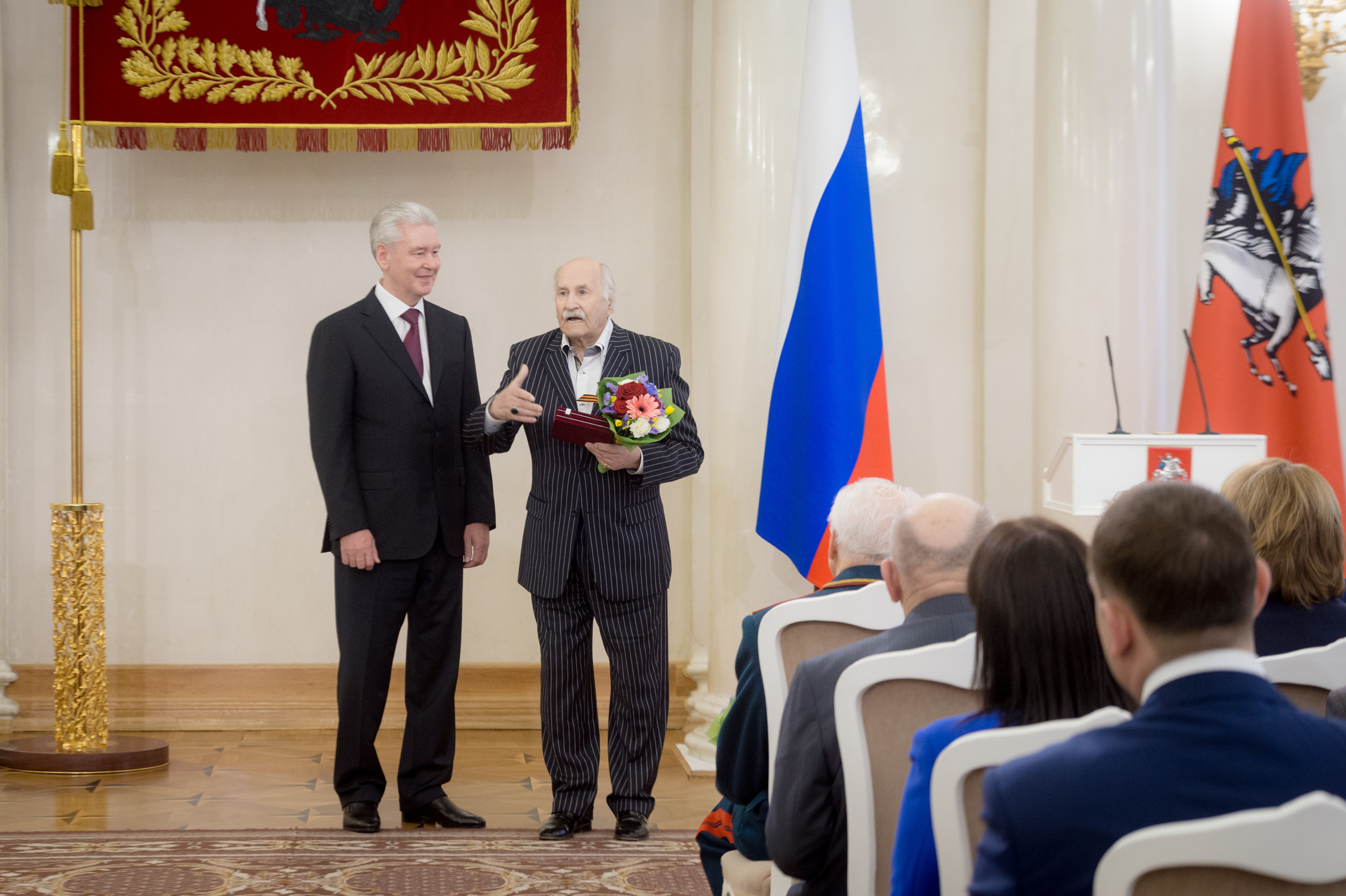
With Mayor of Moscow Sergey Sobyanin on presentation ceremony of the Jubilee Medal "70 Years of Victory in the Great Patriotic War 1941–1945", 8 May 2015

- Medal "For Valiant Labour in the Great Patriotic War 1941–1945"
- Medal "Veteran of Labour"

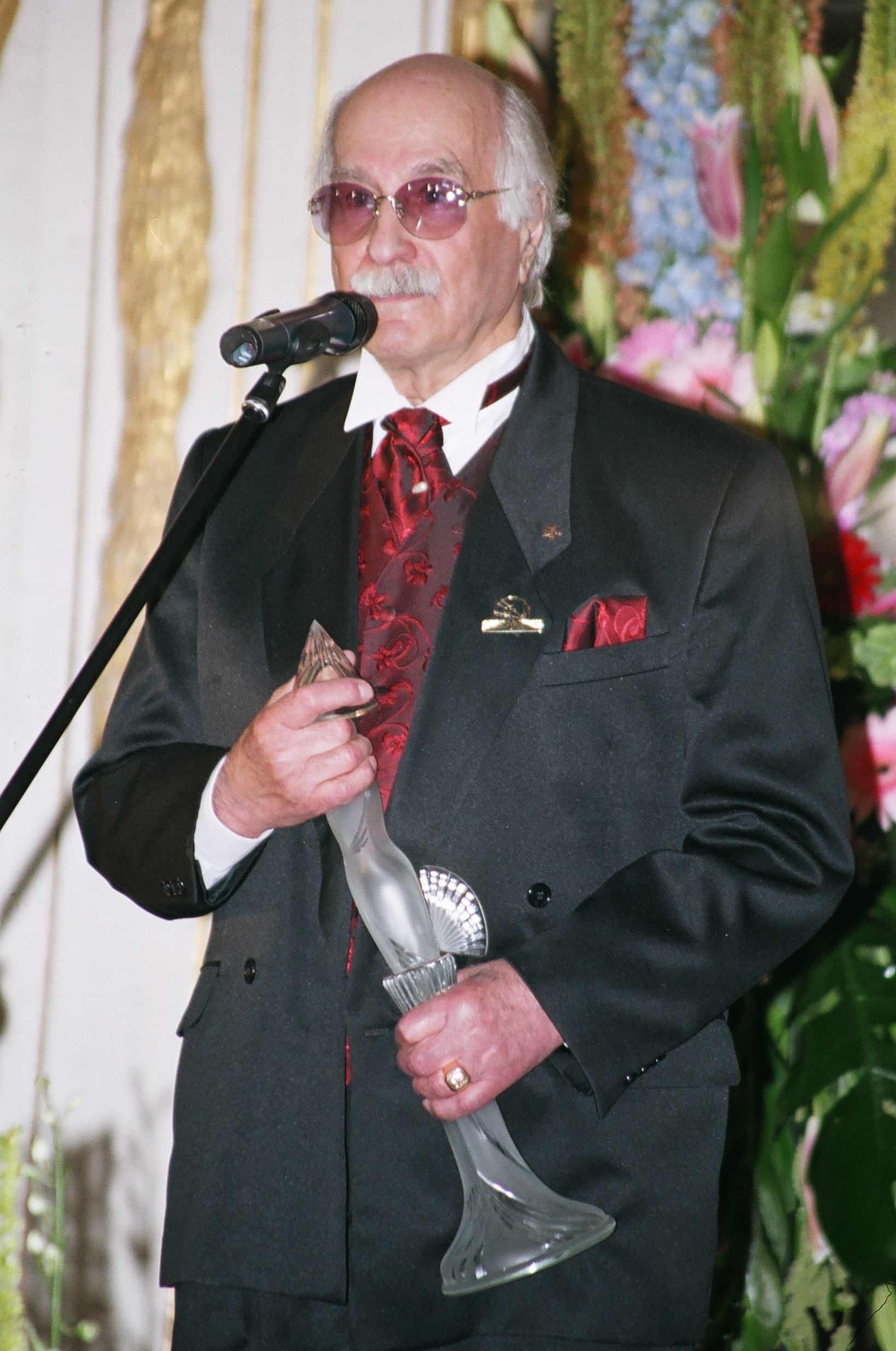
Presentation of Crystal Turandot-2005

== Partial filmography ==
- 1938: The Oppenheim Family (Семья Оппенгейм) (TV Series) – (uncredited)
- 1941: They Met in Moscow (Свинарка и пастух) – Musaib Gatyev
- 1944: Ivan the Terrible (Иван Грозный) – assistant to the Livonian ambassador
- 1948: Ballad of Siberia (Сказание о земле Сибирской) – Boris Olenich
- 1952: Dance Teacher (Учитель танцев) – Aldemaro
- 1956: V kvadrate 45 – Boris Shmelyov diversant
- 1956: Carnival Night (Карнавальная ночь) – Nikolayev / Tip Clown
- 1961: Chronicle of Flaming Years (Повесть пламенных лет) – Yevgeniy Gribovskiy
- 1965: The Tsar's Bride – Bomely
- 1965: The Salvos of the Aurora Cruiser – poruchik Andronnikov
- 1967: Bereg nadezhdy – Vandenberg
- 1968: Neoknchennaya simfoniya – Kherbek
- 1970: Uncle Vanya (Дядя Ваня) – Professor Aleksandr V. Serebryakov
- 1971: Mission in Kabul – Major Stein
- 1974: With You and Without You – Yevstigney – Fyodor's Father
- 1974: Blokada: Luzhskiy rubezh, Pulkovskiy meredian – von Leeb
- 1975: Na kray sveta – otets Volodi
- 1976: We Didn't Learn This – kapitan I ranga
- 1976: Strakh vysoty – professor Vladimir Dyagilyev
- 1977: Polkovnik v otstavke – Ivan Mikhaylovich
- 1977: Tsentrovoy iz podnebesya
- 1977: Printsessa na goroshine
- 1977: Blokada: Leningradskiy metronom, Operatsiya Iskra – von Leeb
- 1978: 31 June (31 июня) (TV Movie) – Meliot, king of Peradore / Mr. Dimmock, chief advertising agency
- 1979: Dobryaki
- 1980: Rafferty (Рафферти) (TV Movie) – US Senator Fellows
- 1981: Zhenshchina v belom – Frederic Fairlie
- 1983: A Mistery of Blackbirds – police commissioner
- 1984: Victory (Победа) – James F. Byrnes
- 1985: Pobeda – Birns
- 1987: And Then There Were None (Десять негритят) – Judge Lawrence Wargrave
- 1988: Zapretnaya zona
- 1989: Kanuvshee vremya
- 1991: Iskushenye B (Искушение Б) – the Duke
- 1997: Dandelion Wine (Вино из одуванчиков) – Mr. Spaulding
- 1998: Cops and Robbers (Полицейские и воры) – grandfather
- 1998: Classic – Vasya Rezanyj
- 2000: Zhenshchin obizhat ne rekomenduetsya – Idkind
- 2006: Park Sovetskogo perioda
- 2006: Andersen. Life Without Love (Андерсен. Жизнь без любви) – night watchman
- 2007: Karnavalnaya noch 2, ili 50 let spustya – Old clown
- 2007: Chertovo koleso
- 2007: Happy Together (Счастливы вместе) (TV Series) – collector
- 2010–2011: Svaty (Сваты) (TV Series) – Nikolai Nikolaevich
- 2015: Ubezhat, dognat, vluybitsya – (final film role)
