= Nikolai Kryuchkov =

Soviet actor (1911–1994)

- Николай Крючков
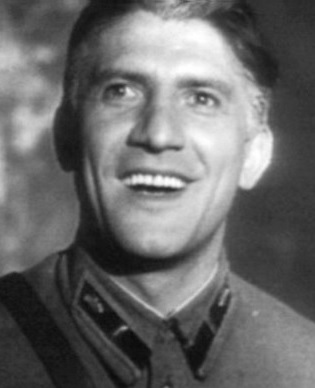
- Born: 6 January 1911 [O.S. 24 December 1910] Moscow, Russian Empire
- Died: 13 April 1994 (aged 83); Moscow, Russia
- Resting place: Novodevichy Cemetery
- Occupation: Actor
- Years active: 1927–1993

Nikolai Afanasyevich Kryuchkov (Note: Russian: Николай Афанасьевич Крючков, romanized: Nikolay Afanasyevich Kryuchkov) (6 January 1911 [O.S. 24 December 1910] – 13 April 1994) was a Soviet and Russian stage and film actor. He appeared in around 130 films between 1932 and 1993.

After the 1939 film Tractor Drivers, Kryuchkov became the most filmed actor in Soviet cinema. That role also won him a Stalin Prize, 1st class, in 1941. Later he gained even greater popularity thanks to the movies Lad from Our Town (1942) and Heavenly Slug (1945). A prolific actor, he could work in five films simultaneously and also played in theatre. He was named Merited Artist of the RSFSR in 1942, People's Artist of the RSFSR in 1950 and People's Artist of the USSR in 1965.

In 1991, he received a Nika Award for Lifetime Achievement, which is given by the Russian Academy of Cinema Arts and Science to one person per year.

Kryuchkov was awarded the Hero of Socialist Labor title (1980) and two Orders of Lenin (1940, 1980).

== Biography ==
Nikolai Kryuchkov was born to a working-class family in Moscow on December 24, 1910 (N. S. January 6, 1911).

At the age of 14, he entered the professional technical school at the Trekhgornaya textile factory. There, he studied to be an engraver, and it was there where he began playing in amateur theatre.

In 1928–1930, he studied at the acting school at the Moscow Central Theater of Working Youth. He combined his studies with work at the Trekhgornaya textile factory. He made his theatrical debut in 1927 in the production of a play titled 1905. From 1928 to 1933, he performed as an actor at the Moscow Central Theater of Working Youth (abbr. TRAM; presently Lenkom). He studied acting under Nikolai Khmelyov, Ilya Sudakov and Igor Savchenko.

His film debut was the role of the shoemaker Senka in Boris Barnet's film Outskirts (1933).

Since 1934, he worked as an actor at the Mezhrabpomfilm film studio (since 1936 named Soyuzdetfilm, since 1948 known as the Gorky Film Studio).

When the Great Patriotic War began, he wanted to enlist in the army, but the military registration and enlistment office refused him, deeming that his country needed him more as an actor. He continued to act in films, including as military personnel. He also performed for soldiers at the frontline as part of so-called concert brigades.

In 1941–1945, he worked as an actor at the Mosfilm film studio and the Central United Film Studio (abbr. TsOKS; presently Kazakhfilm).

Since 1945, he worked as an actor at the Theatre Studio of Film Actors.

In 1953, he joined the Communist Party of the Soviet Union.

He was also a member of the Soviet Filmmakers' Union.

In 1987, he published a book titled What a Man Lives By.

In total, over the years, he acted in about 130 films.

He died on April 13, 1994, in Moscow and was buried at the Novodevichy Cemetery.

== Selected filmography ==
- Outskirts (1933)
- By the Bluest of Seas (1936)
- The Return of Maxim (1937)
- The Vyborg Side (1938, uncredited)
- The Man with the Gun (1938, uncredited)
- A Great Life (1939, uncredited)
- Tractor Drivers (1939)
- Member of the Government (1939)
- Salavat Yulayev (1940)
- In the Rear of the Enemy (1941)
- They Met in Moscow (1941)
- Lad from Our Town (1942)
- Heavenly Slug (1945)
- Happy Flight (1949)
- The Battle of Stalingrad (1949)
- The Lights of Baku (1950)
- Sporting Honour (1951)
- Bountiful Summer (1951)
- The Star (1949, released 1953)
- In the Name of the Fatherland (1943, released 1954)
- Ernst Thälmann – Führer seiner Klasse (1955)
- The Forty-First (1956)
- Leningrad Symphony (1957)
- Over Tissa (1958)
- Ballad of a Soldier (1959)
- Cruelty (1959)
- Hussar Ballad (1962)
- A Day of Happiness (1963)
- Balzaminov's Marriage (1964)
- Come Here, Mukhtar! (1965)
- There Was an Old Couple (1965)
- Give Me a Book of Complaints (1965)
- Two Comrades Were Serving (1968)
- Telegram (1971)
- Town People (1975)
- Autumn Marathon (1979)
- Particularly Important Task (1980)
- Gypsy Happiness (1981)
- Ladies' Tango (1983)
- Battle of Moscow (1985)
- Stalingrad (1989)

== Awards and honors ==
- Three Orders of the Red Banner of Labour (1939, 1967, 1971)
- Two Orders of Lenin (1940, 1980)
- Stalin Prize, 1st class (1941)
- Honored Artist of the RSFSR (1942)
- Order of the Red Star (1944)
- People's Artist of the RSFSR (1950)
- People's Artist of the USSR (1965)
- Order of the October Revolution (1974)
- Hero of Socialist Labour (1980)
- Order of the Patriotic War, 1st class (1985)
- Nika Award for the Lifetime Achievement Award (1991)
