= Ivan Pyryev =

Soviet-Russian film director and screenwriter

- Иван Пырьев
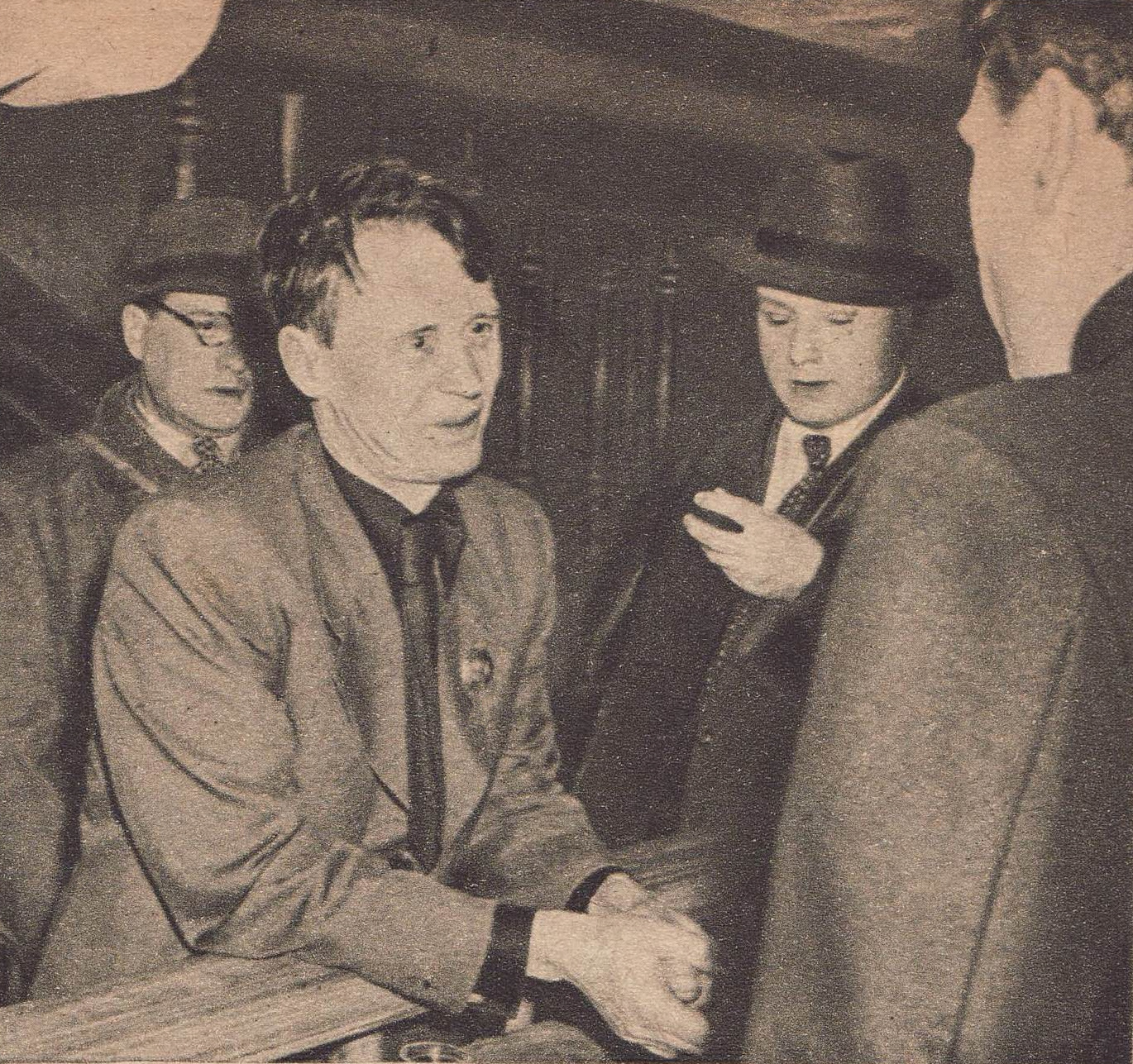
- Pyryev in 1947
- Born: Ivan Aleksandrovich Pyryev; 17 November 1901; Kamen, Tomsk Governorate, Russian Empire
- Died: 7 February 1968 (aged 66); Moscow, Russian SFSR, Soviet Union
- Resting place: Novodevichy Cemetery, Moscow
- Occupations: Film director, screenwriter, actor, pedagogue
- Years active: 1921–1968
- Spouse(s): Ada Voytsik; Marina Ladynina; Lionella Pyryeva
- Children: Erik Pyryev; Andrei Ladynin

Ivan Aleksandrovich Pyryev (Russian: Ива́н Алекса́ндрович Пы́рьев; 17 November [O.S. 4 November] 1901 – 7 February 1968) was a Soviet and Russian film director, screenwriter, actor and pedagogue remembered as the high priest of Stalinist cinema. He was awarded six Stalin Prizes (1941, 1942, 1946, 1946, 1948, 1951), served as Director of the Mosfilm studios (1954–57) and was, for a time, the most influential man in the Soviet motion picture industry.

== Life and career ==
Pyryev was born in Kamen, in the Tomsk Governorate of the Russian Empire (now Altai Krai, Russia). His early career included acting on stage directed by Vsevolod Meyerhold in The Forest («Лес») and by Sergei Eisenstein in the Proletcult Theatre production The Mexican. Pyryev also acted in Eisenstein's first short film Glumov's Diary. Pyryev's early career included production jobs behind the camera, such as work for director Yuri Tarich. He debuted as a director in the age of silent film, with Strange Woman (Посторонняя женщина, 1929).

During the 1930s and 1940s Pyryev rivaled Grigori Aleksandrov as the country's most successful director of musical comedies, all of which starred his wife Marina Ladynina. Even during wartime, when the Soviet film industry had been evacuated to Alma-Ata, Pyryev made popular and light-hearted features. In Six O'Clock after the War is Over the Romantic characters (played by Ladynina and Yevgeny Samoylov), when separated by war, arrange a date at 6 PM on the Victory Day, and the victory celebrations are shown towards the end of the film (which was released in November 1944).

Such films as They Met in Moscow (1941), Ballad of Siberia (1947) and Cossacks of the Kuban (1949) have often been broadcast on national television and proved effective in showcasing the idealized Soviet way of life. The former, shown in the US as They Met in Moscow, was the last film made in the Soviet Union before the German invasion. The protagonists, a Russian swineherd and a Chechen shepherd (played by Ladynina and Vladimir Zeldin) meet at the All-Union Agricultural Exhibition and fall in love with each other. The movie is noted for a memorable score by Isaak Dunayevsky and Tikhon Khrennikov. Cossacks of the Kuban, which launched the star of Klara Luchko, presents a highly glamorized picture of life in a southern kolkhoz.

Following Joseph Stalin's death, Pyryev turned his attention to adaptations. He produced two acclaimed adaptations of Fyodor Dostoevsky's novels, The Idiot (1958, starring Yury Yakovlev) and The Brothers Karamazov (1969), which was nominated for the Academy Award for Best Foreign Language Film and won him a Special Prize at the 6th Moscow International Film Festival. Pyryev died at the age of 66 in Moscow. Since The Brothers Karamazov was unfinished at the time, the film stars Kirill Lavrov and Mikhail Ulyanov are usually credited with having brought the project to a conclusion. His widow Lionella Pyryeva, who took the part of Grushenka in The Brothers Karamazov, went on to marry Oleg Strizhenov.

== Praise ==
Grigori Roshal wrote that "Pyriev's comedies speak of man's right to happiness, the attainment of which, in his native country, is not hindered by any national or class distinctions."

== Filmography ==
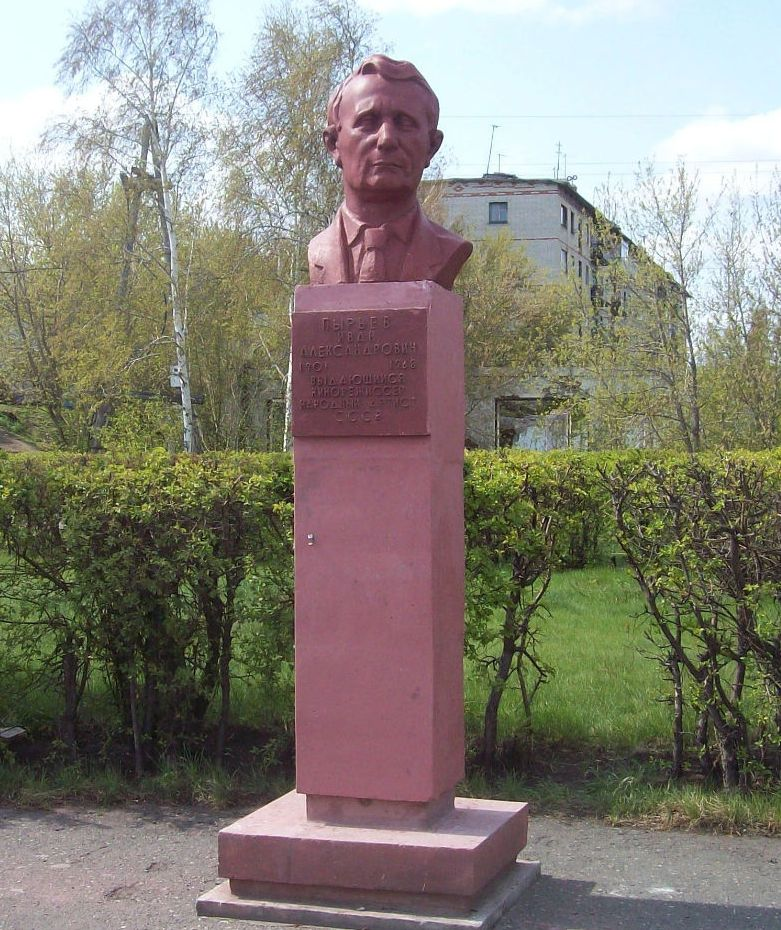
The bust of Pyryev, on the bank of the Ob River in Kamen-na-Obi

- 1929 – The Foreign Woman (Посторонняя женщина)
- 1931 – The Civil Servant (Государственный чиновник)
- 1933 – The Conveyor of Death (Конвейер смерти)
- 1936 – Party Membership Card (Партийный билет)
- 1937 – The Rich Bride (Богатая невеста)
- 1939 – Tractor Drivers (Трактористы) – Stalin Prize first degree (1941)
- 1940 – The Beloved (Любимая девушка)
- 1941 – They Met in Moscow (Свинарка и пастух) – Stalin Prize second degree (1942)
- 1942 – The District Secretary (Секретарь райкома) – Stalin Prize second degree (1943)
- 1944 – Six P.M. (В 6 часов вечера после войны) – Stalin Prize second degree (1946)
- 1948 – Ballad of Siberia (Сказание о земле Сибирской) – Stalin Prize first degree (1948)
- 1950 – Cossacks of the Kuban (Кубанские казаки) – Stalin Prize second degree (1951)
- 1952 – We are for Peace! (Мы - за мир / Freundschaft siegt)
- 1954 – Devotion (Испытание верности)
- 1958 – The Idiot (Идиот)
- 1959 – White Nights (Белые ночи)
- 1961 – Our Common Friend (Наш общий друг)
- 1964 – The Light of a Distant Star (Свет далекой звезды)
- 1969 – The Brothers Karamazov (Братья Карамазовы)

== See also ==
- Vsevolod Meyerhold State Theatre
