= Alyosha Monument =

Alyosha Monument may refer to:

- Alyosha Monument, Murmansk, Russia
- Alyosha Monument, Plovdiv, Bulgaria
- Bronze Soldier of Tallinn, Estonia

== See also ==
- "Alyosha" (song), a song inspired by the Plovdiv monument
