= Konstantin Vanshenkin =

Russian lyricist (1925–2012)

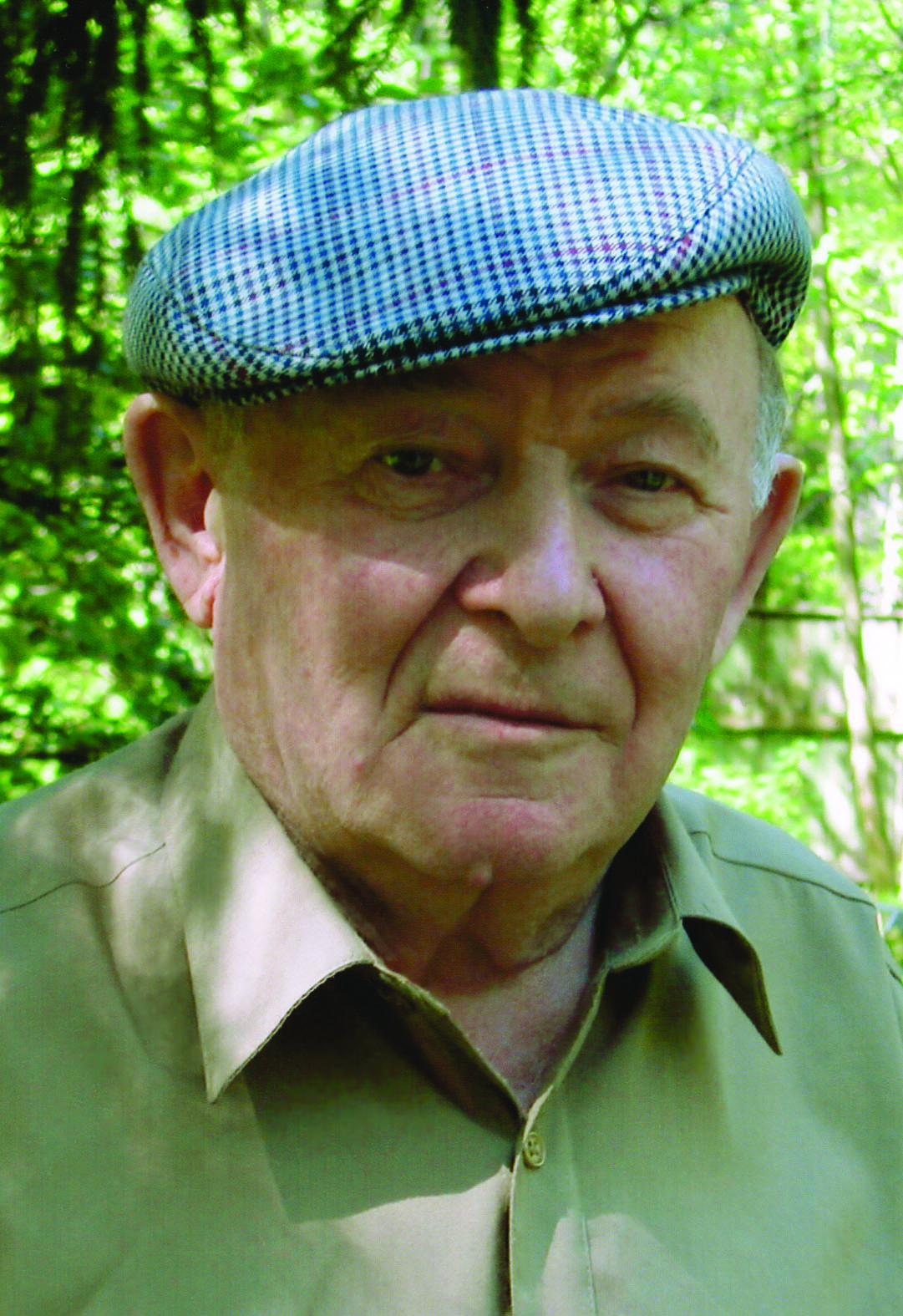
- Vanshenkin in 2003
- Born: Konstantin Yakovlevich Vanshenkin; 17 December 1925; Moscow, Soviet Union
- Died: 15 December 2012 (aged 86); Moscow, Russia
- Occupations: Poet, lyricist

Konstantin Yakovlevich Vanshenkin (Russian: Константин Яковлевич Ваншенкин; 17 December 1925 – 15 December 2012; born Konstantin Weinschenker) was a Soviet poet and lyricist from Moscow.

During the Second World War Vanshenkin served in the Soviet Army at the Airborne Forces of the 2nd Ukrainian Front and the 3rd Ukrainian Front. He was enlisted in 1942 and discharged at 1946. Song about the Guards, his first collection of poetry, was published in 1951. His best known songs are "Alyosha" (1966), inspired by a military memorial in Plovdiv, and "Ya lyublyu tebya zhizn" (1956), a signature song of Mark Bernes. A collection of his songs with music was published in 1965.

Vanshenkin was a recipient of prestigious state awards, including the USSR State Prize (1985) and the State Prize of the Russian Federation (2001).

His wife Inna Goff (1928–1991) was a notable lyricist in her own right. The spouses are buried at the Vagankovo Cemetery.
