= Enemies Burnt the Dear House Down =

Russian song

"Enemies Burnt the Dear House Down" (Russian: Враги сожгли родную хату, romanized: Vragi sozhgli rodnuyu khatu) is a famous Russian song associated with the Great Patriotic War, based on a poem by Mikhail Isakovsky (1946). It depicts losses and sufferings of the war generation and devastation of the country during Nazi occupation.

== History ==
Originally, the poem was written by Mikhail Isakovsky and published in a popular literature journal Znamya (1946, no.7). Impressed by the poems' lyrical strength, a distinguished poet and influential public person Aleksandr Tvardovsky advised composer Matvey Blanter to write music. Initially, Isakovsky was sceptical, but Blanter soon composed music that Isakovsky liked. The song was broadcast in the same year, performed by Vladimir Nechaev. However, some higher officials considered it too tragic and pessimistic and therefore forbade its public performances and broadcasting. People continued to perform the poem as a song on their own tune.

In 1960, a famous singer Mark Bernes dared to perform it publicly at a concert in Moscow. The performance was met with a standing ovation. In 1965 it was performed on musical variety show "Goluboj Ogonyok" by a personal request of Marshal Vasily Chuikov. After that, it became extremely popular in the USSR. Listeners confessed in their letter to the broadcasting stations that song told them about their own traumatic returns to their destroyed houses and burnt settlements. As a contemporary researcher of that period of Soviet culture writes, "That a song so honest about death, grief, loneliness, and shattered hopes could be created, published (in Znamia in 1946), performed, and broadcast at all, in poem form or in song, speaks to the confidence that the wartime public expressions of the emotional costs of war could continue; the state's reaction shows that such confidence was not completely justified".

The song could be perceived also had a hidden but recognizable opposition to the very idea of world revolution promoted by the official state ideology, on behalf of appreciation of private life.

The song is highly regarded in Russia. It is acknowledged as an iconic description of the great losses and incredible personal tragedies of the World War Two. During the war, great territories were occupied by Nazis and eventually retaken by the Soviet Red army. The war caused enormous human losses and total destruction of thousands of towns and other settlements.

== The plot ==
The poem has a typical ballad form. Its narration is not complicated. A demobilized soldier returns, allegedly very soon after the end of the Great Patriotic War, to his home village but discovers that his home was burnt down and all his family was killed. He has no place to go. He drifts somewhere to a crossing of two roads and finds a place that resembles a grave (or is an actual grave) and stops there. He talks to his wife Praskovya ( an old and typically 'peasant' Russian female name ) confessing in his dreams about how happy they would meet after the war and about their mutual love. He had been desperately fighting for four years and conquered three countries coming back to her, but they would never meet again. The soldier takes a bottle of alcohol out of his sack and drinks it, crying for his great losses and mourning the dreams of peaceful life after the war (symbolized by his dream of a feast with friends). He drinks and cries of despair. In the last line it is mentioned that the soldier is decorated with Medal "For the Capture of Budapest", which was given for participation in a notoriously fierce fighting during the war.

Although many singers produced their versions, the original version of Mark Bernes became a standard. Another popular version was recorded by Mikhail Pugovkin. This song is an iconic musical representation of Soviet culture and Soviet memoirs of the Great Patriotic War. There are numerous reference to the song in Russian literature, movies, personal stories etc.

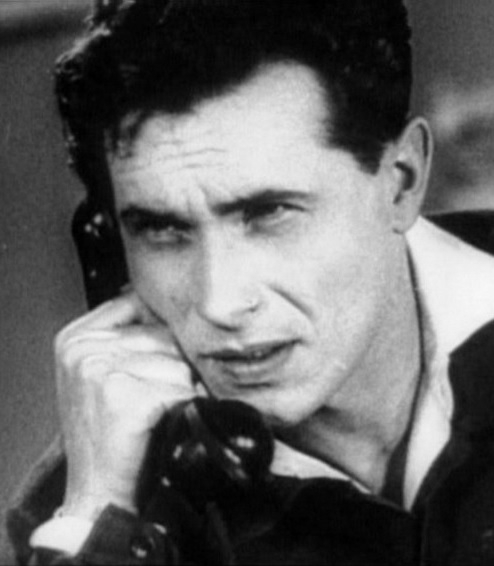
Singer and actor Mark Bernes in 1937.

=== The title of the song ===
Isakovsky's poem was entitled "Praskovya". However, when song gained its popularity, its first line was usually used to name the song. This line contains distinctively Ukrainian word for "village house": хата, khata. For a native Russian speaker, this usage unambiguously implied that the events of the song happened in Ukraine, which was totally occupied by Nazi Germany between 1941 and 1943. Alternatively, the song could have taken place in Southern Russia, whose population has mixed Russian and Ukrainian roots. There is no common English translation for this word.

Alternative translations of the title include "The Nazis burnt his home to ashes" and "Enemies burned the native hut."

== See also ==
- Dark Is the Night
- Zhuravli
