= The Civil Servant =

1931 film

- Russian: Государственный чиновник
- Directed by: Ivan Pyryev
- Written by: Vsevolod Pavlovskiy
- Starring: Maksim Shtraukh; Lidiya Nenasheva; Naum Rogozhin; Leonid Yurenev; Aleksandr Antonov; Ivan Bobrov
- Cinematography: Anatoliy Solodkov
- Release date: 1931
- Running time: 71 minute
- Country: Soviet Union
- Language: Russian

The Civil Servant (Russian: Государственный чиновник) is a 1931 Soviet film directed by Ivan Pyryev.

== Plot ==
The film tells the story of Apollon Fokin, a cashier working on the board of a railway company in the late 1920s. He diligently follows his work routine, remaining indifferent to the requests of visitors. Fokin becomes the target of a subversive group operating within the office, led by a group leader who orchestrates a robbery. Fokin resists, and during the chaos, a satchel with money unexpectedly ends up under the stairs, where it is found by his wife. With her help, Fokin seizes the opportunity to take the money for himself while maintaining his appearance as an honest man.

Despite this, the same thief later appears at Fokin’s apartment, leading to another confrontation. The robber is apprehended, and the stolen money is returned to the railway office. Fokin is celebrated by his colleagues as a hero. However, during the investigation, the thief exposes not only the members of the subversive group but also Fokin's role in the crime. Fokin, who had hoped to be elected to the Moscow Soviet for his "heroic deeds," finds himself facing trial instead.

== Cast ==
- Maksim Shtraukh as Apollon Fokin
- Lidiya Nenasheva as Fokina
- Naum Rogozhin as Razverzayev
- Leonid Yurenev as Fon Mekk
- Aleksandr Antonov as Chairman
- Ivan Bobrov as Russian
- Tatyana Barysheva as Nun
- Natalya Vasilyeva
