= Die Ostsee muss ein Meer des Friedens sein =

Political slogan

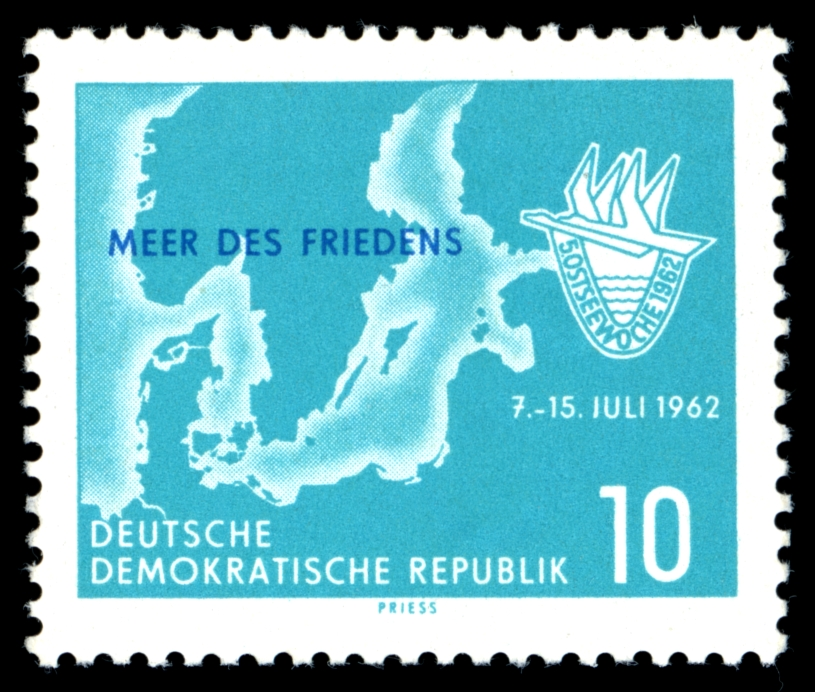
Stamp of East Germany (1962)

The Baltic Sea must be a sea of peace (German: Die Ostsee muss ein Meer des Friedens sein; Russian: Балтийское море должно быть морем мира) is a political slogan and a recurring motto, it was particularly used in the German Democratic Republic (GDR) and is refreshed in modern times by the peace movements. It expressed the desire for peaceful coexistence and cooperation among the Baltic Sea littoral states and was of particular importance in the context of the Cold War.

== Introduction ==
The slogan was employed in the GDR as part of foreign policy and propaganda. On the one hand, it was intended to convey a positive image of the GDR abroad; on the other, it emphasized the principle of peaceful coexistence of peoples. The motto was especially prominent during the annually held Ostseewoche (de) (Baltic Sea Week') (1958–1975). This international festival week included cultural and sporting events and also served as a platform for meetings between enterprises and cooperatives of the Baltic Sea countries. The slogan was also used at Workers' Conferences of the Baltic Sea Countries.

The motto remains relevant today, as the Baltic Sea continues to be an area affected by geopolitical tensions and military activities. In contemporary discussions, it is sometimes suggested that the Baltic Sea should once again become a space for cooperation and peaceful coexistence rather than confrontation.

An LP entitled Die Ostsee muss ein Meer des Friedens sein! was released in 1983 by the song group "Neue Horizonte", a GDR ensemble from the Volkstheater Rostock (Rostock People's Theatre) focusing on songs with themes of peace and youth from the Baltic countries. Published by the Free German Trade Union Federation (FDGB) on the occasion of a Workers' Conference within the framework of the Ostseewoche, the record also included workers' songs and political songs. Among them was the piece Meinst du, die Russen wollen Krieg? (Do the Russians Want War?), based on the text by Yevgeny Yevtushenko.

Advertising posters of the Bundeswehr in Rostock were at times overpasted with the slogan "Die Ostsee muss ein Meer des Friedens sein". Since 2024, the headquarters of the Commander Task Force Baltic (CTFB), established by NATO, has been located in Rostock. The staff is stationed on the grounds of the Hanse-Kaserne in Kopernikusstraße, which also houses the Navy Command, directly opposite the Ostseestadion.

In protest against the transport of nearly 200 Bundeswehr armored vehicles via the port of Rostock, the Friedensbündnis Norddeutschland (North German Peace Alliance) issued a call under the motto "Die Ostsee soll ein Meer des Friedens sein" (The Baltic Sea must be a sea of peace).

== See also ==
- Ostseewoche (in German)

== Literature ==
- Michael F. Scholz: Die Ostsee muss ein Meer des Friedens sein : die Rostocker Ostseewochen in der Aussenpolitik der DDR (1958 - 1975). Greifswald, Univ., Diss. A, 1990. (Table of contents)
- Gerhard Reintanz: Ostsee – Meer des Friedens, in the series Hefte aus Burgscheidungen No. 43. Berlin 1960.
- Göran Swistek, Michael Paul: Geopolitics in the Baltic Sea Region: Zeitenwende, maritime infrastructure, escalation risks, and Germany’s leadership ambitions. Stiftung Wissenschaft und Politik, 2023.
