= Boris Tenin =

Boris Tenin PAU
- Борис Тенин
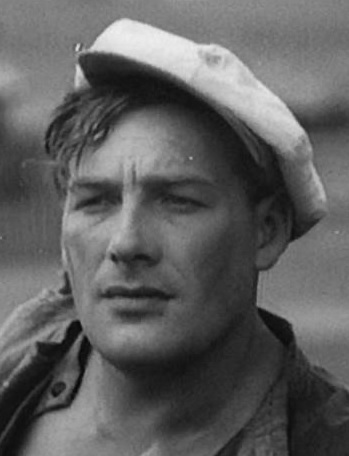
- Tenin in 1935
- Born: Boris Mikhailovich Tenin; 23 March 1905; Kuznetsk, Saratov Governorate, Russian Empire
- Died: 8 September 1990 (aged 85); Moscow, Soviet Union
- Occupations: Actor, theater pedagogue
- Years active: 1922–1990
- Spouse: Lidiya Sukharevskaya

Boris Mikhailovich Tenin (Russian: Бори́с Миха́йлович Те́нин; 23 March 1905 – 8 September 1990) was a Soviet and Russian stage and film actor and pedagogue. People's Artist of the USSR (1981).

== Biography ==
Boris Tenin was born in Kuznetsk in a family of a railroad telegraphist.

He was married to Lidiya Sukharevskaya until his death in Moscow, 1990.

== Filmography ==
- Lace (1928) as Club manager
- Golden Mountains (1931) as Boris "Shaggy" the stoker
- Counterplan (1932) as Vasya
- Without a Dowry (1936) as Vasily Danilych Vozhevatov
- The Man with the Gun (1938) as Ivan Shadrin
- Yakov Sverdlov (1940) as Coupletist (uncredited)
- Hello Moscow! (1945) as Writer
- The Russian Question (1947) as Bob Murphy
- Alitet Leaves for the Hills (1949) as Charlie Thomson
- The Fall of Berlin (1949) as Vasily Chuikov
- Przhevalsky (1951) as cossack Yegorov
- The Great Warrior Skanderbeg (1953) as Din
- Least We Forget (1954) as Maryan Maksimovich
- Behind Show Windows (1955) as Yegor Petrovich Bozhko
- For the Power of the Soviets (1956) as Zhora Kolesnichuk

== Awards and honors ==
- Honored Artist of the RSFSR (1939)
- Two Orders of the Red Banner of Labour (1939, for his portrayal of Ivan Shadrin in The Man with the Gun; 1985)
- People's Artist of the Tajik SSR (1944)
- Medal "For the Defence of Leningrad" (1946)
- Medal "For Valiant Labour in the Great Patriotic War 1941–1945" (1946)
- Medal "In Commemoration of the 800th Anniversary of Moscow" (1948)
- Stalin Prize, 1st class (1948) for his portrayal of Bob Murphy in The Russian Question
- People's Artist of the RSFSR (1950)
- Medal "In Commemoration of the 250th Anniversary of Leningrad"
- Jubilee Medal "In Commemoration of the 100th Anniversary of the Birth of Vladimir Ilyich Lenin" (1970)
- Jubilee Medal "Thirty Years of Victory in the Great Patriotic War 1941–1945"
- People's Artist of the USSR (1981)
- Jubilee Medal "Forty Years of Victory in the Great Patriotic War 1941–1945"
- Medal "Veteran of Labour" (1985)
