= The Fighters (1939 film) =

- Russian: Истребители
- Directed by: Eduard Pentslin
- Written by: Fyodor Knorre
- Starring: Mark Bernes; Vasiliy Dashenko; Yevgeniya Golynchik
- Cinematography: Nikolai Topchiy
- Music by: Nikita Bogoslovskiy
- Release date: 1939
- Running time: 91 min.
- Country: Soviet Union
- Language: Russian

The Fighters (Russian: Истребители, romanized: Istrebiteli) is a 1939 Soviet war adventure film directed by Eduard Pentslin.

== Plot ==
Sergey, Nikolay and Varya went to school together. The guys have long competed with each other. After school, they entered different flight schools, but after graduation they ended up in the same military unit. Their commander, Major Tuchkov, deliberately gives them joint tasks, including testing a new device. During one of the flights, Sergei warns the train about an obstacle on the way, thereby preventing a crash.

== Starring ==
- Mark Bernes as Lieutenant Sergey Kozhukharov
- Vasiliy Dashenko as Lieutenant Nikolay Melnikov
- Yevgeniya Golynchik as Varya
- Alexey Zagorsky as Professor
- Boris Andreyev as Lieutenant Ptenchik
- Varvara Zhuravlyova as Tanya
- Pyotr Aleinikov as Lieutenant
- Vladimir Uralsky as Kozhuharov's father
- Fedor Seleznyov as Aviation technician Yashin
- Vyacheslav Gomolyaka as Commander
