= The Man with the Gun =

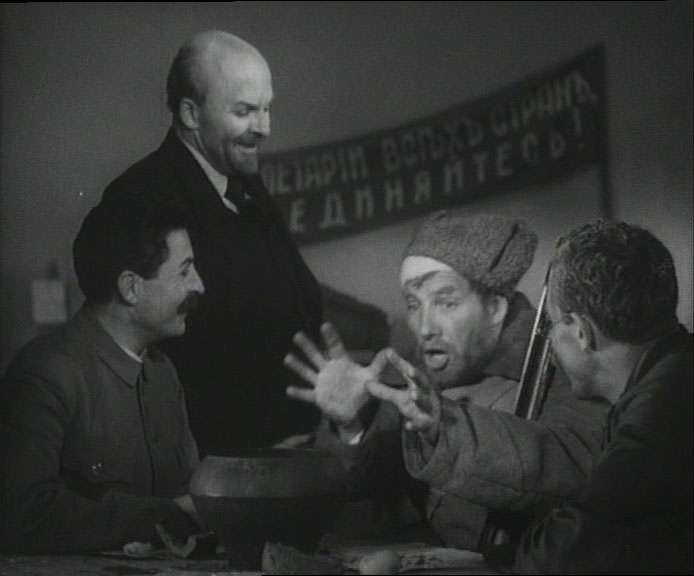
- Russian: Человек с ружьём
- Directed by: Sergei Yutkevich
- Written by: Nikolai Pogodin
- Starring: Maksim Shtraukh; Mikheil Gelovani; Boris Tenin; Zoya Fyodorova
- Music by: Dmitri Shostakovich
- Production company: Lenfilm
- Release date: 1938
- Country: Soviet Union
- Language: Russian

The Man with the Gun (Russian: Человек с ружьём, romanized: Chelovek s ruzhyom, lit. 'Person with a rifle') is a 1938 Soviet history drama film directed by Sergei Yutkevich.

The film takes place during the October Revolution, when the army is approaching the army of General Krasnov. Ivan Shadrin, a peasant who became a soldier, goes to Petrograd in order to convey a letter to Vladimir Lenin with questions that concern his comrades.

== Plot ==
The events of the film take place in Russia in 1917 during the October Revolution. The situation on the frontlines is dire, and the forces of General Pyotr Krasnov are advancing toward the capital. Ivan Shadrin, a former peasant and now a soldier, is sent by his comrades from the German front to revolutionary Petrograd to deliver a letter to Lenin containing their questions.

The central scene of the film is Shadrin's first meeting with Lenin. Wandering through the Smolny Institute with a rifle and a kettle in search of boiling water, Shadrin accidentally encounters a short man in a three-piece suit. The man takes time to listen to him, shows great interest in his needs, and answers all his questions. Unaware of the identity of his interlocutor, Shadrin later learns from a guard that he was speaking with Vladimir Lenin. Overcome with excitement, Shadrin exclaims, *"Comrades! I just talked to Lenin!"* After this, Shadrin returns to the front.

During a reconnaissance mission in Tsarskoye Selo, Shadrin nearly captures a White Army general but ultimately lets him escape. Later, during a chance encounter with Lenin and Stalin, Dymov recounts the episode, amusing the leaders. Shadrin is also present during this meeting, where Lenin and Stalin encourage him, saying, "Next time, a soldier won't hesitate before a general!"

Shadrin continues fighting on the frontlines to defend Petrograd. Upon his return to the city, he attends a speech by Lenin at the Putilov Factory.

== Cast ==
- Maksim Shtraukh as Vladimir Lenin
- Mikheil Gelovani as Joseph Stalin (removed from cut version)
- Boris Tenin as Ivan Shadrin
- Vladimir Lukin as Nikolai Chibisov
- Zoya Fyodorova as Katya
- Faina Ranevskaya as mansion owner, séance psychic (uncredited)
- Boris Chirkov as Yevtushenko
- Nikolay Cherkasov as general
- Nikolai Sosnin as Zakhar Zakharovich Sibirtsev, millionaire
- Serafima Birman as Varvara Ivanovna, his wife
- Mark Bernes as Kostya Zhigilyov
- Stepan Kayukov as Andrei Dymov, sailor
- Pavel Sukhanov as Matushkin, captive
- Konstantin Sorokin as honor guard
- Nikolai Kryuchkov as Sidorov
- Pavel Kadochnikov as soldier with seeds
- Mikhail Yanshin as officer, séance guest
- Yuri Tolubeyev as revolutionary sailor
- Pyotr Aleynikov as soldier
- Vladimir Volchik as soldier
- Yelizaveta Uvarova as freeloader
- Vasili Vanin as general's batman
