= Alyosha Monument, Plovdiv =

Statue in Plovdiv, Bulgaria

Coordinates: 42.143611°N 24.7375°E

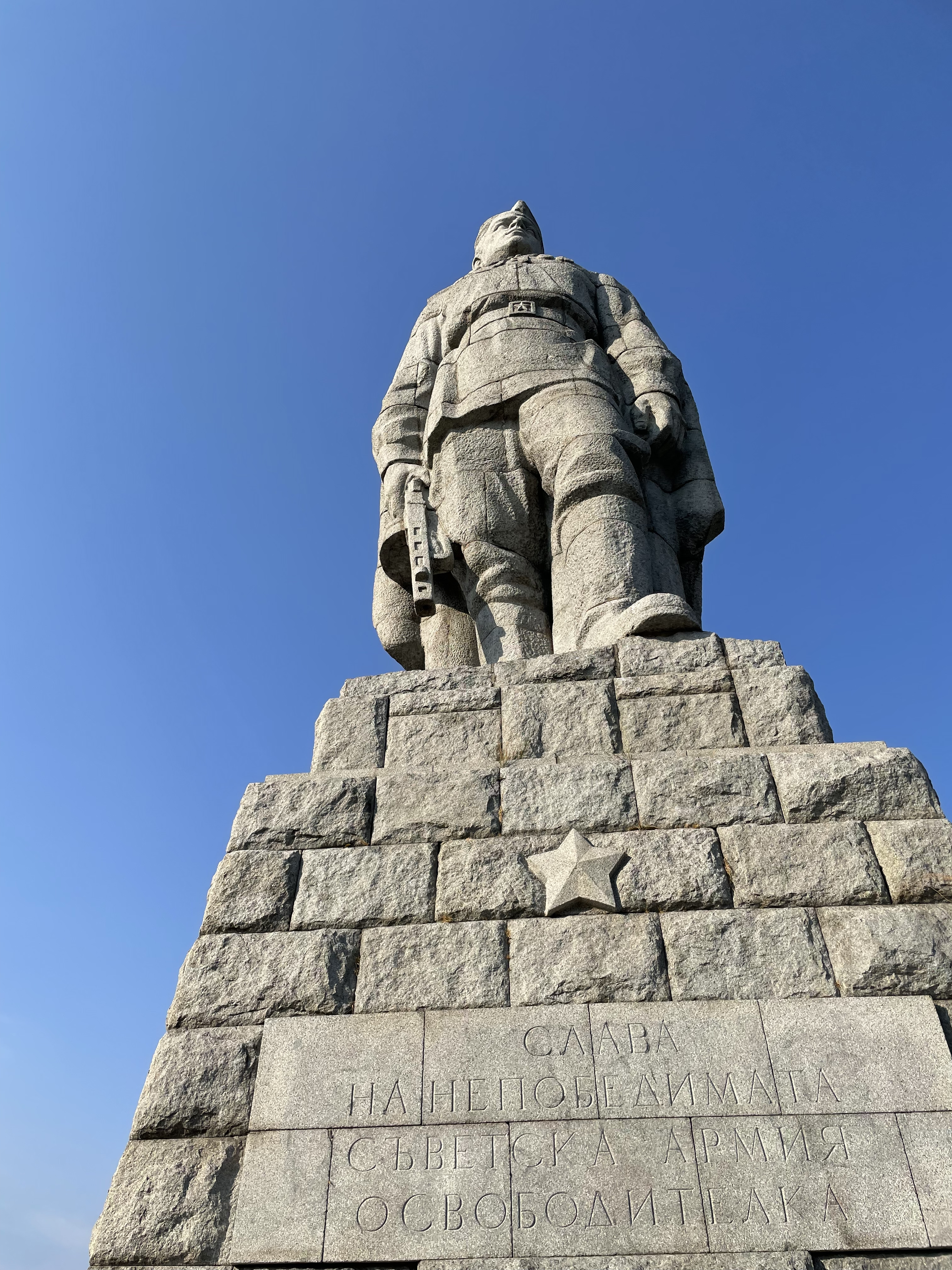
Alyosha Monument, Plovdiv

Alyosha (an affectionate diminutive of Aleksey) is an 11-metre (36-foot) tall reinforced concrete statue of a Soviet soldier on Bunarjik Hill in Plovdiv, Bulgaria. The statue tops a 6-metre (20-foot) pedestal lined with granite. The memorial commemorates Soviet casualties incurred during the Germany occupation of Bulgaria (which had been an Axis ally) in World War II. It was installed in 1954-57.

"Alyosha" is also the name of Konstantin Vanshenkin and Eduard Kolmanovski's song that was adopted as Plovdiv's official anthem until 1989. A well-known poem about the Plovdiv Soldier was written by Robert Rozhdestvensky.

Plovdiv authorities sought to have the statue removed on at least two occasions, in 1989 and 1996. The 1989 decision led to a preservation campaign which included a guard by the statue day and night in order to prevent it from being demolished.

Alyosha Skurlatov, a soldier of the 3rd Ukrainian Front who served as the model for this statue, died in 2013 at the age of 91.

== Notes ==
1. In fact, the Red Army did not fight an extensive campaign in Bulgaria. A new and Soviet-friendly government was established by the Bulgarians themselves almost immediately the Soviets crossed the Bulgarian border and the Red and Bulgarian Armies became allied. While there was scattered and bitter fighting, mostly between Bulgarians, German attempts to hold Bulgaria were relatively desultory and ineffectual and a large Soviet campaign in Bulgaria was not needed. See Bulgarian coup d'état of 1944 and Military history of Bulgaria during World War II.
