= Lenin in Poland =

1966 film

Lenin in Poland (Ленин в Польше)
- Film poster
- Directed by: Sergei Yutkevich; Jan Rutkiewicz
- Written by: Yevgeny Gabrilovich; Sergei Yutkevich
- Starring: Maksim Shtraukh
- Cinematography: Jan Laskowski
- Release date: 21 April 1966
- Running time: 98 minutes
- Country: Soviet Union
- Language: Russian

Lenin in Poland (Russian: Ленин в Польше, romanized: Lenin v Polshe) is a 1966 Soviet historical drama film directed by Sergei Yutkevich. Yutkevich won the award for Best Director at the 1966 Cannes Film Festival.

== Plot ==
The film is set in 1914 at the outset of World War I, focusing on Vladimir Lenin's time in exile in the village of Poronin, located in the Carpathian foothills on Polish lands within the Austro-Hungarian Empire. Lenin, along with Nadezhda Krupskaya and her mother, Elizaveta Vasilievna, had previously visited Poronin two years before the war. By the summer of 1914, they had returned, moving from nearby Kraków. This location was convenient due to its proximity to the border with the Russian Empire.

However, as tensions escalated, Lenin was suspected of espionage by the Austrian authorities. Eight days into the war, he was arrested as a subject of a hostile foreign power and imprisoned. Locals were so suspicious of Lenin that he faced threats of mob justice. Despite being ordered to report to the prison in Nowy Targ voluntarily, Lenin delayed his departure to send urgent telegrams to influential Austrian social democrats. Among these was Victor Adler, a parliament member who successfully lobbied for Lenin's release by persuading the Interior Minister that Lenin was a greater enemy of the Russian government than even the minister himself. On August 19, Lenin was freed and departed for Switzerland. The film portrays the events surrounding Lenin's arrest and the struggle for his release as a central storyline.

== Actual events ==
In the summers of 1913 and 1914 Vladimir Lenin and Nadezhda Krupskaya rented a holiday home in Biały Dunajec and often stayed in a nearby Poronin inn. The area formed part of Austria-Hungary at that time (as a result of the Partitions of Poland), and when World War I broke out in mid-1914 the Austrian authorities arrested Lenin on suspicion of spying for Russia (August 1914), but deported him to Switzerland soon after (September 1914), after Lenin's defenders convinced the authorities that Lenin was actually an enemy of the Russian government.

== Cast ==
- Maksim Shtraukh - Vladimir Lenin
- Anna Lisyanskaya - Nadezhda Krupskaya
- Antonina Pavlycheva - Krupskaya's mother
- Ilona Kusmierska - Ulka
- Edmund Fetting - Yakov Ganetsky
- Krzysztof Kalczynski - Andrzej
- Tadeusz Fijewski - Prison secretary
- Gustaw Lutkiewicz - Investigator
- Kazimierz Rudzki - Priest
- Zbigniew Skowronski - Wachtmeister Matyszczuk
- Jarema Stepowski - Photographer
