= Conspiracy of the Doomed =

1950 film

- Russian: Заговор обречённых
- Directed by: Mikhail Kalatozov
- Written by: Nikolai Virta
- Starring: Lyudmila Skopina; Pavel Kadochnikov; Vladimir Druzhnikov; Boris Sitko; Vsevolod Aksyonov
- Cinematography: Mark Magidson
- Edited by: G. Slavatinskaya
- Music by: Vissarion Shebalin
- Release date: 1950
- Country: Soviet Union

Conspiracy of the Doomed (Russian: Заговор обречённых, romanized: Zagovor obrechonnykh) is a 1950 Soviet drama film directed by Mikhail Kalatozov.

The film shows how a new state system in one country of Eastern Europe is being introduced, which causes discontent and resistance.

The film was actress Sofiya Pilyavskaya's debut.

== Plot ==
In an Eastern European country recently liberated by Soviet forces from fascism, a new conspiracy begins to take shape. The U.S. Ambassador, Mac-Hill, seeks to turn the independent state into the "49th state of America" and becomes the mastermind behind a group of conspirators. This cabal includes prominent figures such as Kristina Padera, the Minister of Food; Hugo Vastis, the Minister of Industry and leader of the Catholic Party; Joachim Pino, the head of Public Security and later the Parliament Speaker; Cardinal Birnch, an agent of the Vatican; and Kyra Rachel, a Chicago journalist serving imperialist interests. Together, they plot to destabilize the nation and undermine its sovereignty.

Mac-Hill and Padera orchestrate an economic blockade to create the illusion of a humanitarian crisis, blaming the Soviet Union for widespread hunger while disguising U.S. involvement as charitable aid. The plan involves secret negotiations with the Yugoslav government to intensify the blockade. Meanwhile, in a heated parliamentary session, a vote on the Marshall Plan divides the nation. Nationalists, the Catholic Party, and right-leaning Social Democrats support the plan, while Communists, agrarians, and left-wing Social Democrats rally against it, backed by a massive public demonstration that floods the square outside Parliament. With his plans unraveling, Mac-Hill attempts a military intervention, enlisting Tito's forces from Yugoslavia to lead a southern invasion with U.S. support.

Despite these efforts, the resistance, led by Communist Party activists like Nikola Slaveno, Hanna Lichta, and Max Venta, alongside left-wing Social Democrats and agrarian leaders such as Costa Varra, mobilizes workers, peasants, and partisans to quash the uprising. The coup is defeated, and the conspirators, including Cardinal Birnch and Kyra Rachel, are arrested, while Mac-Hill is expelled from the country. With the Communists firmly in power, a delegation travels to Moscow to sign a Treaty of Friendship and Mutual Assistance with the USSR, solidifying their alliance against imperialist threats. Addressing the nation, Slaveno declares, "Dear brothers and sisters, Generalissimo Stalin has helped us!" as the country looks eastward for its future security and prosperity.

== Cast ==
- Lyudmila Skopina as Ganna Likhta (as L. Skopina)
- Pavel Kadochnikov as Maks Venta (as P. Kadochnikov)
- Vladimir Druzhnikov as Mark Pino (as V. Druzhnikov)
- Boris Sitko as Kosta Varra (as B. Sitko)
- Vsevolod Aksyonov as Sloveno (as V. Aksyonov)
- Luiza Koshukova as Magda Forsgolm (as L. Koshukova)
- Lyudmila Vrublevskaya as Mina Varra (as L. Vrublyovskaya)
- Ivan Pelttser as Steban (as I. Pelttser)
- Ilya Sudakov as Ioakhim Pino (as I. Sudakov)
- Sofiya Pilyavskaya as Khristina Padera (as S. Pilyavskaya)
- Aleksandr Vertinskiy as Cardinal Birnch (as A. Vertinskiy)
- Maksim Shtraukh as Mak-Hill (as M. Shtraukh)
- Vladimir Maruta as Gugo Vastis (as V. Maruta)
- Oleg Zhakov as Kurtov (as O. Zhakov)
- Valentina Serova as Kira Reychel (as V. Serova)
- Rostislav Plyatt as Bravura (as R. Plyatt)
- Ivan Bobrov as Yassa (as I. Bobrov)
