= The Four Visits of Samuel Wolfe =

- Directed by: Aleksandr Stolper
- Release date: 1934
- Country: Soviet Union
- Language: Russian

The Four Visits of Samuel Wolfe (Russian: Четыре визита Самюэля Вульфа, romanized: Chetyre visita Samuelya Vulfa) is a 1934 Soviet drama film directed by Aleksandr Stolper.

== Plot ==
Not being able to realize his invention within his own country, engineer Arrowsmith, author of the patent for ore flotation leaves for Soviet Union to work at one of the flotation plants, where he soon discovers a group of Soviet engineers conduct similar work. After some hesitation, Arrowsmith passes his invention to the plant and gets an offer to work together on the implementation of the invention.

Samuel Wolfe arrives, a spokesman for the syndicate of flotation machines who previously declined assistance to Arrowsmith for implementing his invention at his plants, offers him to sell his invention with the promise of a good life. But now Dick Arrowsmith categorically rejects Wolfe's offer and stays to work in the USSR.

== Cast ==
- Andrei Abrikosov
- Viktor Kulakov
- Maksim Shtraukh

== Bibliography ==
- Rollberg, Peter. Historical Dictionary of Russian and Soviet Cinema. Scarecrow Press, 2008.
