= Cannes Film Festival Award for Best Director =

Award presented annually by the Cannes Film Festival

Best Director Award
- Prix de la mise en scène (French)
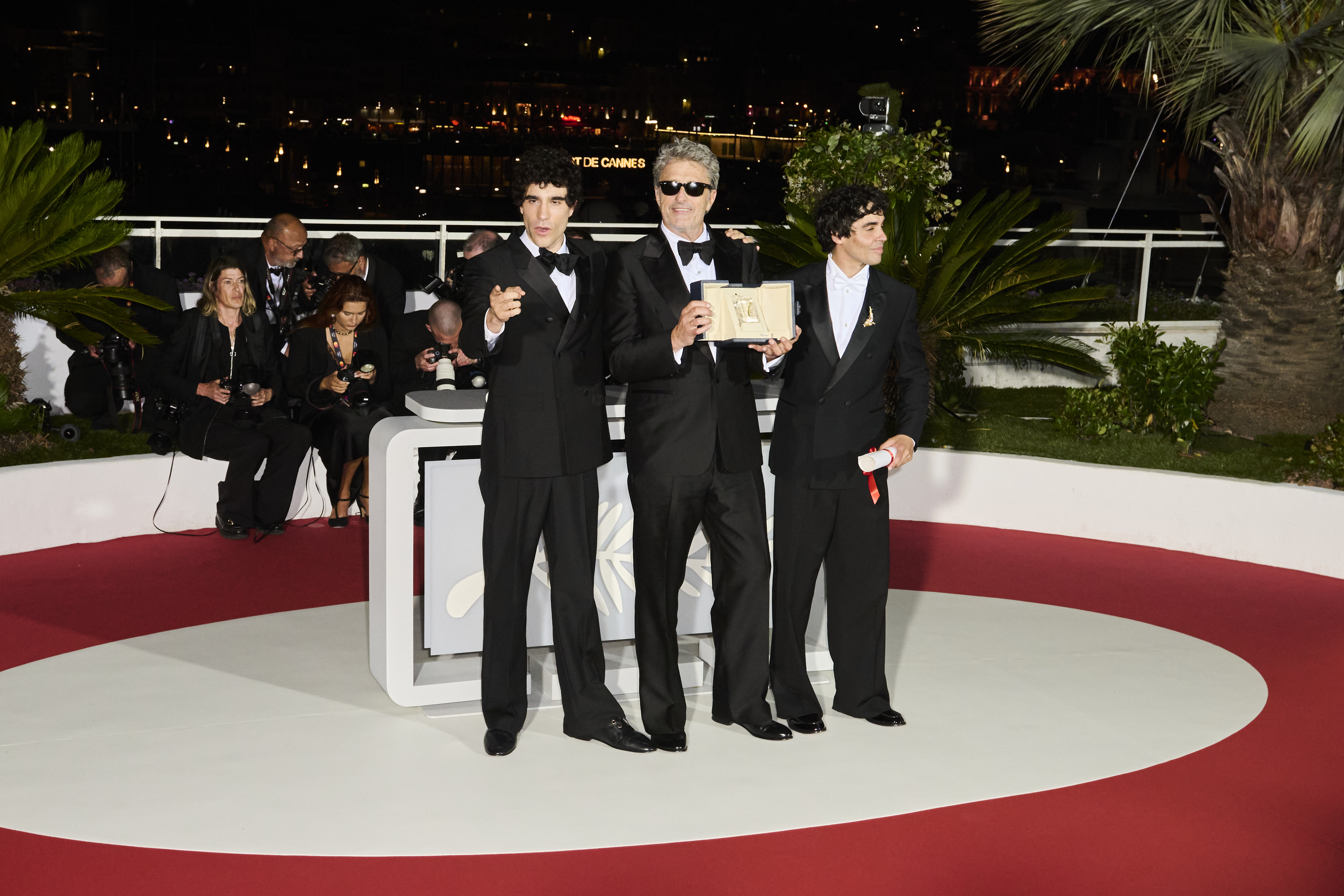
- 2026 recipients (left to right): Javier Calvo, Paweł Pawlikowski, and Javier Ambrossi
- Awarded for: Best Achievement in Direction
- Country: France
- Presented by: Cannes Film Festival
- First award: 1946
- Currently held by: Javier Ambrossi and Javier Calvo for La bola negra and Paweł Pawlikowski for Fatherland (2026)
- Website: www.festival-cannes.com/en/

The Best Director Award (French: Prix de la mise en scène) is an award presented annually at the Cannes Film Festival since 1946. It is given for the best achievement in directing and is chosen by the International Jury from the films in the Competition slate at the festival.

The most recent winners are Javier Ambrossi and Javier Calvo for La bola negra and Paweł Pawlikowski for Fatherland at the 2026 Cannes Film Festival.

== History ==
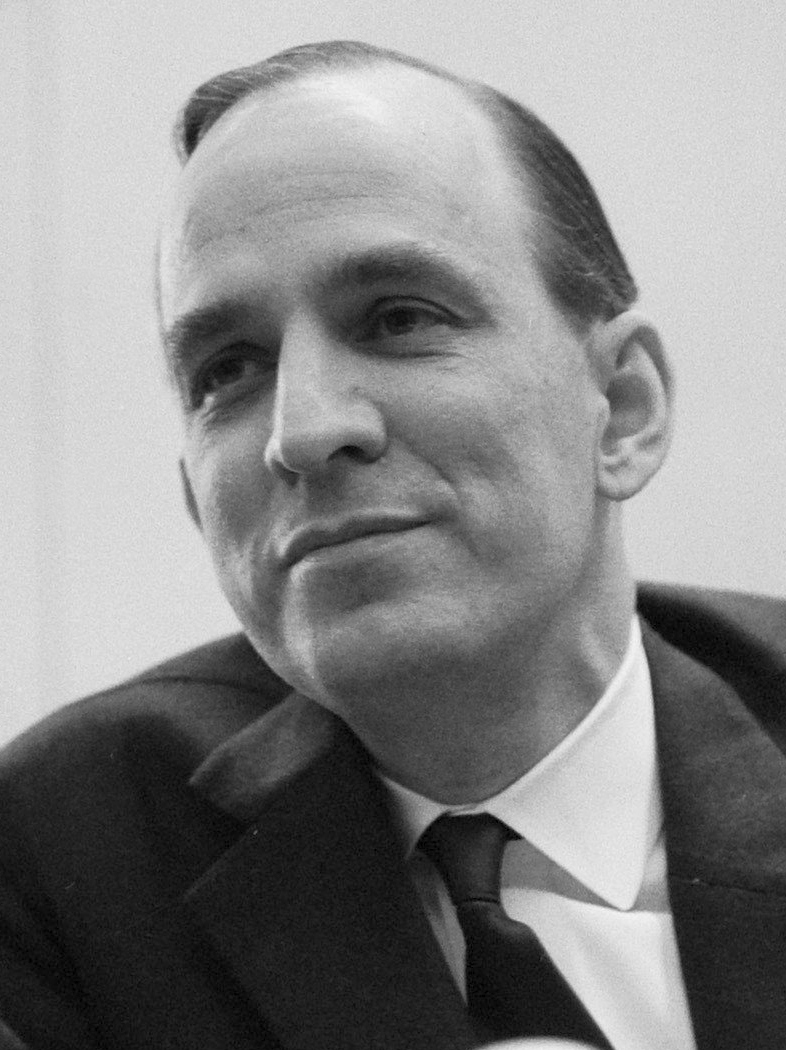
Ingmar Bergman won for Brink of Life (1958)

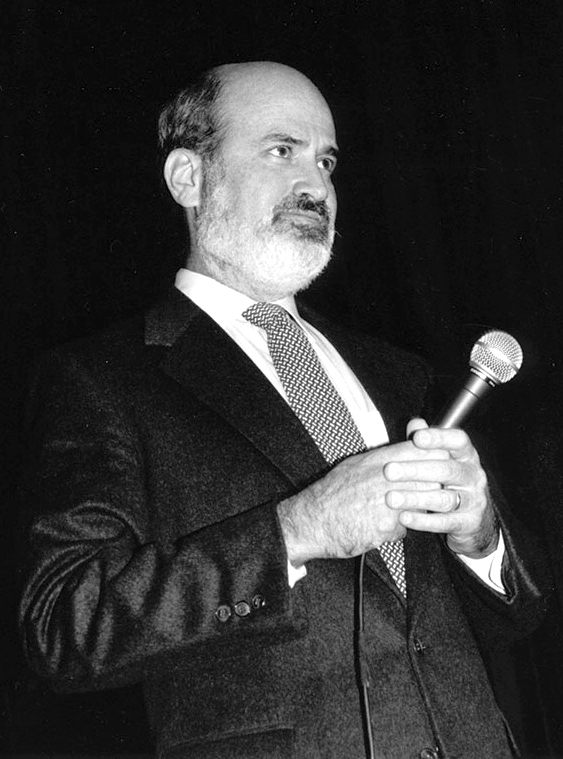
Terrence Malick won for Days of Heaven (1978)

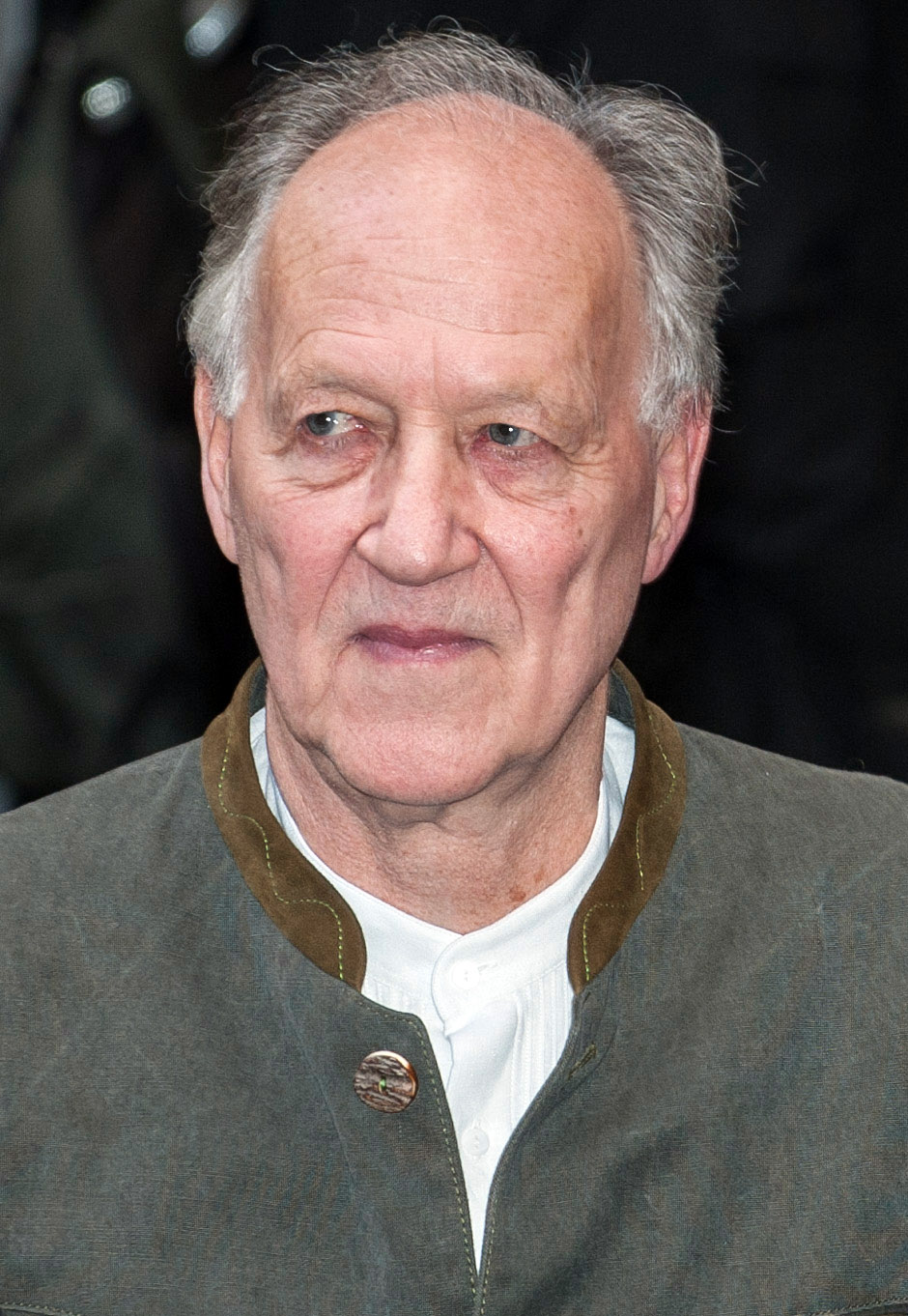
Werner Herzog won for Fitzcarraldo (1982)

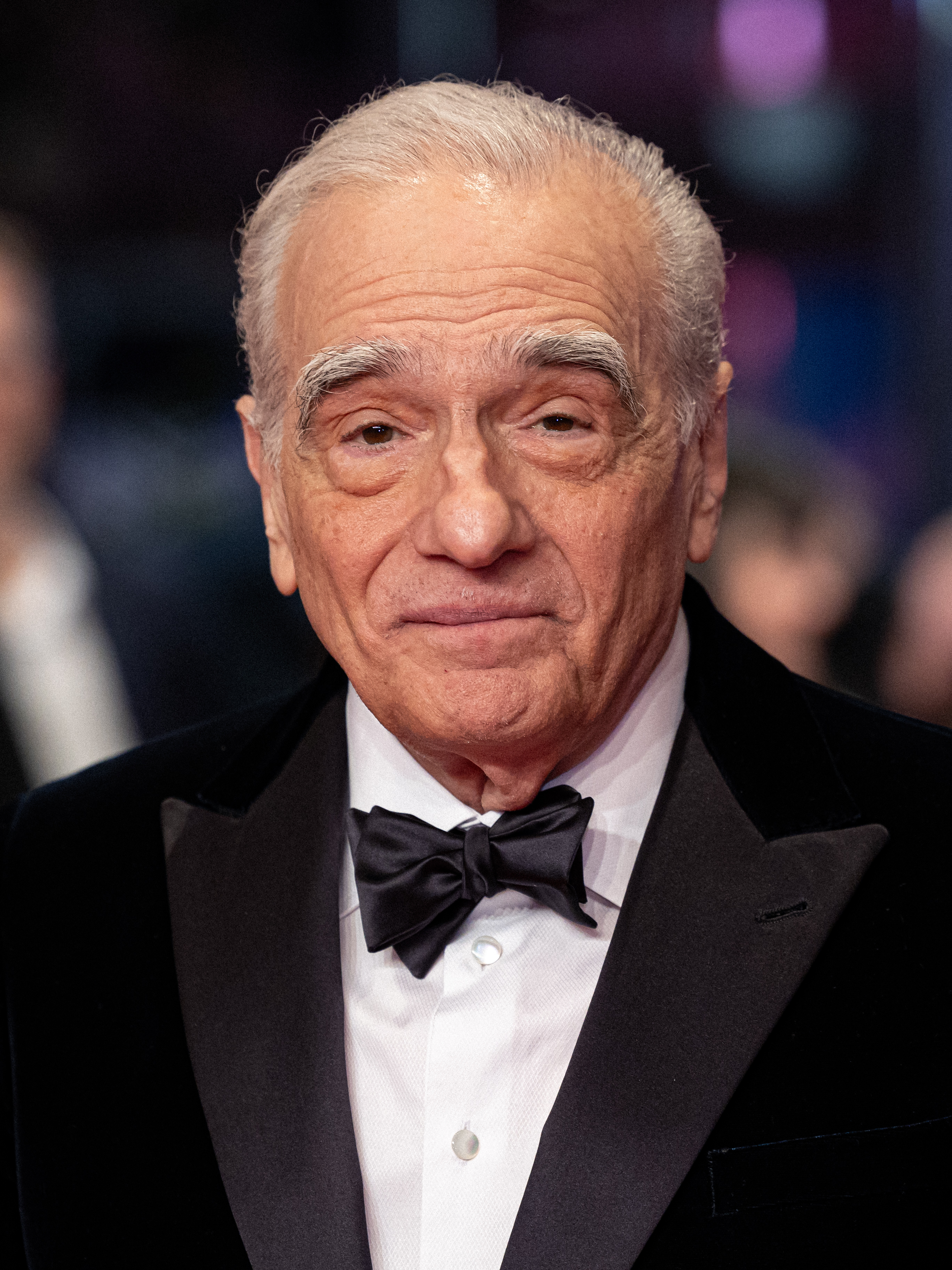
Martin Scorsese won for After Hours (1986)

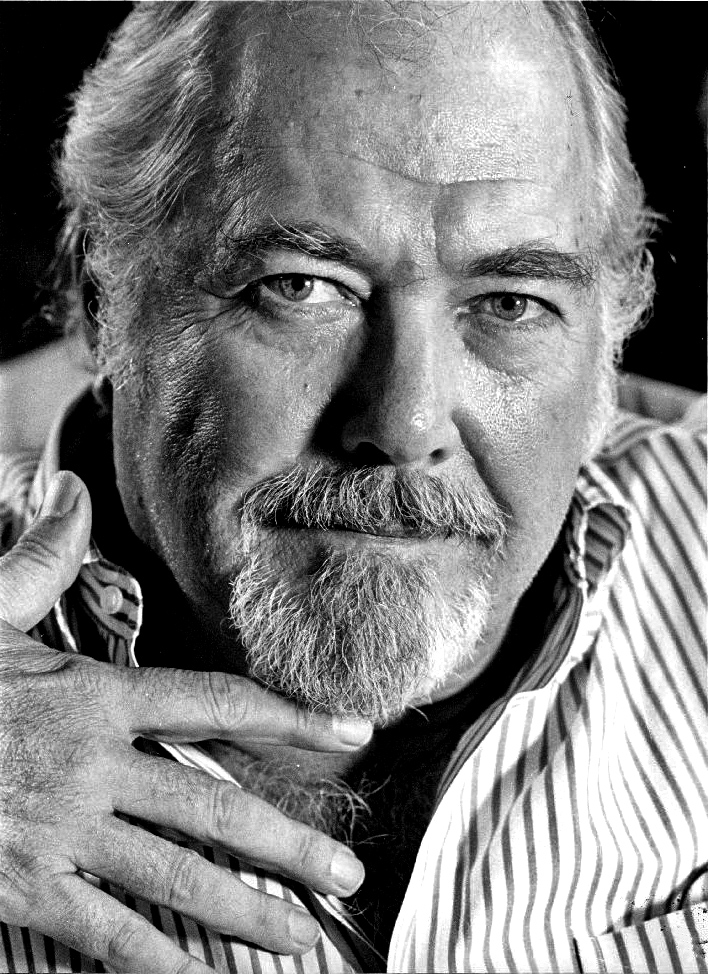
Robert Altman won for The Player (1992)

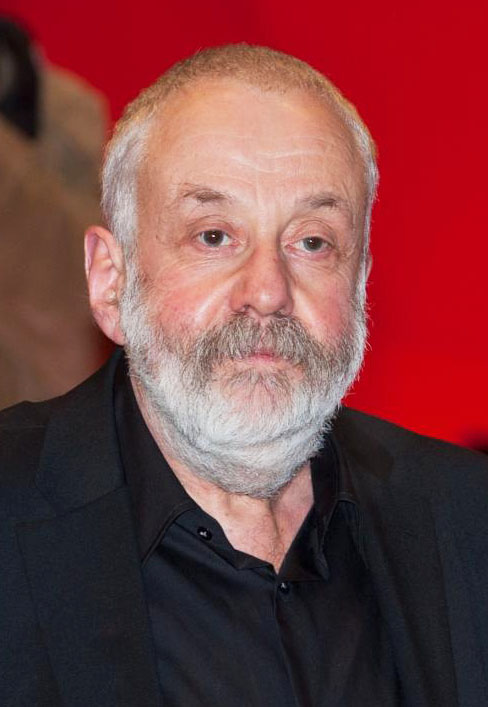
Mike Leigh won for Naked (1993)

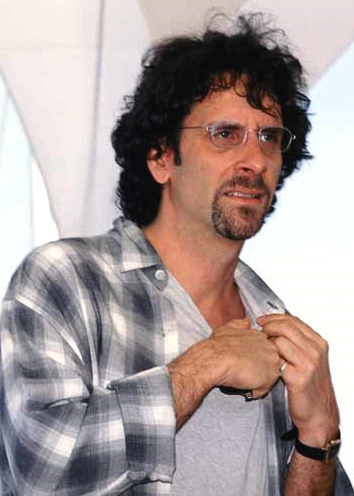
Joel Coen won for Barton Fink (1991), Fargo (1996), The Man Who Wasn't There (2001)

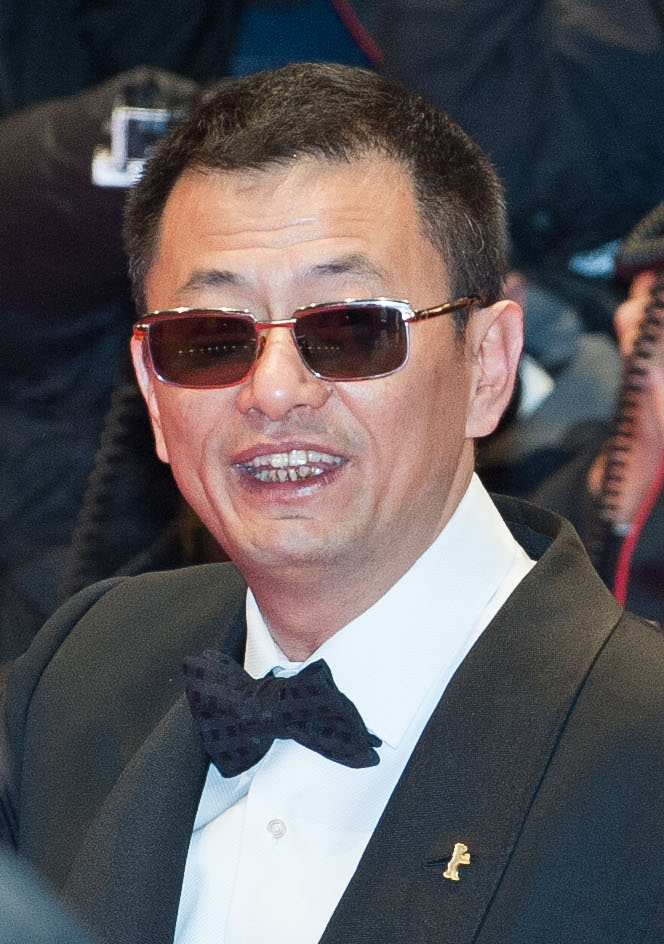
Wong Kar-wai won for Happy Together (1997)

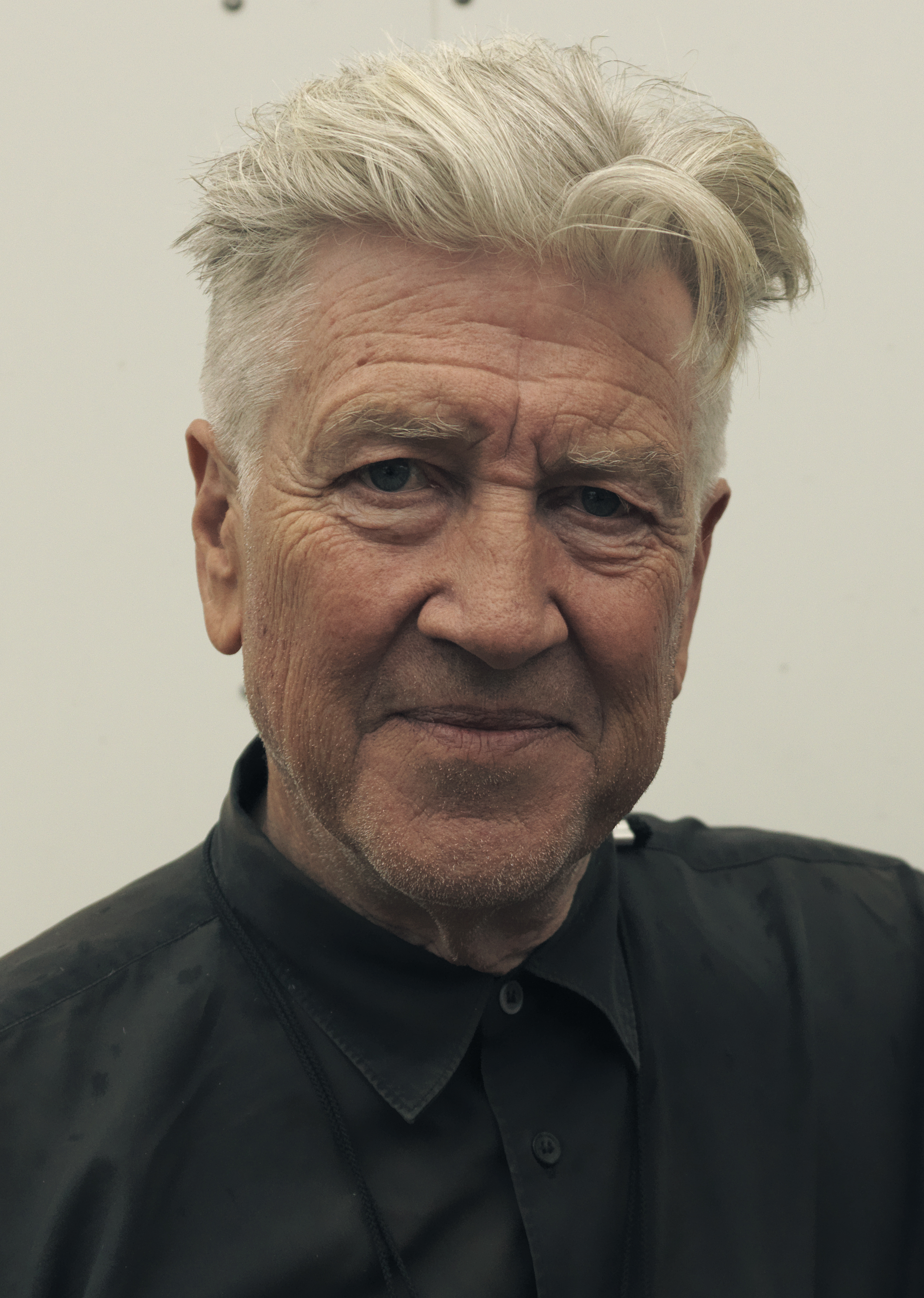
David Lynch won for Mulholland Drive (2001)

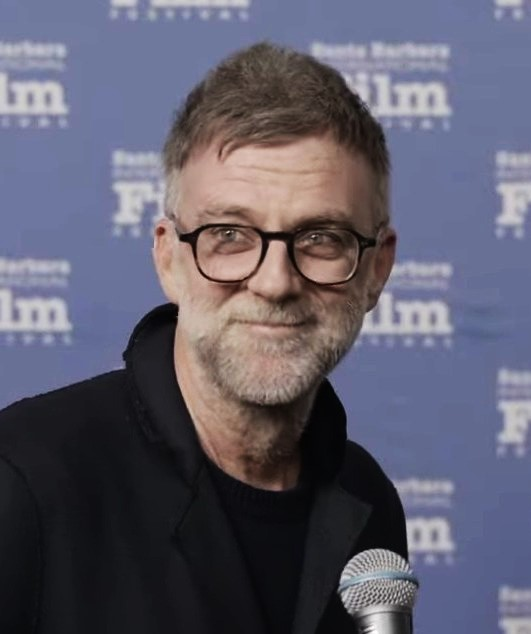
Paul Thomas Anderson won for Punch-Drunk Love (2002)

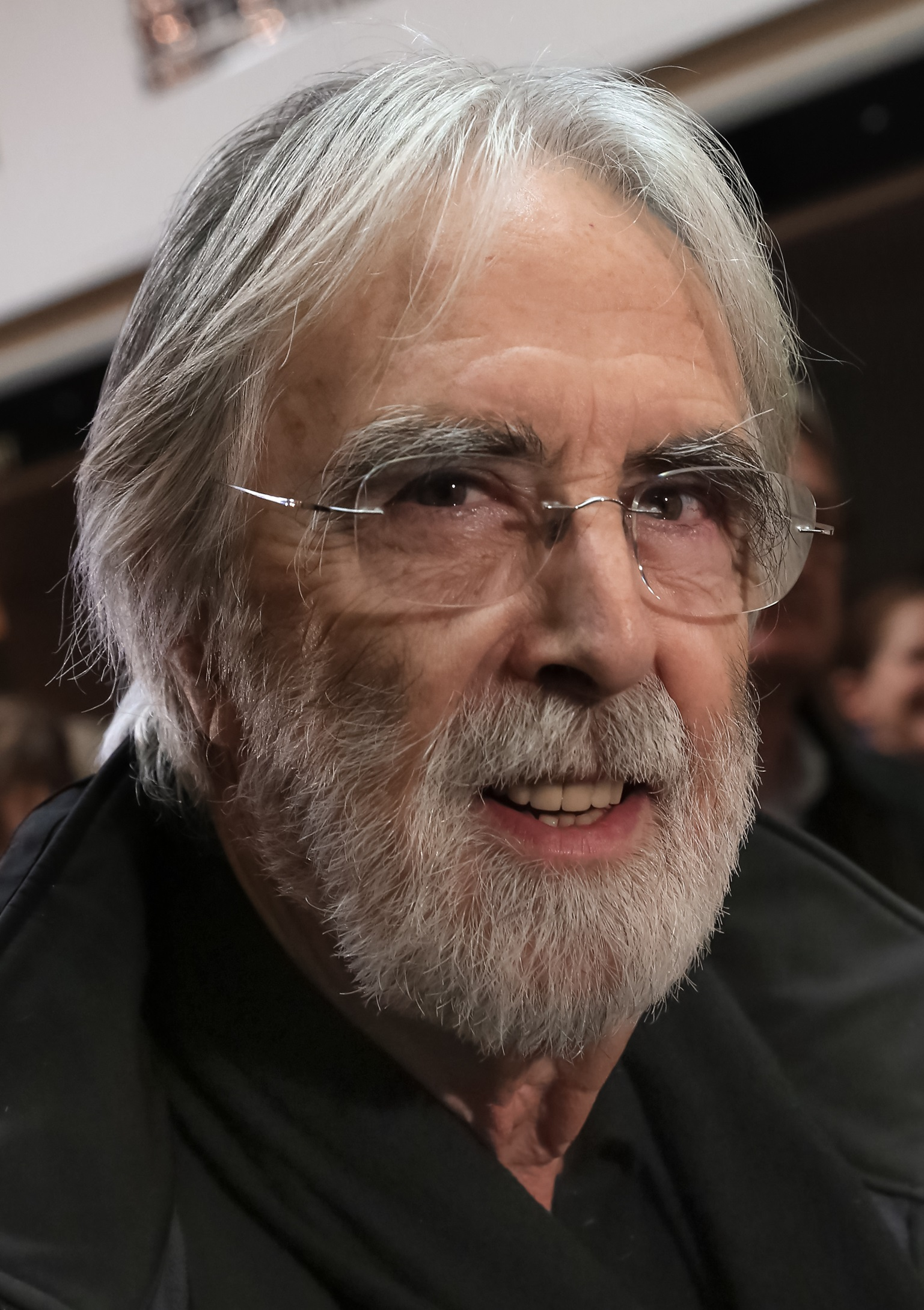
Michael Haneke won for Caché (2005)

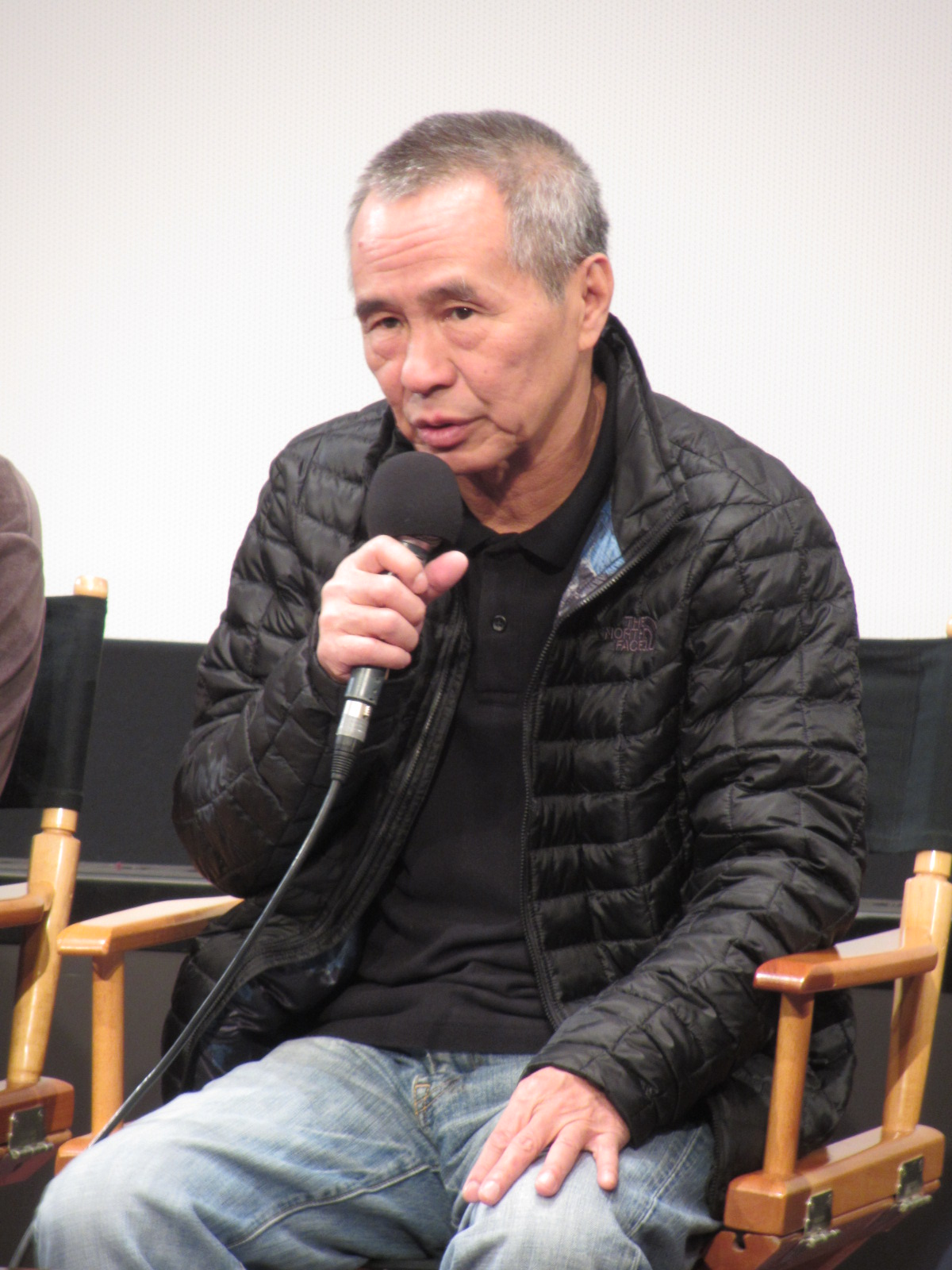
Hou Hsiao-hsien won for The Assassin (2015)

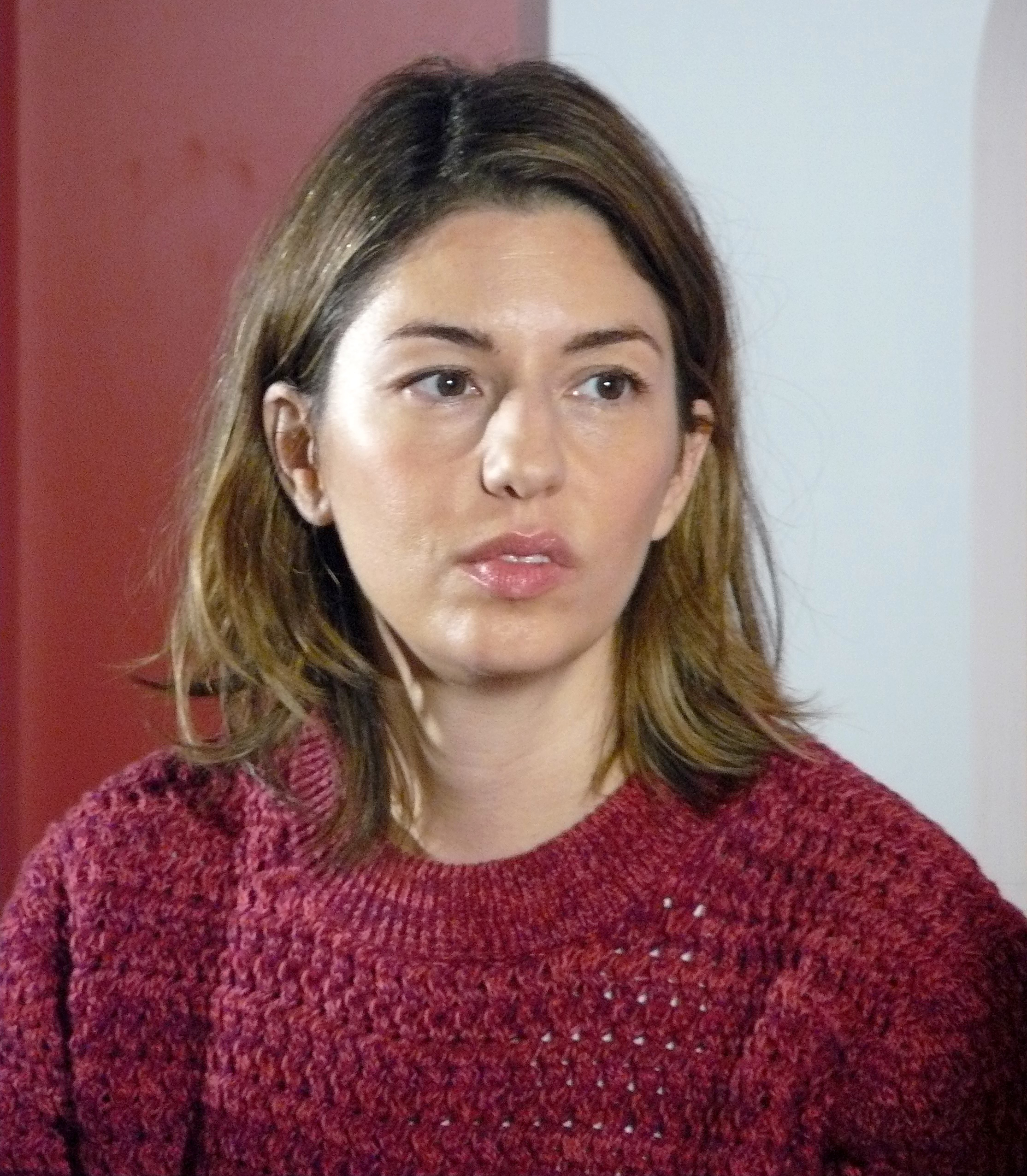
Sofia Coppola won for The Beguiled (2017)

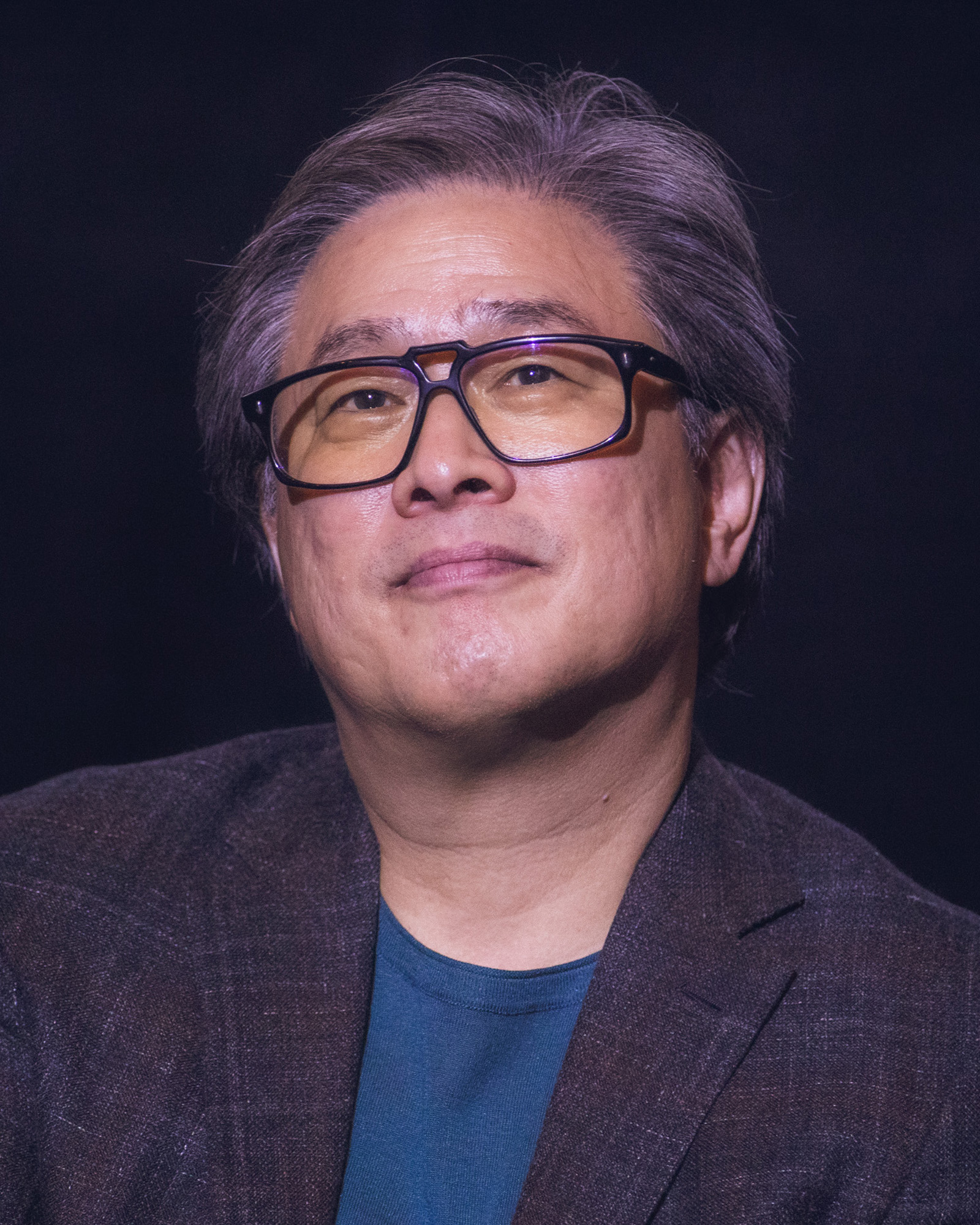
Park Chan-wook won for Decision to Leave (2022)

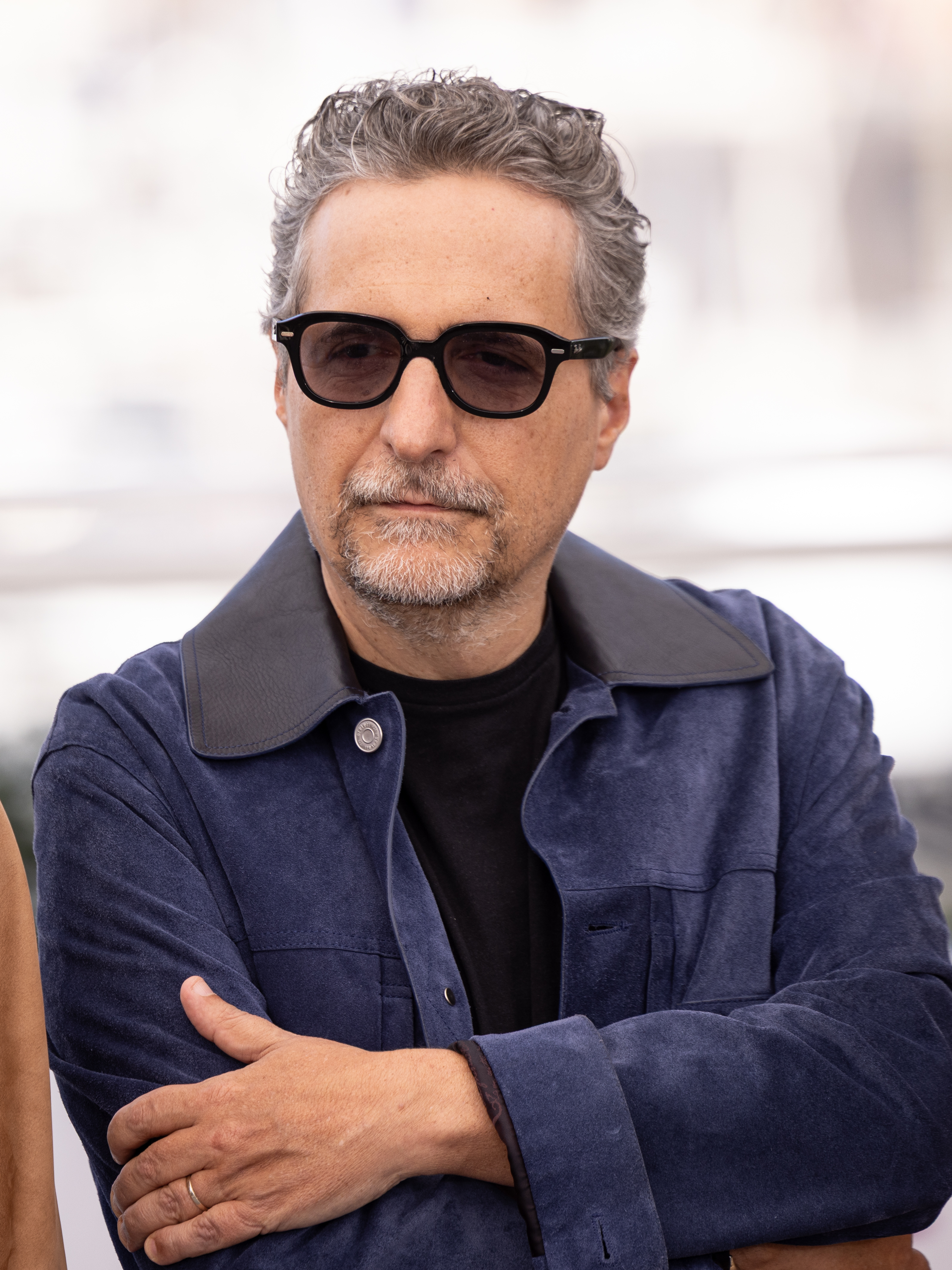
Kleber Mendonça Filho won for The Secret Agent (2025)

The award was first presented at the 1st Cannes Film Festival in 1946, René Clément was the first winner for The Battle of the Rails.

The prize was not awarded on 13 occasions (1947, 1953–54, 1960, 1962–64, 1971, 1973–74, 1977, and 1980-81).

The festival was not held at all in 1948, 1950, and 2020. In 1968, no awards were given as the festival was called off mid-way due to the May 1968 events in France.

Also, the jury vote was tied, and the prize was shared by two directors on seven occasions (1955, 1969, 1975, 1983, 2001–02, and 2016). Joel Coen of the Coen brothers has received the most awards in this category, with three. Two directing teams have shared the award: Jean-Pierre & Luc Dardenne for Young Ahmed (2019) and Javier Calvo and Javier Ambrossi for La bola negra (2026).

Yuliya Solntseva became the first woman to win, for Chronicle of Flaming Years (1961). While Sofia Coppola was the second and last woman to win it, for The Beguiled (2017).

The winner of the Best Director Award rarely wins the Palme d'Or, the main prize given at the festival, which is also awarded to the director of the winning film. This happened only twice: Joel Coen won both awards for Barton Fink in 1991; and Gus Van Sant won for Elephant in 2003.

== Winners ==
=== 1940s ===
| Year | Director | English Title | Original Title |
|---|---|---|---|
| 1946 | René Clément | The Battle of the Rails | La Bataille du rail |
| 1949 | René Clément | The Walls of Malapaga | Au-delà des grilles |

=== 1950s ===
| Year | Director | English Title | Original Title |
|---|---|---|---|
| 1951 | Luis Buñuel | Los Olvidados | |
| 1952 | Christian Jaque | Fanfan la Tulipe | |
| 1955 | Jules Dassin | Rififi | Du rififi chez les hommes |
| 1955 | Sergei Vasilyev | Heroes of Shipka | Герои Шипки |
| 1956 | Sergei Yutkevich | Othello | Отелло |
| 1957 | Robert Bresson | A Man Escaped | Un condamné à mort s'est échappé ou Le vent souffle où il veut |
| 1958 | Ingmar Bergman | Brink of Life | Nära livet |
| 1959 | François Truffaut | The 400 Blows | Les Quatre Cents Coups |

=== 1960s ===
| Year | Director | English Title | Original Title |
|---|---|---|---|
| 1961 | Yuliya Solntseva | Chronicle of Flaming Years | Повесть пламенных лет |
| 1965 | Liviu Ciulei | Forest of the Hanged | Pădurea spânzuraților |
| 1966 | Sergei Yutkevich | Lenin in Poland | Ленин в Польше |
| 1967 | Ferenc Kósa | Ten Thousand Days | Tízezer nap |
| 1969 | Glauber Rocha | Antonio das Mortes | O Dragão da Maldade contra o Santo Guerreiro |
| 1969 | Vojtěch Jasný | All My Compatriots | Všichni dobří rodáci |

=== 1970s ===
| Year | Director | English Title | Original Title |
|---|---|---|---|
| 1970 | John Boorman | Leo the Last | |
| 1972 | Miklós Jancsó | Red Psalm | Még kér a nép |
| 1975 | Michel Brault | Orders | Les Ordres |
| 1975 | Costa-Gavras | Special Section | Section spéciale |
| 1976 | Ettore Scola | Down and Dirty | Brutti, sporchi e cattivi |
| 1978 | Nagisa Ōshima | Empire of Passion | 愛の亡霊 |
| 1979 | Terrence Malick | Days of Heaven | |

=== 1980s ===
| Year | Director | English Title | Original Title |
|---|---|---|---|
| 1982 | Werner Herzog | Fitzcarraldo | |
| 1983 | Robert Bresson | L'Argent | |
| 1983 | Andrei Tarkovsky | Nostalghia | |
| 1984 | Bertrand Tavernier | A Sunday in the Country | Un dimanche à la campagne |
| 1985 | André Téchiné | Rendez-vous | |
| 1986 | Martin Scorsese | After Hours | |
| 1987 | Wim Wenders | Wings of Desire | Der Himmel über Berlin |
| 1988 | Fernando Solanas | Sur | |
| 1989 | Emir Kusturica | Time of the Gypsies | Дом за вешање |

=== 1990s ===
| Year | Director | English Title | Original Title |
|---|---|---|---|
| 1990 | Pavel Lungin | Taxi Blues | Такси-блюз |
| 1991 | Joel Coen | Barton Fink | |
| 1992 | Robert Altman | The Player | |
| 1993 | Mike Leigh | Naked | |
| 1994 | Nanni Moretti | Caro diario | |
| 1995 | Mathieu Kassovitz | La Haine | |
| 1996 | Joel Coen | Fargo | |
| 1997 | Wong Kar-wai | Happy Together | 春光乍洩 |
| 1998 | John Boorman | The General | |
| 1999 | Pedro Almodóvar | All About My Mother | Todo sobre mi madre |

=== 2000s ===
| Year | Director | English Title | Original Title |
|---|---|---|---|
| 2000 | Edward Yang | Yi Yi | 一一 |
| 2001 | Joel Coen | The Man Who Wasn't There | |
| 2001 | David Lynch | Mulholland Drive | |
| 2002 | Paul Thomas Anderson | Punch-Drunk Love | |
| 2002 | Im Kwon-taek | Chi-hwa-seon | 취화선 |
| 2003 | Gus Van Sant | Elephant | |
| 2004 | Tony Gatlif | Exils | |
| 2005 | Michael Haneke | Caché | |
| 2006 | Alejandro González Iñárritu | Babel | |
| 2007 | Julian Schnabel | The Diving Bell and the Butterfly | Le Scaphandre et le Papillon |
| 2008 | Nuri Bilge Ceylan | Three Monkeys | Üç Maymun |
| 2009 | Brillante Mendoza | Butchered | Kinatay |

=== 2010s ===
| Year | Director | English Title | Original Title |
|---|---|---|---|
| 2010 | Mathieu Amalric | On Tour | Tournée |
| 2011 | Nicolas Winding Refn | Drive | |
| 2012 | Carlos Reygadas | Post Tenebras Lux | |
| 2013 | Amat Escalante | Heli | |
| 2014 | Bennett Miller | Foxcatcher | |
| 2015 | Hou Hsiao-hsien | The Assassin | 刺客聶隱娘 |
| 2016 | Olivier Assayas | Personal Shopper | |
| 2016 | Cristian Mungiu | Graduation | Bacalaureat |
| 2017 | Sofia Coppola | The Beguiled | |
| 2018 | Paweł Pawlikowski | Cold War | Zimna wojna |
| 2019 | Jean-Pierre and Luc Dardenne | Young Ahmed | Le Jeune Ahmed |

=== 2020s ===
| Year | Director | English Title | Original Title | Ref. |
|---|---|---|---|---|
| 2021 | Leos Carax | Annette | | |
| 2022 | Park Chan-wook | Decision to Leave | 헤어질 결심 | |
| 2023 | Tran Anh Hung | The Taste of Things | La Passion de Dodin Bouffant | |
| 2024 | Miguel Gomes | Grand Tour | | |
| 2025 | Kleber Mendonça Filho | The Secret Agent | O Agente Secreto | |
| 2026 | Javier Calvo and Javier Ambrossi | La bola negra | | |
| 2026 | Paweł Pawlikowski | Fatherland | Vaterland | |

== Multiple winners ==
The following individuals received two or more Best Director awards:

| Number of Wins | Directors | Nationality | Films |
|---|---|---|---|
| 3 | Joel Coen | United States | Barton Fink (1991), Fargo (1996), The Man Who Wasn't There (2001) |
| 2 | René Clément | France | The Battle of the Rails (1946), The Walls of Malapaga (1949) |
| 2 | Robert Bresson | France | A Man Escaped (1957), L'Argent (1983) |
| 2 | Sergei Yutkevich | Soviet Union | Othello (1956), Lenin in Poland (1966) |
| 2 | John Boorman | United Kingdom | Leo the Last (1970), The General (1998) |
| 2 | Paweł Pawlikowski | Poland | Cold War (2018), Fatherland (2026) |

== See also ==
- Silver Bear for Best Director
- Silver Lion
