= Sergei Yutkevich =

Soviet film director and screenwriter (1904–1985)

- Sergei Yutkevich
- Born: Sergei Iosifovich Yutkevich; 28 December 1904; Saint Petersburg, Russian Empire
- Died: 23 April 1985 (aged 80); Moscow, RSFSR, USSR
- Occupations: Film director, screenwriter
- Years active: 1925–1980

Sergei Iosifovich Yutkevich (Russian: Сергей Иосифович Юткевич; 28 December 1904 – 23 April 1985) was a Soviet film director and screenwriter. He was a People's Artist of the USSR (1962) and a Hero of Socialist Labour (1974).

== Life and career ==
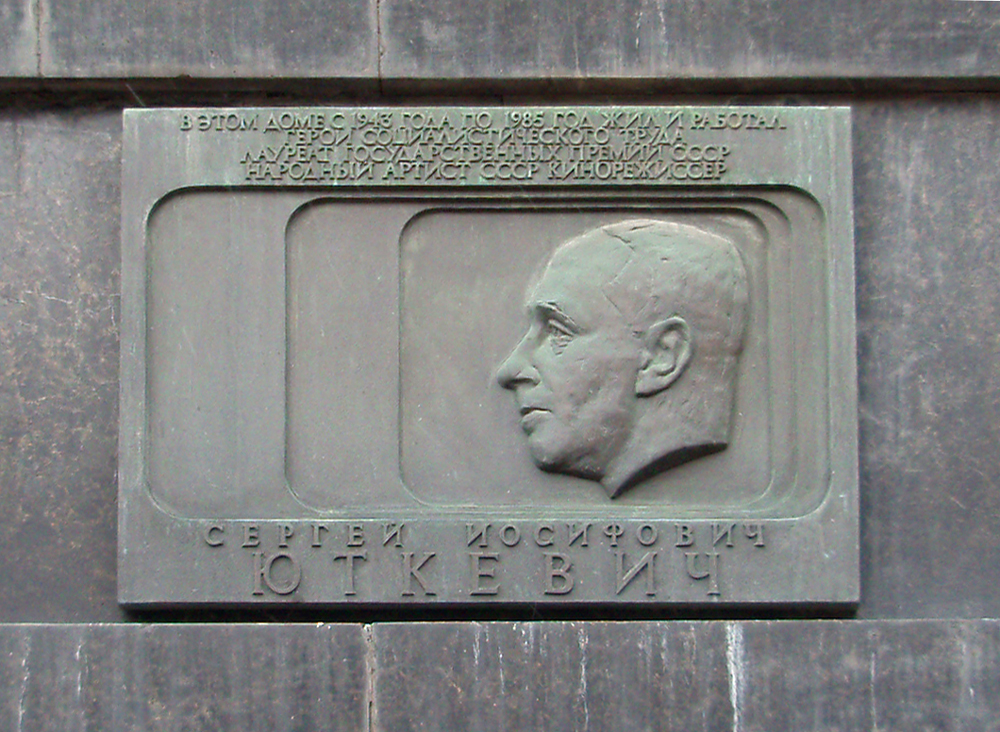
Memorial to Sergei Yutkevich on wall of building in Moscow, where he lived

He began work as a teen doing puppet shows. Between 1921 and 1923 he studied under Vsevolod Meyerhold. Later he helped found the Factory of the Eccentric Actor (FEKS), which was primarily concerned with circus and music hall acts. He entered films in the 1920s and began directing in 1928. His films often were cheerier than most Russian films as he was influenced by American slapstick, among other things. However he also did serious historical films, docudramas, and biopics.

He won Cannes Film Festival Award for Best Director twice: for Othello in 1956 and for Lenin in Poland in 1966. Of his later films Lenin in Paris is among the best known. In 1959, 1961 and 1967 respectively, he was a member of the jury at the 1st Moscow International Film Festival, the 2nd Moscow International Film Festival and the President of the Jury of the 5th Moscow International Film Festival.

He died on 23 April 1985 in Moscow.

== Filmography ==
- Lace (1928)
- Golden Mountains (1931)
- Counterplan (1932) (together with Fridrikh Ermler and Lev Arnshtam)
- The Miners (1937)
- The Man with the Gun (1938)
- Yakov Sverdlov (1940)
- Hello Moscow! (1945)
- Light over Russia (1947)
- Three Encounters (1948) (together with Aleksandr Ptushko and Vsevolod Pudovkin)
- Przhevalsky (1951)
- The Great Warrior Skanderbeg (1953)
- Othello (1955)
- Stories About Lenin (1957)
- Bath
- Lenin in Poland (1965)
- Subject for a Short Story (1969)
- Mayakovskiy smeyotsya (1975)
- Lenin in Paris (1981) (together with Leonid Eidlin)

== See also ==
- Vsevolod Meyerhold State Theatre
