= Maksim Shtraukh =

Soviet actor and theatre director (1900–1974)

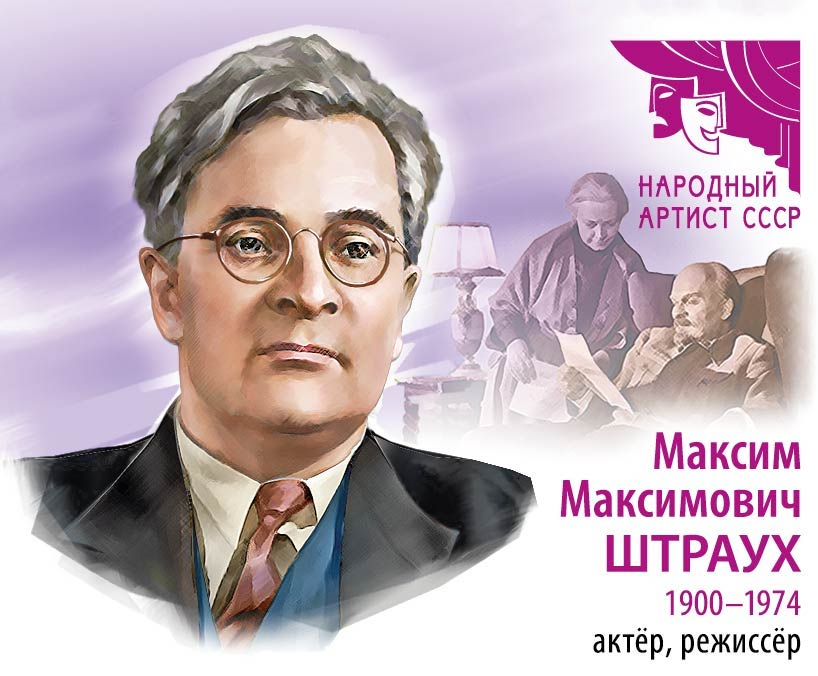
- Born: Maksim Maksimovich Shtraukh; 23 February 1900; Moscow, Russian Empire
- Died: 3 January 1974 (aged 73); Moscow, Russian SFSR, Soviet Union
- Occupations: Actor, theatre director
- Years active: 1925–1974
- Awards: Two Stalin Prizes second degree (1946, 1951). Stalin Prize first degree (1946). Lenin Prize (1959).

Maksim Maksimovich Shtraukh (Russian: Макси́м Макси́мович Штра́ух; 23 February 1900 – 3 January 1974) was a Soviet and Russian film and theatre actor. He was awarded the People's Artist of the USSR in 1965.

Shtraukh is known for playing Vladimir Lenin on stage and in film. He had a privilege to get a discount for V. I. Lenin bust at any USSR shop.

== Selected filmography ==
- 1923 – Glumov's Diary
- 1924 – Strike
- 1925 – Battleship Potemkin
- 1929 – The General Line
- 1929 – The Ghost That Never Returns
- 1930 – The Civil Servant
- 1933 – The Deserter
- 1933 – The Conveyor of Death
- 1934 – The Four Visits of Samuel Wolfe
- 1936 – A Severe Young Man
- 1938 – Doctor Aybolit
- 1938 – The Man with the Gun
- 1938 – The Vyborg Side
- 1940 – Yakov Sverdlov
- 1942 – His Name Is Sukhe-Bator
- 1943 – Two Soldiers
- 1943 – The Young Fritz
- 1946 – The Vow
- 1947 – Light over Russia
- 1948 – The Court of Honor
- 1949 – The Battle of Stalingrad
- 1949 – The Fall of Berlin
- 1950 – Conspiracy of the Doomed – Stalin Prize second degree (1951).
- 1956 – Murder on Dante Street
- 1957 – Stories About Lenin
- 1957 – Leningrad Symphony
- 1965 – Lenin in Poland

== See also ==
- Vsevolod Meyerhold State Theatre
