= The Russian Question =

- German film poster
- Directed by: Mikhail Romm
- Screenplay by: Mikhail Romm
- Starring: Vsevolod Aksyonov; Yelena Kuzmina; Mikhail Astangov
- Cinematography: Boris Volchek
- Music by: Aram Khachaturian
- Production company: Mosfilm
- Release date: 8 March 1947
- Running time: 88 minutes
- Country: Soviet Union
- Language: Russian

The Russian Question (Russian: Русский вопрос, Russkiy vopros) is a Soviet political drama by renowned filmmaker Mikhail Romm. Shot at the Mosfilm studio, the film is an adaptation of a play of the same name by Soviet poet and journalist Konstantin Simonov.

== Plot ==
The Russian Question (full film)

New York, 1946: a leading US newspaper company sends Harry Smith, a talented correspondent, to the Soviet Union. His task is to write a scaremongering report about the Soviet belligerent and expansionist intentions in order to further a widespread campaign of propaganda undertaken by the American media and the conservative elite. Harry, a former war correspondent, accepts the attractive deal and sets off to Soviet Russia only to fall in love with a country quite different from the picture shown by the "free press" in its Cold War adversary. Back in the United States, Harry finds himself torn by a dilemma between his consciousness as an honest journalist, and the menacing pressure of his superiors, forcing him to write a convenient untruth.

== Premise ==
Keeping its ideological design in mind, The Russian Question remains a sophisticated and objective, if somewhat critical portrayal of American Cold War political society. Unlike many other Soviet propaganda films, Romm's drama takes on an American perspective, only showing the Soviet Union discussed in the movie for a short combination of shots. The bulk of the film is centered on American culture, society, politics, history, economy and way of life.

== Cast ==
- Vsevolod Aksyonov — Harry Smith
- Yelena Kuzmina — Jessie West
- Mikhail Astangov — McPherson
- Mikhail Nazvanov — Jack Gould
- Boris Tenin — Bob Murphy
- Mariya Barabanova — Meg
- Arkady Tsinman — Bill Preston
- Boris Poslavsky — Hardy
- Gennady Yudin — Parker
- Sergei Antimonov — Kessler
- Mikhail Troyanovsky — Fred Williams
- Viktor Dragunsky — Radio announcer
- Georgy Georgiu — Hairdresser (uncredited)
- Valentin Zubkov — Chauffeur (uncredited)
- Vladimir Kirillin — Journalist (uncredited)

== Awards ==
- 1948 — Stalin Prize, 1st class (director Mikhail Romm, cinematographer Boris Volchek, actors Vsevolod Aksyonov, Mikhail Astangov, Yelena Kuzmina, Mikhail Nazvanov and Boris Tenin)
- 1991 — Berlin International Film Festival
