= A Severe Young Man =

- Russian: Строгий юноша
- Directed by: Abram Room
- Written by: Yury Olesha
- Starring: Dmitri Dorlyak; Olga Zhizneva; Yuri Yuryev; Maksim Shtraukh; Valentina Serova
- Cinematography: Yuri Yekelchik
- Music by: Gavriil Popov
- Production company: Ukrainfilm
- Release date: 1936
- Running time: 100 minutes
- Country: Soviet Union
- Language: Russian

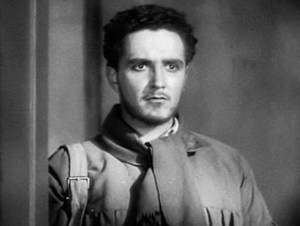
A still from the film "A severe Young Man"

A Severe Young Man (Russian: Строгий юноша) is a 1936 Soviet drama film directed by Abram Room.

== Plot ==
The film tells about a young sportsman Gregory, who falls in love with the wife of an outstanding scientist - Julian Nikolayevich Stepanov. After completion, the film was suppressed until the 1970s because it did not conform to the Soviet doctrine of Socialist Realism.

== Cast ==
- Dmitri Dorlyak as Grisha Fokin
- Olga Zhizneva as Masha Stepanova
- Yuri Yuryev as Professor Yuliyan Stepanov
- Maksim Shtraukh as Fyodor Tsitronov
- Valentina Serova as Liza
- Georgiy Sochevko as Kolya
- Irina Volodko as Olga
- Aleksandr Chistyakov as Olga's Father
- Dmitri Golubinsky as Surgeon Ivan Germanovich
- Ekaterina Melnikova as Grisha's Mother
