= Mikhail Nazvanov =

Soviet actor

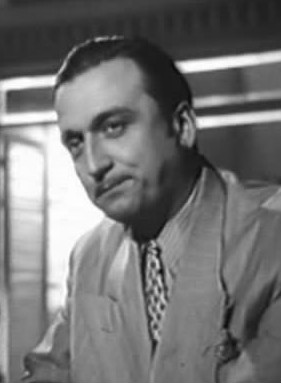
- Mikhail Nazvanov in The Russian Question (1947)
- Born: Mikhail Mikhailovich Nazvanov; 12 February 1914; Moscow, Russian Empire
- Died: 13 July 1964 (aged 50); Moscow, Soviet Union
- Occupation: Actor
- Years active: 1931–1964

Mikhail Mikhailovich Nazvanov (Russian: Михаил Михайлович Названов; 12 April 1918 – 13 July 1964) was a Soviet and Russian stage and film actor. He was awarded Honored Artist of the RSFSR in 1949.

== Biography ==
Mikhail Nazvanov was born in Moscow in the wealthy family of a technologist Mikhail K. Nazhanov; his mother, Olga Nikolayevna Butomo-Nazhanova, was a famous chamber singer. In 1931 he graduated from Academic Music College.

Between 1931 and 1935 Nazvanov studied acting at the Drama Studio of the Moscow Art Theatre. April 1935 he was arrested and until 1940 imprisoned in Gulag (article 58-10, Ukhtpechlag).

In 1942 Nazvanov was invited to join the Mossovet Theatre; between 1950 and 1957 he was member of the troupe at the Moscow Pushkin Drama Theatre. In 1957 he was again invited to join the Art Theater, which, however, left in 1960 and became actor in the Mosfilm-studio. As a stage actor he played Trigorin in The Seagull, Krechinsky in Krechinsky's Wedding, Ripafratta in The Mistress of the Inn, Robert Chiltern in An Ideal Husband, and Stiva Oblonsky in Anna Karenina.

Mikhail Nazvanov made his film debut in 1943 in the popular film Wait for Me and immediately gained fame. Sergei Eisenstein invited him to the role of Andrey Kurbsky in Ivan the Terrible. He collaborated also with such famous directors as Grigori Aleksandrov (Encounter at the Elbe, The Composer Glinka), Vsevolod Pudovkin (Zhukovsky), Mikhail Romm (The Russian Question, Attack from the Sea), Grigori Kozintsev (Belinsky, Hamlet). Nazvanov has also directed film The Mistress of the Inn.

== Selected filmography ==
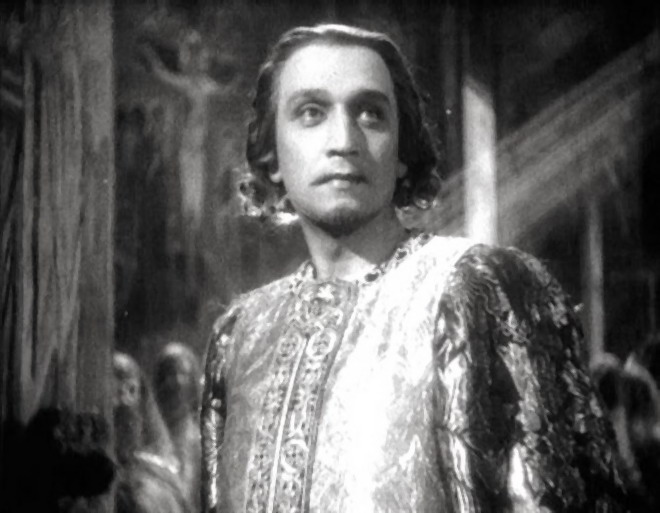
Mikhail Nazvanov as Kurbsky (Ivan the Terrible)

- Wait for Me (1943) as Andrei Panov
- Ivan the Terrible (1945/58) as prince Andrey Kurbsky
- The Great Glinka (1946) as hussar Kostya
- The Russian Question (1947) as Jack Gould – Stalin Prize first degree (1948)
- Encounter at the Elbe (1949) as James Hill – Stalin Prize first degree (1950)
- The Battle of Stalingrad (1949) as Colonel Ivan Lyudnikov
- Taras Shevchenko (1951) as Nicholas I of Russia, Alexander II of Russia
- Belinsky (1951) as Nicholas I of Russia
- Zhukovsky (1951) as Ryabushinsky
- The Composer Glinka (1952) as Nicholas I of Russia
- Attack from the Sea (1952) as Alexander I of Russia
- The Safety Match (1954) as Mark Ivanovich Klyauzov
- The Mistress of the Inn (1956) as Ripafratta (also director)
- Gutta-percha Boy (1957) as Karl Bogdanovich Bekker
- Duel (1960) as Vladimir Nikolayev
- The Fight on a Way (1961) as Semyon Valgan
- My Younger Brother (1962) as Andrei Ivanovich, professor
- Hamlet (1964) as Claudius

== Honors and awards ==
- Honored Artist of the RSFSR (1949)
- Two Stalin Prizes first degree (1948, 1950)
- Stalin Prize second degree (1949)
- Order of the Badge of Honour (1950)
