= Vsevolod Aksyonov =

Soviet and Russian actor (1902–1960)

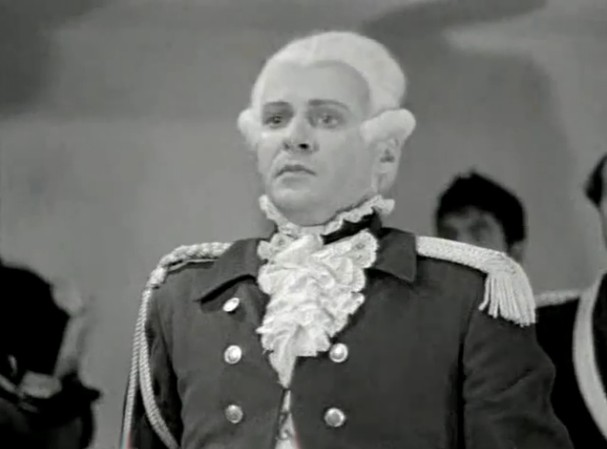
- As Meshchersky in Suvorov (1940)
- Born: Vsevolod Nikolayevich Aksyonov; 19 April 1902; Moscow, Russian Empire
- Died: 29 March 1960 (aged 57); Moscow, Soviet Union
- Occupation: Actor
- Years active: 1920–1960
- Spouses: Elena Gogoleva; Marina Semyonova

Vsevolod Nikolayevich Aksyonov (Russian: Всеволод Николаевич Аксёнов; 19 April 1902 – 29 March 1960) was a Soviet and Russian stage and film actor. Honored Artist of the RSFSR (1947).

== Filmography ==
- Suvorov (1940) – Meshchersky
- The Russian Question (1947) – Harry Smith
- Conspiracy of the Doomed (1950) – Nikola Sloveno
- Zhukovsky (1950) – as Grand Duke Alexander Mikhailovich
- Far from the Motherland (1960) – as Willi Berthold

== Awards ==
- Medal "For Valiant Labour in the Great Patriotic War 1941–1945"
- Medal "In Commemoration of the 800th Anniversary of Moscow"
- Honored Artist of the RSFSR (1947)
- Stalin Prize, 1st class (1948) – for his portrayal of Harry Smith in The Russian Question
