= Margret Nikolova =

Bulgarian pop singer (1928–2026)

- Маргрет Николова
- Born: 10 October 1928; Sofia, Kingdom of Bulgaria
- Died: 13 April 2026 (aged 97)
- Occupation: Singer
- Years active: 1948–2000
- Labels: Balkanton; Melodiya; Boyko Kanev; BG Company
- Title: Honored Artist of Bulgaria (1964)
- Musical career
- Genres: Pop; romance; ballad
- Instruments: Vocals

Margret Nikolova (Bulgarian: Маргрет Николова; 10 October 1928 – 13 April 2026) was a Bulgarian pop singer. She was awarded the title of Honored Artist of Bulgaria in 1964.

== Life and career ==
In 1964, Nikolova performed at a Sopot International Song Festival, where she won third place. In 1969 the song I Had a Dream (Bulgarian: Сън сънувах), which she performed together with Kiril Semov, won the grand prize of the festival Golden Orpheus for Bulgarian song. Nikolova became widely known in the Soviet Union in a duet with Georgi Kordov thanks to the performance of song Alyosha.

Nikolova's husband Pyotr Nikolov is a writer.

In 2000, the then 72-year-old singer stopped her professional and creative activity.

Nikolova died on 13 April 2026, at the age of 97.

== Honours ==
- Order of Saints Cyril and Methodius II degrees (1961)
- Order of the Red Banner of Labor (1961)
- Crystal Necklace Award from the Union of Music and Dance Figures in Bulgaria (2018)
