= The Miners =

- Russian: Шахтёры
- Directed by: Sergei Yutkevich
- Written by: Aleksei Kapler
- Starring: Boris Poslavsky; Yuriy Tolubeev; Vladimir Lukin
- Cinematography: Iosif Martov
- Music by: Boris Golts
- Release date: 1937
- Country: Soviet Union
- Language: Russian

The Miners (Russian: Шахтёры, romanized: Shakhtyory) is a 1937 Soviet adventure drama film directed by Sergei Yutkevich.

== Plot ==
The chief of one mine in a small town in the Donbas Chub is playing along with the Trotskyites and bandits. A certain Semyon Primak arrives at the mine and begins to confront Chub. Slaughterer Matvey Bobylyov, in spite of their disassembly, begins to mine coal with a completely new method.

== Cast ==
- Boris Poslavsky
- Yuriy Tolubeev
- Vladimir Lukin
- Zoya Fyodorova
- Yefim Altus
- Mark Bernes
- Stepan Kayukov
- Stepan Kuznetsov
- Konstantin Nazarenko
- Nina Rusinova as Olga Bobylyova
