= Yakov Sverdlov (film) =

1940 Soviet biographical film

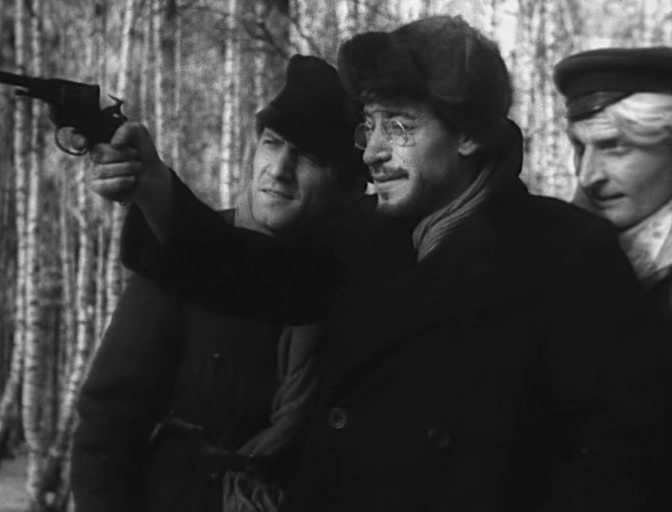
- Movie image of Yakov Sverdlov played by Leonid Lyubashevsky
- Russian: Яков Свердлов
- Directed by: Sergei Yutkevich
- Written by: Boris Levin; Pyotr Pavlenko
- Starring: Leonid Lyubashevsky; Maksim Shtraukh; Andro Kobaladze; Pavel Kadochnikov; Nikolay Kryuchkov
- Cinematography: Iosif Martov
- Music by: David Blok
- Release date: 1940
- Country: Soviet Union

Yakov Sverdlov, (Russian: Яков Свердлов) is a 1940 Soviet biographical drama film directed by Sergei Yutkevich. The film tells about the life and work of the Chairman of the Central Executive Committee Yakov Sverdlov.

== Plot ==
The film depicts the life and activities of Yakov Mikhailovich Sverdlov (1885–1919), the second chairman of the All-Russian Central Executive Committee (VTsIK).

In 1902, young Yakov Sverdlov, while at an antiquarian shop at the Nizhny Novgorod Fair, finds a printing press for an underground printing house. Maxim Gorky helps him raise money to purchase it. In the underground movement, Sverdlov’s organizational talent grows stronger.

In 1905, Sverdlov conducts extensive agitation among the Ural workers, urging them to rise up against Tsarism. His sincerity, simplicity, and attentiveness to the common people make him a welcome guest in any worker's home. The son of a worker, Lyonka Sukhov, maintains a lifelong affection for him. Tsarist authorities track Sverdlov down and imprison him, but even in prison, he continues to resist. In response to the prison administration's repression, Sverdlov initiates a hunger strike among the prisoners. Sverdlov is eventually exiled to Siberia.

In 1917, Lenin and Sverdlov are in Petrograd. From the podium of the Constituent Assembly, Sverdlov dismisses the Socialist Revolutionary orator and announces the first decrees of Soviet power. As chairman of the VTsIK, Sverdlov travels to Nizhny Novgorod, where enemies masquerading as allies under the leadership of the Trotskyist Mironov are causing trouble. Sverdlov’s sharp speech, which exposes the traitors, clears up the confusion among the deceived workers and helps the party organization defeat the Trotskyists. Mironov is eventually sent to the front, where he treacherously shoots Sverdlov’s friend, worker Trofimov. Although severely ill, Sverdlov prepares for the 8th Party Congress. Lenin visits him despite his sickness. Until the last moment, Sverdlov remains the chairman. At the 8th Party Congress, Lenin delivers a speech in his memory.

== Cast ==
- Leonid Lyubashevsky as Yakov Sverdlov
- Maksim Shtraukh as Lenin
- Andro Kobaladze as Stalin
- Pavel Kadochnikov as Maxim Gorky and Lyonka Sukhov
- Vasily Markov as Felix Dzerzhinsky
- Pavel Shpringfeld as Alexei Sukhov
- Nikolay Kryuchkov as Trofimow
- Irina Fedotova as Zina Mironov
- Nikolay Gorlov as Mironov
- Aleksandr Grechanyi as Votinov
- Ivan Nazarov as Akim
- Nikolai Okhlopkov as Feodor Chaliapin
- Igor Smirnov as adolescent Lyonka Sukhov
- Kseniya Tarasova as Anisa Sukhov
- Vladimir Vladislavskiy as Kazimir Petrovich
- Ivan Lyubeznov as criminal
