= Eduard Kolmanovsky =

Russian composer (1923–1994)

- Эдуард Колмановский
- Born: Eduard Savelievich Kolmanovsky; 9 January 1923; Mogilev, USSR
- Died: 27 July 1994 (aged 71); Moscow, Russia
- Other names: Erik Kolmanovsky
- Education: Moscow Conservatory
- Occupations: Composer, songwriter, film composer
- Years active: 1943–1982
- Awards: People's Artist of the USSR
- People's Artist of the RSFSR
- Honored Artist of the RSFSR
- USSR State Prize
- Website: e-kolmanovski.narod.ru

Eduard Savelievich Kolmanovsky (Russian: Эдуа́рд Саве́льевич Колмано́вский; 9 January 1923 – 27 July 1994) was a Soviet and Russian composer. He was awarded a USSR State Prize in 1984 and named a People's Artist of the USSR in 1991. A large part of his songs are dedicated to the themes of patriotic consciousness and civic awareness. Among them are: I Love You, Life (1958), Do the Russians Want War? (1961), Alyosha (1966).
