= Do the Russians Want War? =

Single by Mark Bernes
- Released: 1961
- Genre: Anti-war song
- Length: 2:47
- Label: Melodiya
- Songwriters: Yevgeny Yevtushenko (lyrics), Eduard Kolmanovsky (music)

Audio sample
- Original theme intro, performed by Mark Bernes: file; help

"Do the Russians Want War?" (Russian: «Хотят ли русские войны?», romanized: Khotyat li russkiye voyny?) is a 1961 anti-war song written by Yevgeny Yevtushenko and set to music by Eduard Kolmanovsky.

Yevtushenko later said he wrote the song in response to conversations he had with foreigners while traveling in Western Europe and the United States. The lyrics evoke the peaceful Russian countryside, the memory of the millions of lives lost in the Second World War, and the friendly meeting of U.S. and Soviet soldiers on Elbe Day.

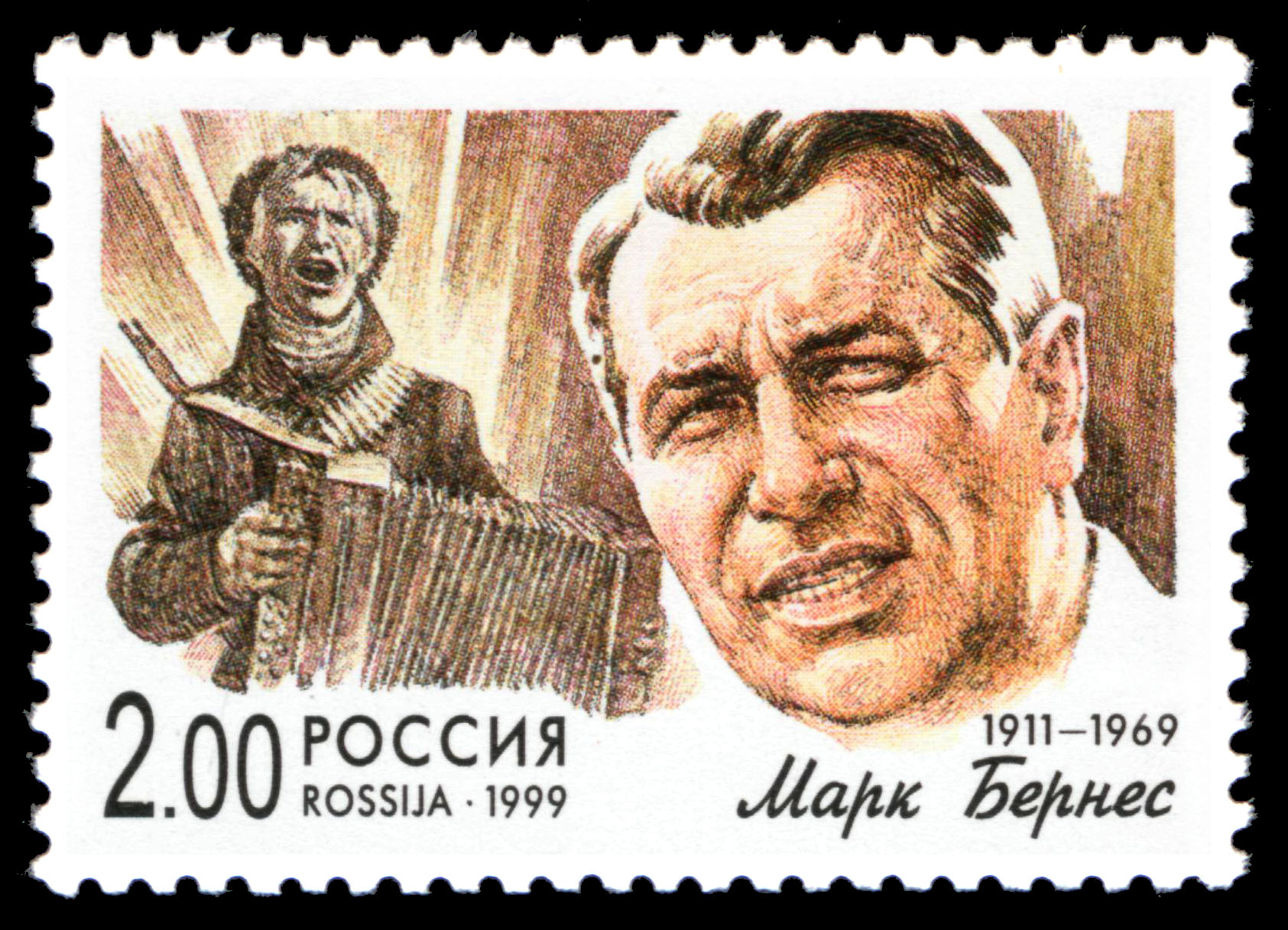
Russian postage stamp issued in 1999 to commemorate the singer Mark Bernes.

The song was first performed by Mark Bernes, who had collaborated with Kolmanovsky before. Upon first hearing the song in a recording studio, Bernes disliked the melody and persuaded Kolmanovsky to rewrite the music. Bernes performed the song in public on the eve of the 22nd party conference of the Soviet Communist Party in 1961.

The following year, delegates to the World Congress for Peace and Disarmament in Moscow received a phonograph record of "Do the Russians Want War?" sung in English, French, German, and Spanish translations. The song was also sung at the 1962 World Festival of Youth and Students in Helsinki. These two events helped popularize the song around the world.

In 1967 the Alexandrov Ensemble performed "Do the Russians Want War?" on a tour of Italy, Belgium, France, Switzerland, and the United Kingdom. Just before a performance at the Royal Albert Hall in London, local authorities requested that the ensemble not perform the song, which some Britons regarded as communist propaganda. The ensemble objected to the request and the song was included in the concert program.

The poem was cited by Ukrainian President Volodymyr Zelenskyy in his address to the Russian people immediately prior to the Russian invasion of Ukraine.

== Charts ==
=== Mark Bernes version ===
Weekly chart performance for "Khotyat li russkiye voyny?"
Chart (2026)	Peak position
Russia Streaming (TopHit)	91

== See also ==
- "Russians"
