= Mark Bernes =

Soviet actor and singer (1911–1969)

- Марк Бернес
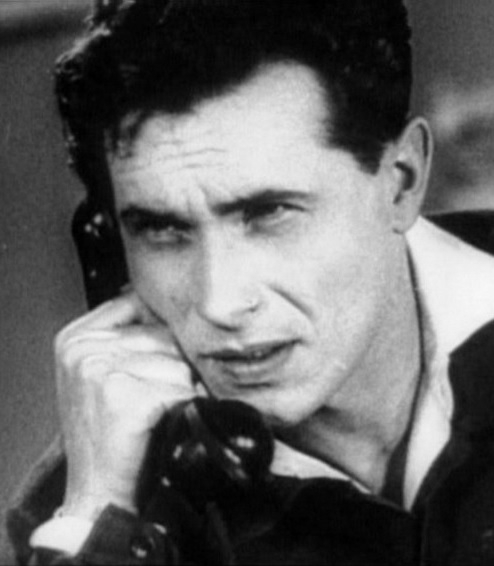
- Bernes in The Miners (1937)
- Born: Menakhem-Man Neukh-Shmuylov Neyman; 8 October 1911; Nezhin, Chernigov Governorate, Russian Empire
- Died: 16 August 1969 (aged 57); Moscow, Russian SFSR, Soviet Union
- Resting place: Novodevichy Cemetery, Moscow
- Occupations: Actor; singer
- Years active: 1929–1969

Mark Naumovich Bernes (Russian: Марк Нау́мович Берне́с; born Menakhem-Man Neukh-Shmuylov Neyman [Мена́хем-Ман Не́ух-Шму́йлов Не́йман]; 8 October [O.S. 25 September] 1911 – 16 August 1969) was a Soviet film actor and chansonnier. He is widely regarded as among the most popular artists of the Soviet stage in the 1950s–1960s, and performed a number of poignant songs about World War II, including "Dark Is the Night" (Russian: Тёмная ночь, romanized: Tyomnaya noch; 1943) and "Cranes" (Russian: Журавли, romanized: Zhuravli; 1969). He is also credited with playing a primary role in the formation of the golden fund of Soviet song classics. He was awarded the Stalin Prize, first degree (1951).

== Life and work ==
Soviet postcard with scenes from Bernes movies

"Shalandy polnye kefali"
Sample of "Shalandy polnye kefali" by Mark Bernes (1943)

Bernes was born to a Jewish family in Nezhin (present-day Ukraine). In the late 1930s, not long before the Second World War, Bernes starred in two motion pictures: The Man with the Gun and The Fighters. In both of these films, he performed songs which immediately became famous all over the Soviet Union after each film was released. In the former film, he performed the song "Clouds Rose over the City", which was a romantic song of a young Soviet worker. In the later film, he performed a famous patriotic ballad "Beloved Town".

When the war began, Bernes became among the first singers to perform for the Soviet troops. In 1943, he starred in the motion picture Two Soldiers. He played a young soldier from Odessa named Arkady Dzubin. In that film, he sang two songs: "Dark Is the Night" (Russian: Тёмная ночь, romanized: Tyomnaya noch) and "Scows Full of Mullet" (Russian: Шаланды полные кефали, romanized: Shalandy polnye kefali). The second song is the humorous account of Kostya, a sailor from Odessa who ironically spoke to his fiancee Sonya, a fishing girl. The first song, "Dark Is the Night" was a serious ballad about a wife with a baby waiting for a soldier in the midst of a deadly fight. The song was sung by Bernes from the point of view of that soldier, who addressed his wife at home and assured her that he will live through all the deadly battles as long as she waits for him. "Dark Is the Night" is among the most recognizable Soviet songs from World War II.

Bernes' name had become closely associated with World War II. After the war, he continued to perform songs about the war. His greatest hits of the 1950s were "Muscovites" (also known as "Seryozhka from Malaya Bronnaya Street") and "Enemies Burnt the Dear House Down" (Russian: Враги сожгли родную хату, romanized: Vragi sozhgli rodnuyu khatu). Both songs were about hardships suffered by people who lost family members in the war, and expressed extreme melancholy, directly confronting death and grief.

In 1969, Mark Bernes was dying from lung cancer. In the summer of 1969, he recorded his last song "Cranes" (Russian: Журавли́, romanized: Zhuravli), which became his swan song. Bernes sang that the soldiers that perished in war turned into cranes, that the cranes were still flying, and that he would join their ranks. On 16 August, Mark Bernes died. "Cranes" was played at his funeral.

== Popular songs ==
- "Cranes" (Журавли, Zhuravli; 1969)
- "Dark Is the Night" (Тёмная ночь, Tyomnaya noch; 1943)
- "Scows Full of Mullet" (Шаланды, полные кефали, Shalandy, polnye kefali)
- "Where Does the Motherland Begin?" (С чего начинается Родина, S chego nachinayetsya Rodina)
- "I Love You, Life" (Я люблю тебя, жизнь, Ya lyublyu tebya, zhizn)
- "Do the Russians Want War?" (Хотят ли русские войны, Khotyat li russkiye voyny)
- "Dark Mounds Are Sleeping" (Спят курганы тёмные, Spyat kurgany tyomnye)
- "When a Distant Friend Sings" (Когда поёт далёкий друг, Kogda poyot dalyokiy drug)
- "Enemies Burnt the Dear House Down" (Враги сожгли родную хату, Vragi sozhgli rodnuyu khatu)
- "The Vast Sky" (Огромное небо, Ogromnoye nebo)

== Selected filmography ==
- Convict (1936)
- The Miners (1937)
- The Man with the Gun (1938)
- A Great Life (1939)
- The Fighters (1939)
- Two Soldiers (1943)
- The Ural Front (1944)
- The Turning Point (1945)
- The Third Blow (1948)
- Far from Moscow (1950)
- Taras Shevchenko (1951)
- Maksimka (1953)
- The Boys from Leningrad (1954)
- The Frigid Sea (1954)
- Lights on the River (1954)
- School of Courage (1954)
- They Were the First (1956)
- It Happened at the Police Station (1963)
- Zhenya, Zhenechka and Katyusha (1967)
- The Shield and the Sword (1968)

== Honors ==
Bernes received People's Actor of the RSFSR (1965), was awarded the Stalin Prize (1951), Order of the Red Star, Order of the Badge of Honour, Medal "For Valiant Labour in the Great Patriotic War 1941–1945" and few other medals. in 1993, Bernes received a star in his honour on the Star Square in Moscow.

A minor planet 3038 Bernes discovered by Soviet astronomer Nikolai Chernykh in 1978 is named after him.
