= Cranes (1969 song) =

Soviet anti-war song

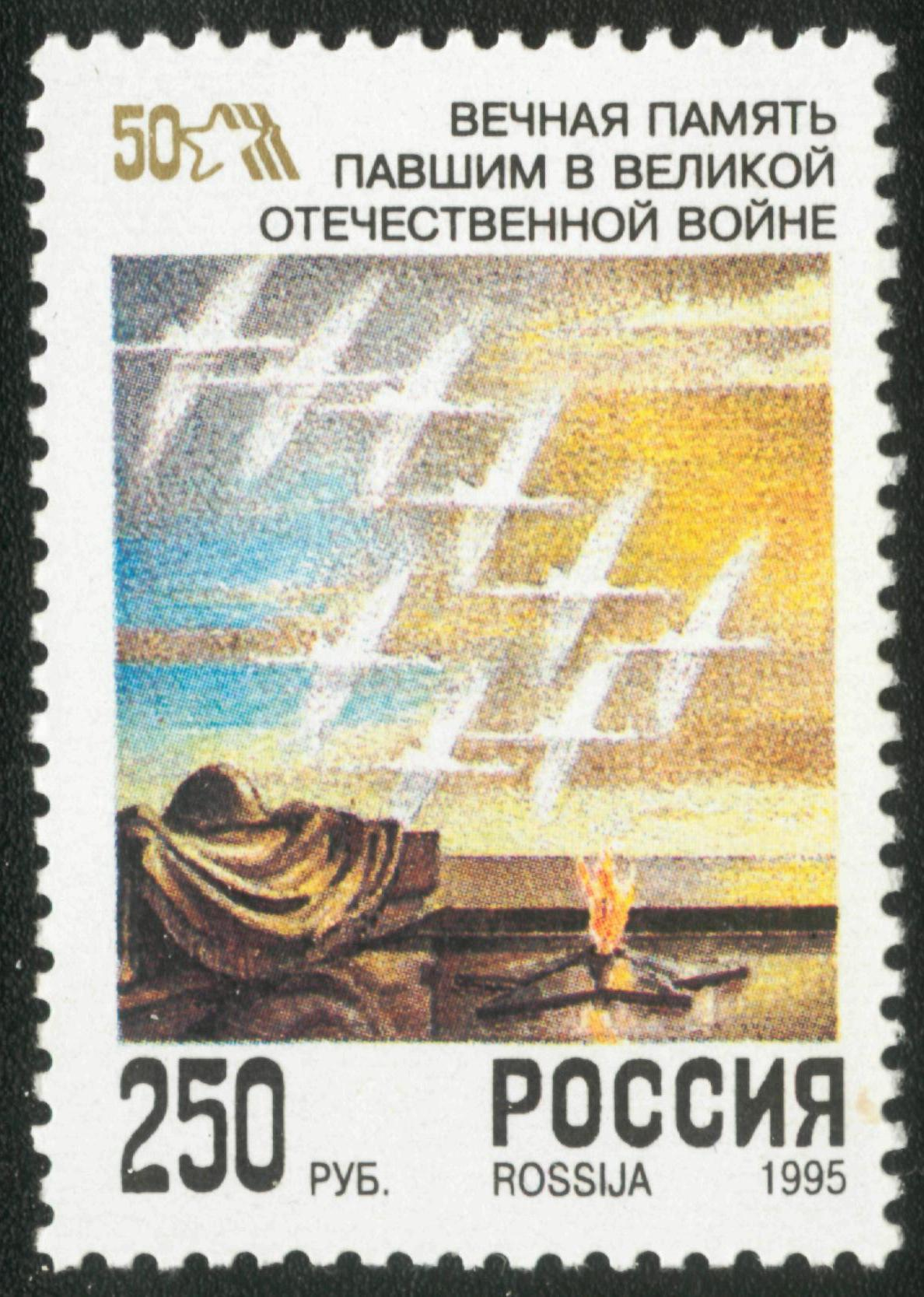
Zhuravli (above the Tomb of the Unknown Soldier) on Russian stamp, 1995

"Cranes" (Russian: «Журавли», romanized: "Zhuravli", IPA: [ʐʊrɐˈvlʲi]), first performed in 1969, is a famous Soviet and Russian song about soldiers who did not come back alive from battles. The song was composed by Yan Frenkel on translation of poem by Rasul Gamzatov and performed by Mark Bernes. "Cranes" became a symbol of the fallen soldiers of World War II.

== Inspiration ==
The Dagestani poet Rasul Gamzatov, when visiting Hiroshima, was impressed by the Hiroshima Peace Memorial Park and its monument to Sadako Sasaki, a girl who contracted leukemia as a result of the radioactive contamination of the city after the atomic bombing. Following Japanese traditions, she constructed one thousand origami cranes, hoping (in vain) that this might save her life. The memory of paper cranes folded by this girl—a girl who to this day serves as one symbol of the innocent victims of war—haunted Gamzatov for months and inspired him to write a poem starting with the now famous lines:

"I sometimes feel that the soldiers
Who have not returned from the bloody fields
Never lay down to earth
But turned into white cranes..."

== Translations ==
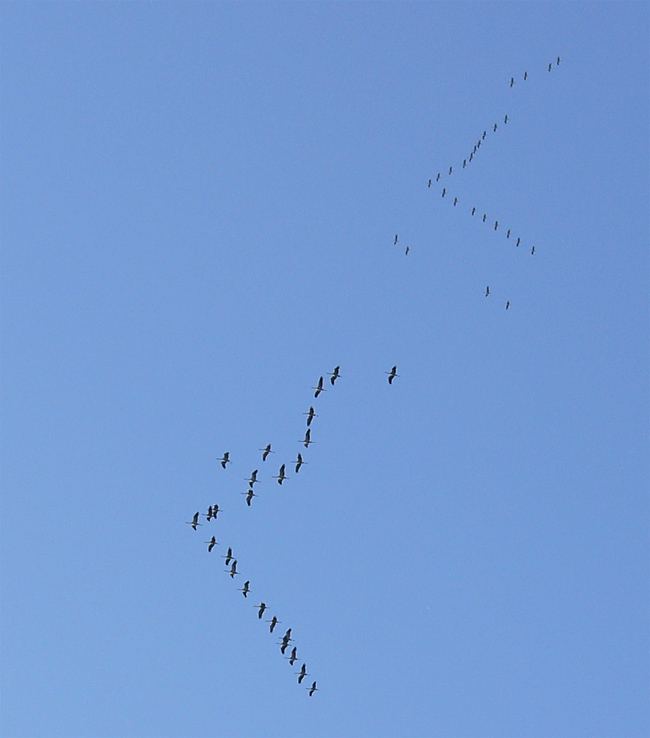
Cranes in the sky

The poem was originally written in Gamzatov's native Avar language, with many versions surrounding the initial wording. Its famous 1968 Russian translation was soon made by the prominent Russian poet and translator Naum Grebnev, and was turned into a song in 1969, becoming one of the best known Russian-language World War II ballads all over the world.

== Musical adaptation ==
The poem's publication in the journal Novy Mir caught the attention of the famous actor and crooner Mark Bernes who revised the lyrics and asked Yan Frenkel to compose the music. When Frenkel first played his new song, Bernes (who was by then suffering from lung cancer) cried because he felt that this song was about his own fate: "There is a small empty spot in the crane flock. Maybe it is reserved for me. One day I will join them, and from the skies I will call on all of you whom I had left on earth." The song was recorded on the first attempt on 9 July 1969. Bernes died on 16 August 1969, about five weeks after recording the song, and the recording was played at his funeral. Later on, "Cranes" would most often be performed by Joseph Kobzon. According to Frenkel, "Cranes" was Bernes' last record, his "true swan song."

== Legacy ==
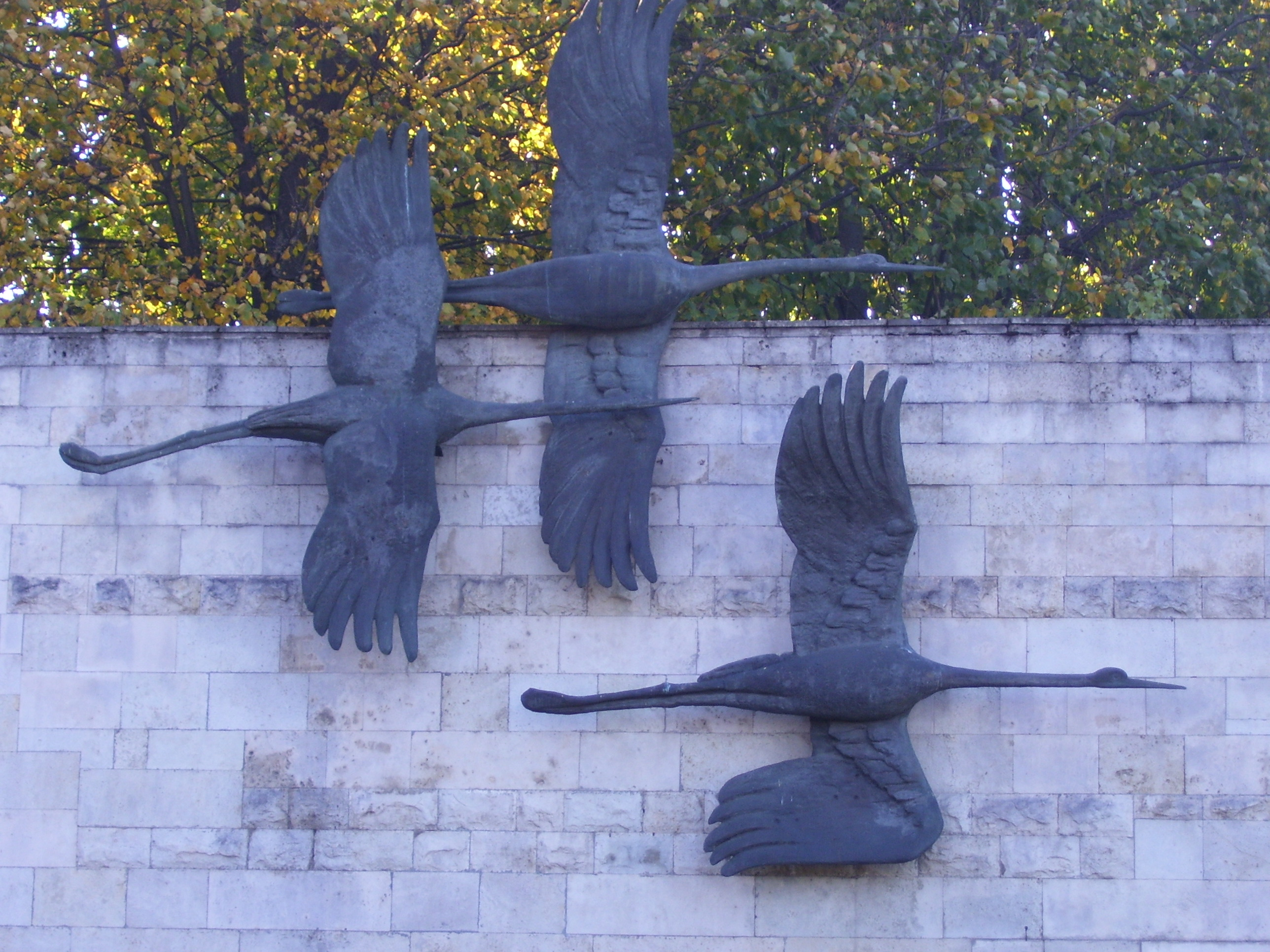
Mass grave of civilians and soldiers who died during the Siege of Leningrad (Cranes Memorial of St. Petersburg)

"Cranes" became a symbol of the fallen soldiers of World War II. So much so that a range of World War II memorials in the former Soviet Union feature the image of flying cranes and, in several instances, even verses of the song, e.g., the Cranes Memorial of St. Petersburg.

Today, "Cranes" is still one of the most popular anti-war songs in Russia.

In 1995, fifty years after the defeat of the Nazis, Russia released a stamp in memory of the fallen of World War II. The stamp depicts flying cranes against the background of the Kremlin's War Memorial to the Unknown Soldier.

In 2005, a Russian Veterans Memorial with an image of three white cranes and four lines of the poem in Russian and English was erected in Plummer Park, West Hollywood, California, United States. The cost of the 9-tonne monument was largely covered by the Los Angeles Association of Veterans of World War II, a group of Russian-speaking veterans. Local ceremonies to commemorate the end of the WWII are regularly held on the Victory Day in May.

== Covers and use in other media ==
- in 1977 the very famous Greek poet, Giannis Ritsos, translated this poem in Greek and included it in his poetic collection "11 Russian folk songs". The Greek version of the poem is sung by Margarita Zorbala and it is called "Άσπροι Γερανοί" (=in Greek "white cranes")
- In 2000, Russian opera singer Dmitry Khvorostovsky has released his own version of the song for the 55-year anniversary of Soviet Victory Day.
- In 2003 Marc Almond recorded an English version "The Storks" for his album Heart on Snow.
- This song was featured in the Korean television drama called Sandglass, starring Choi Min-soo. When Choi made a guest appearance on the variety game show Running Man, it was used as his theme song.
- The Mark Bernes version was featured in a 2017 episode ("Dyatkovo") of the television series The Americans.
- Elena Maximova released a cover version for the anniversary of Victory Day in 2021.
- Aleksandra Vorobyova performed this song in 2023.
- The Mark Bernes version was featured diagetically in the episode "I'll Believe in Anything" of the Canadian television series Heated Rivalry, when Ilya Rozanov is in Russia.

== Charts ==
=== Mark Bernes version ===
Chart performance for "Cranes"
Chart (2025)	Peak position
Russia Streaming (TopHit)	60

=== Dmitri Hvorostovsky version ===
==== Weekly charts ====
2025 weekly chart performance for "Cranes"
Chart (2025)	Peak position
Russia Streaming (TopHit)	75

2026 weekly chart performance for "Cranes"
Chart (2026)	Peak position
Russia Streaming (TopHit)	72

==== Monthly charts ====
2025 monthly chart performance for "Cranes"
Chart (2025)	Peak position
Russia Streaming (TopHit)	87

2026 monthly chart performance for "Cranes"
Chart (2026)	Peak position
Russia Streaming (TopHit)	79

== See also ==
- List of anti-war songs
