= Naum Rogozhin =

Soviet and Russian actor

- Born: Naum Rogozhin; 12 February 1879
- Died: 17 March 1955 (aged 76)
- Occupation: Actor
- Years active: 1924–1945

Naum Rogozhin (Russian: Наум Рогожин) was a Soviet actor. Honored Artist of the RSFSR (1935).

== Biography ==
Naum studied at the Faculty of Law at Kharkov University since 1900 to 1904. Since 1901 he played at the People’s House in Kharkov. Since 1904 he played in the troupe of V.F. Komissarzhevskaya in St. Petersburg, and after that in various theaters of St. Petersburg, Moscow, Kiev and other cities. In 1924 he began acting in films.

== Selected filmography ==
- 1924 — Aelita
- 1936 — Dawn of Paris
- 1938 — Alexander Nevsky
