= Alyosha (song) =

Song by Eduard Kolmanovsky, Konstantin Vanshenkin
- Language: Russian
- Published: 1966
- Genre: Patriotic Song
- Composer: Eduard Kolmanovsky
- Lyricist: Konstantin Vanshenkin

Alyosha (Russian: Алёша) is a Soviet-era Russian song by composer Eduard Kolmanovsky and poet Konstantin Vanshenkin. The subject is the Alyosha Monument, the common local name for the 11-metre (36-foot) statue of a World War II Soviet soldier which stands in the Bulgarian city of Plovdiv as a monument to all Soviet soldiers who died during the fighting in Bulgaria.

== Creation of the song ==
In 1962, Eduard Kolmanovsky visited Bulgaria, including in the city of Plovdiv where the Alyosha monument stands, where he learned the story of its origin. Kolmanovsky later shared his notes with poet Konstantin Vanshenkin, who was inspired by the topic and soon wrote a poem.

Kolmanovsky then composed music for the verses. The mournful feeling of the song is achieved with the minor mood of the music and by the lyric which employs both slow repetition:

If there's a new snowfall in the fields
Snowfall, snowfall
If there's a new snowfall in the fields
Or thunder echoes in the rain
He stands upon the mountain: Alyosha,
Alyosha, Alyosha
He stands upon the mountain, Alyosha
A Russian soldier in our Motherland

and pathos:

Since the blizzard of bullets, his tunic is made now of stone ...
He'll never step down down from his mountain ...
He cannot give flowers to the women, who give their flowers to him

"Alyosha" was published in 1966 in the Soviet army magazine Sergeant Major/Sergeant (Russian: Старшина-сержант) in the section dedicated to Bulgarian-Soviet friendship. In 1967, the Soviet Alexandrov Ensemble first performed the song at the foot of the monument. It was performed at the 1968 Ninth World Festival of Youth and Students in Sofia. The song immediately became very popular in Bulgaria.

In the Soviet Union, the song became popular in a duet by the Bulgarian singers Margret Nikolova and Georgi Kordov.

Until 1989 "Alyosha" was the official anthem of Plovdiv. Every morning Radio Plovdiv started its broadcasts with this song. It was often played during cultural events conducted by the Bulgarian Communist Party, and all Bulgarian primary school students were required to learn it.

The song has also become identified with the Russian monument Defenders of the Soviet Arctic during the Great Patriotic War in Murmansk which is also nicknamed Alyosha, and with other Soviet monuments.

== Notes ==
1. In fact, the Red Army did not fight an extensive campaign in Bulgaria. A new and Soviet-friendly government was established by the Bulgarians themselves almost immediately the Soviets crossed the Bulgarian border and the Red and Bulgarian Armies became allied. While there was scattered and bitter fighting, mostly between Bulgarians, German attempts to hold Bulgaria were relatively desultory and ineffectual and a large Soviet campaign in Bulgaria was not needed. See Bulgarian coup d'état of 1944 and Military history of Bulgaria during World War II.
