= Guy de Maupassant bibliography =

Guy de Maupassant wrote short stories, novels, travel accounts and poetry.

== Short stories ==
=== Short stories published between 1875 and 1880 ===
- Boule de suif
- Coco, coco, coco frais !
- Jadis
- La Main d'écorché
- Le Donneur d'eau bénite
- Le Mariage du lieutenant Laré
- Le Papa de Simon
- Les Dimanches d'un bourgeois de Paris
- Suicides
- Sur l'eau
- Une page d'histoire inédite

=== Short stories published in 1881 ===
- Au printemps
- En famille
- Épaves
- Histoire corse
- Histoire d'un chien
- Histoire d'une fille de ferme
- La Femme de Paul
- La Maison Tellier
- Par un soir de printemps
- Opinion publique
- Une aventure parisienne
- Une partie de campagne

=== Short stories published in 1882 ===
- Autres temps
- Aux champs
- Ce cochon de Morin
- Clair de lune – 1
- Clair de lune – 2
- Confessions d'une femme
- Conflits pour rire
- Conte de Noël
- Correspondance
- En voyage
- Farce normande
- Fou?
- Histoire vraie
- L'Aveugle
- L'Enfant
- La Bécasse
- La Bûche
- La Folle
- La Légende du Mont-Saint-Michel
- La Peur
- La Relique
- La Rempailleuse
- La Roche aux Guillemots
- La Rouille
- La Veillée
- Le Gâteau
- Le Lit
- Le Loup
- Le Pardon
- Le Saut du berger
- Le Testament
- Le Verrou
- Le Voleur
- Le Baiser
- Ma femme
- Madame Baptiste
- Mademoiselle Fifi
- Magnétisme
- Marroca
- Menuet
- Mon oncle Sosthène
- Mots d'amour
- Nuit de Noël
- Pétition d'un viveur malgré lui
- Pierrot
- Rencontre
- Rêves
- Rouerie
- Souvenir
- Un bandit corse
- Un coq chanta
- Un drame vrai
- Un fils
- Un million
- Un Normand
- Un parricide
- Un réveillon
- Un vieux
- Une passion
- Une ruse
- Une veuve
- Vieux Objets
- Voyage de noce
- Yveline Samoris

=== Short stories published in 1883 ===
- Au bord du lit
- À cheval
- Apparition
- Auprès d'un mort
- Décoré !
- Denis
- Deux Amis
- En mer
- En voyage (1883)
- Enragée ?
- Humble Drame
- L'Ami Joseph
- L'Ami Patience
- L'Âne
- L'Attente
- L'Aventure de Walter Schnaffs
- L'Enfant
- L'Homme-fille
- L'Odyssée d'une fille
- L'Orphelin
- La Confession
- La Confession de Théodule Sabot
- La Farce
- La Fenêtre
- La Ficelle
- The Hand / La Main
- La Martine
- La Mère aux monstres
- La Moustache
- La Reine Hortense
- La Serre
- La Toux
- Le Cas de Mme Luneau
- Le Condamné à mort
- Le Mal d'André
- Le Modèle
- Le Pain maudit
- Le Père
- Le Père Judas
- Le Père Milon
- Le Petit
- Le Remplaçant
- Le Vengeur
- Les Bijoux
- Les Caresses
- Les Sabots
- Lui?
- M. Jocaste
- Mademoiselle Cocotte
- Miss Harriet
- Mon oncle Jules
- Première neige
- Regret
- Réveil
- Saint-Antoine
- Tombouctou
- Un coup d'état
- Un duel
- Un sage
- Une soirée
- Une surprise
- Une vendetta

=== Short stories published in 1884 ===
- Adieu
- Berthe
- Bombard
- Coco
- Châli
- Découverte
- Garçon, un bock !...
- Idylle
- L'Abandonné
- L'Aveu
- L'Héritage
- L'Horrible
- La Chambre 11
- La Chevelure
- La Confession
- La Dot
- La Mère Sauvage
- La Parure
- La Patronne
- La Peur
- Le Baptême
- Le Bonheur
- Le Garde
- Le Gueux
- Le Lit 29
- Le Parapluie
- Le Protecteur
- Le Retour
- Le Tic
- Le Vieux
- Lettre trouvée sur un noyé
- Les Idées du colonel
- Les Sœurs Rondoli
- Mohammed-Fripouille
- Misti
- Notes d'un voyageur
- Promenade
- Rencontre
- Rose
- Solitude
- Souvenirs
- Tribunaux rustiques
- Un fou ?
- Un lâche
- Une vente
- Vains Conseils
- Yvette

=== Short stories published in 1885 ===
- À vendre
- Blanc et Bleu
- Ça ira
- En wagon
- Fini
- Imprudence
- La Bête à Maît' Belhomme
- La Confidence
- Le Baptême (1885)
- Le Moyen de Roger
- Le Père Mongilet
- L'Épingle
- Les Bécasses
- Lettre d'un fou
- L'Inconnue
- Mes vingt-cinq jours
- Monsieur Parent
- Nos Anglais
- Petit Soldat
- Sauvée
- Toine
- Un échec
- Un fou
- Une lettre

=== Short stories published in 1886 ===
- Amour
- Au bois
- Clochette
- Cri d'alarme
- Jour de fête
- Julie Romain
- La Question du latin
- L'Auberge
- L'Épave
- L'Ermite
- Le Diable
- Le Fermier
- Le Père Amable
- Le Signe
- Le Trou
- Madame Parisse
- Mademoiselle Perle
- Misère humaine
- Rosalie Prudent
- Sur les chats
- Un cas de divorce
- Une famille
- Voyage de santé

=== Short stories published in 1887 ===
- Comment on cause
- Duchoux
- Étrennes
- L'Assassin
- L'Homme de Mars
- L'Ordonnance
- La Baronne
- La Morte
- La Nuit
- La Porte
- Le Horla
- Le Lapin
- Le Père
- Le Rosier de Madame Husson
- Le Vagabond
- Le Voyage du Horla
- Les Rois
- Madame Hermet
- Moiron
- Une soirée (1887)

=== Short stories published in 1888 ===
- Divorce
- L'Infirme
- Le Noyé
- Les Épingles
- Les 25 Francs de la supérieure
- Nos lettres
- Un portrait

=== Short stories published in 1889 ===
- Alexandre
- Allouma
- Boitelle
- Hautot père et fils
- L'Endormeuse
- L'Épreuve
- L'Ordonnance
- La Main gauche
- Le Masque
- Le Port
- Le Rendez-vous
- Un soir

=== Short stories published in 1890 ===
- Le Champ d'oliviers
- L'Inutile Beauté
- Mouche
- Qui sait ?

=== Short stories published in 1891 and posthumously ===
- Après
- Le Colporteur
- Le Docteur Héraclius Gloss
- Les Tombales

== Short story collections ==
- Les Soirées de Médan (with Zola, Huysmans et al. Contains Boule de Suif by Maupassant) (1880)
- La Maison Tellier (1881)
- Mademoiselle Fifi (1882)
- Contes de la bécasse (1887)
- Miss Harriet (1884)
- Les Sœurs Rondoli (1884)
- Clair de lune (1884) (contains "Les Bijoux")
- Yvette (1884)
- Toine (1885)
- Contes du jour et de la nuit (1885) (contains "La Parure" or "The Necklace")
- Monsieur Parent (1886)
- La Petite Roque (1886)
- Le Horla (1887)
- Le Rosier de Madame Husson (1888)
- La Main gauche (1889)
- L'Inutile Beauté (1890)

== Novels ==
- A Life (1883)
- Bel-Ami (1885)
- Mont Oriol (1887)
- Pierre et Jean (1888)
- Fort comme la mort (1889)
- Notre Cœur (1890)

== Travel writing ==
- Au soleil (1884)
- Sur l'eau (1888)
- La Vie errante (1890)

== Poetry ==
- Des vers (1880)
