= Fifi =

Fifi may refer to:

== Arts and entertainment ==
- Fifi (Better Call Saul), an episode of the TV show
- Fifi (Peanuts), the love interest of Snoopy
- Fifi La Fume, in Tiny Toon Adventures
- Fifi the Peke, a Disney character
- Fifi and the Flowertots, a British children's TV series
- Fifi, a Shrek character
- Fifi, a poodle in Rugrats
- Fifi, a character from Open Season 2
- Fifi Dufus, the main antagonist of No Time to Spy, voiced by Amy Sedaris

== People ==
- Fifi (singer) (Filloreta Raçi, born 1994), Kosovo-Albanian singer and songwriter
- Fifi Abdou (born 1953), Egyptian belly dancer and actress
- Fifi Banvard (1901–1962), Australian actress
- Fifi Box (born 1977), Australian radio broadcaster, comedian, and TV personality
- Fifi Colston (born 1960), artist, author and TV presenter
- Fifi Cooper (born 1991), South African recording artist
- Fifi D'Orsay (1904–1983), Canadian-American actress billed as Mademoiselle Fifi
- Fifi Ejindu (born 1962), Nigerian architect and philanthropist
- Fifi Masuka Saini (born 1967), Congolese politician
- Fifi Mukuna (born 1968), Congolese cartoonist and caricaturist
- Fiifi Kwetey (born 1967), Ghanaian politician
- Fifi Young (1915–1975), Indonesian actress
- Fiore Buccieri (1907–1973), Chicago mobster nicknamed Fifi
- Marie Christine Chilver (1920–2007), secret agent during World War II, code-named "Fifi"
- Ingrid Finger, German beauty queen nicknamed Fifi
- Fifi (Wendy Barlow), "maid" to Ric Flair in WCW in 1993, later his wife

== Places ==
- Fifi, Morocco
- Mount Fifi, Canadian Rockies

== Other uses ==
- Fifi (chimpanzee) (c.1958 – 2004), in the Kasakela chimpanzee community
- Fifi hook, a climbing aid
- Fifi, prison slang for artificial vagina
- Faifi language, or Fifi
- FIFI (aircraft), a Boeing B-29 Superfortress
- HMS Fifi, an 1894 ship of the Royal Navy
- Fifi shipwreck, a submerged shipwreck off Bahrain
- Federation of International Football Independents
- FiFi Awards, in the fragrance industry
- Find It, Fix It, a mobile app for municipal issues in Seattle
- Tropical Storm Fifi, the name of several storms

== See also ==
- Fifie, a design of sailing boat
- Mademoiselle Fifi (disambiguation)
- Michael Fifi'i, Solomon Islands footballer
