= Imprudence (short story) =

- Short story by Guy de Maupassant
- Country: France
- Language: French

Publication
- Published in: Gil Blas
- Publication date: 1885

Chronology
Le Baptême	Un fou

"Imprudence" is a short story by French author Guy de Maupassant, published in 1885.

== History ==
Signed under the name "Maufrigneuse", Imprudence is a short story written by Guy de Maupassant. It was first published in the newspaper Gil Blas on September 15, 1885, before being reprised in the Monsieur Parent collection.

== Synopsis ==
Henriette and Paul are becoming bored of each other after their marriage. Henriette asks Paul to take her to a cabaret where they can have a date...

== Editions ==
- Gil Blas, 1885
- Monsieur Parent - collection published in 1885 by Paul Ollendorff
- Maupassant, contes et nouvelles, volume II, text established and annotated by Louis Forestier, Bibliothèque de la Pléiade, Éditions Gallimard, 1979
