= L'Inconnue =

Short story by French author Guy de Maupassant, published in 1885

- Short story by Guy de Maupassant
- Country: France
- Language: French

Publication
- Published in: Gil Blas
- Publication date: 1885

Chronology
À vendre	La Confidence

"L'Inconnue" is a short story by French author Guy de Maupassant, published in 1885.

== Synopsis ==
On the Pont de la Concorde in Paris, baron Roger des Annettes meets a stranger who has "an effect... an astonishing effect" on him.

== Publication ==
L'Inconnue was first published in the newspaper Gil Blas on January 27, 1885, before being reprised in the Monsieur Parent collection.

== Editions ==
- Gil Blas, 1885
- Monsieur Parent - collection published in 1885 by Paul Ollendorff
- Maupassant, contes et nouvelles, volume II, text established and annotated by Louis Forestier, Bibliothèque de la Pléiade, Éditions Gallimard, 1979
