= La Maison Tellier =

La Maison Tellier may refer to:

- "La Maison Tellier" (short story), an 1881 short story by Guy de Maupassant
  - La Maison Tellier, a 1981 French-Spanish film, directed by Pierre Chevalier
- La Maison Tellier (book), a collection of short stories by Guy de Maupassant
- La Maison Tellier (group), a French musical group founded in 2004
  - La Maison Tellier (album), their self-titled album
