= La Bête à Maît' Belhomme =

- Short story by Guy de Maupassant
- Country: France
- Language: French

Publication
- Published in: Gil Blas
- Publication date: 1885

Chronology
| Monsieur Parent | À vendre |

"La Bête à Maît' Belhomme" is a short story by French author Guy de Maupassant, published in 1885.

== History ==
La Bête à Maît' Belhomme is a short story written by Guy de Maupassant. It was first published in the newspaper Gil Blas on September 22, 1885, before being reprised in the Monsieur Parent collection.

== Synopsis ==
When one is a Norman peasant, it is an adventure to go to town by stagecoach.

That day, in the Le Havre stagecoach, there is the schoolmaster, the priest, Maître Rabot, Maître Caniveau and Maître Belhomme, a tall skinny man who moans while putting a handkerchief on his ear.

Soon, his travel companions will learn that Belhomme is convinced that a beast has entered through his ear and is eating his brain. The trip will be poisoned by this old whiner who makes more and more horrible cries.

But what is this mysterious beast that is gnawing at poor Belhomme, and how will their trip end?

== Editions ==
- Gil Blas, 1885
- Monsieur Parent - collection published in 1885 by the editor Paul Ollendorff
- Maupassant, contes et nouvelles, volume II, text established and annotated by Louis Forestier, Bibliothèque de la Pléiade, Éditions Gallimard, 1979
