= Tribunaux rustiques =

- Short story by Guy de Maupassant
- Country: France
- Language: French

Publication
- Published in: Gil Blas
- Publication date: 1884

Chronology
Un fou	L'Épingle

"Tribunaux rustiques" is a short story by French author Guy de Maupassant, published in 1884.

== History ==
It was first published in the newspaper Gil Blas on November 25, 1884, and signed under the name "Maufrigneuse". In 1885 it was reprised in the Monsieur Parent collection.

== Synopsis ==
In the chamber of the justice of the peace of Gorgeville, which is full of peasants, a judge hears the grievances of Madame Victoire Bascule against Isidore Paturon...

== Editions ==
- Gil Blas, 1884
- Monsieur Parent - collection published in 1885 by Paul Ollendorff
- Maupassant, contes et nouvelles, volume II, text established and annotated by Louis Forestier, Bibliothèque de la Pléiade, Éditions Gallimard, 1979
