= La Confidence =

- Short story by Guy de Maupassant
- Country: France
- Language: French

Publication
- Published in: Gil Blas
- Publication date: 1885

Chronology
L'Inconnue	Le Baptême

"La Confidence" is a short story by French author Guy de Maupassant, published in 1885.

== History ==
La Confidence is a short story written by Guy de Maupassant. It was first published in the periodical Gil Blas on August 20, 1885, before being reprised in the Monsieur Parent collection.

== Synopsis ==
The marquise of Rennedon tells her friend, the baroness of Grangerie, how she just took revenge on her abominable husband.

== Editions ==
- Gil Blas, 1885
- Monsieur Parent – collection published in 1885 by the editor Paul Ollendorff
- Maupassant, contes et nouvelles, volume II, text established and annotated by Louis Forestier, Bibliothèque de la Pléiade, Éditions Gallimard, 1979
