= Mademoiselle Fifi =

Mademoiselle Fifi may refer to:

- Fifi D'Orsay (1904–1983), Canadian-American actress billed as "Mademoiselle Fifi"
- Mademoiselle Fifi (book), a collection of short stories by Guy de Maupassant published in 1882
  - "Mademoiselle Fifi" (short story), a story from the 1882 collection
    - Mademoiselle Fifi (opera), an opera composed by César Cui during 1902–1903; adapted from the short story
    - Mademoiselle Fifi (film), a 1944 film adaptation; based on the short story
- Mademoiselle Fifi (dancer), burlesque dancer
- Mademoiselle Fifi (cat), a cat owned by John Moisant which was his constant companion while flying

== See also ==
- Fifi (disambiguation)
