= Adios Amigos =

Adios Amigos or Adios Amigo may refer to

== Film and television ==
- Adios Amigo (1976 film), an American comedy-western film
- Adios Amigo (2024 film), an Indian Malayalam-language film
- Adios Amigos (film), a 2016 Dutch drama
- Adios Amigos (Entourage), an episode of Entourage

== Music ==
- Adios Amigo (Marty Robbins album), 1977, and the title track
- Adios Amigos (Ramones album), 1995
- Adios Amigo (song), a 1965 song by Jim Reeves

== See also ==
- Adiós (disambiguation)
