= Doudeville =

- Commune
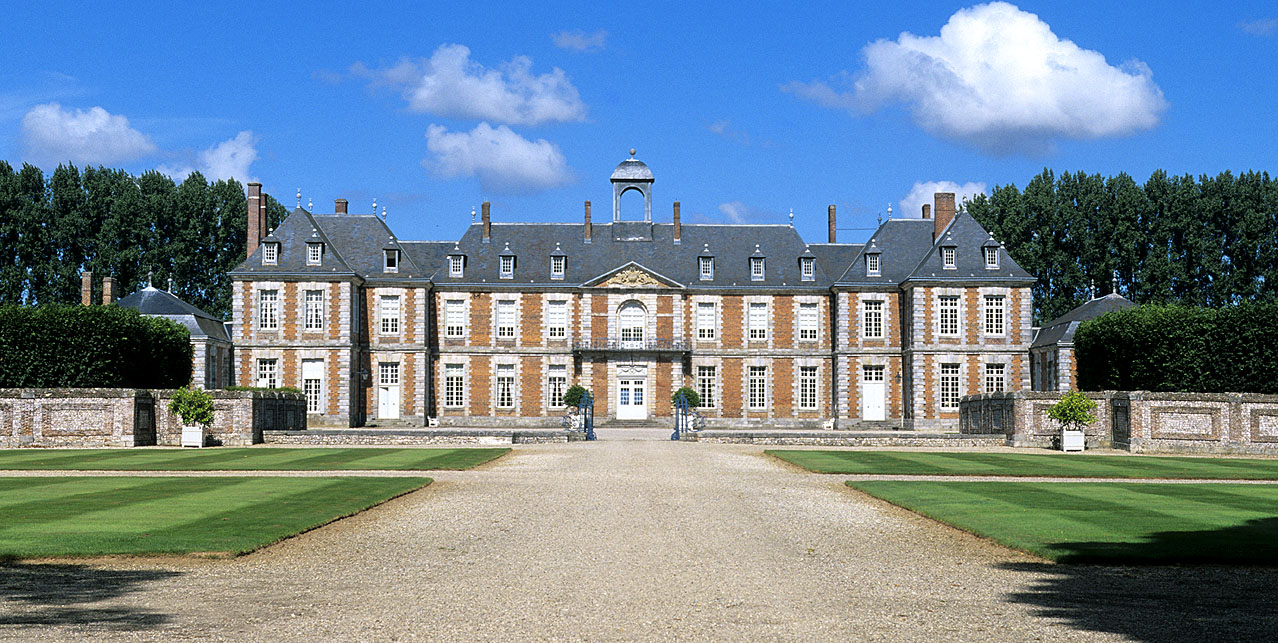
- The château de Galleville

- Coat of arms
- Location of Doudeville
- Location within France Location within Normandy
- Coordinates: 49°43′16″N 0°46′59″E
- Country: France
- Region: Normandy
- Department: Seine-Maritime
- Arrondissement: Rouen
- Canton: Yvetot
- Intercommunality: CC Plateau de Caux

Government
  - Mayor (2026–32): Alain Zam
- Area^{1}: 14.51 km^{2} (5.60 sq mi)
- Elevation: 120 m (390 ft)
- Highest elevation: 156 m (512 ft)
- Lowest elevation: 85 m (279 ft)
- Population (2023): 2,420
  - Density: 167/km^{2} (432/sq mi)
- Time zone: UTC+01:00 (CET)
  - Summer (DST): UTC+02:00 (CEST)
- INSEE/Postal code: 76219 /76560
- ^{1} French Land Register data, which excludes lakes, ponds, glaciers > 1 km^{2} (0.386 sq mi or 247 acres) and river estuaries.

Doudeville (French pronunciation: [dudvil]) is a commune in the Seine-Maritime department in the Normandy region in northern France.

== Geography ==
Called the flax capital, the town is situated at the centre of the Pays de Caux, the chalk plateau in High Normandy and one widely known for its fields of blue-flowered flax.

== Demography ==
Since 1793, the population has varied between 3,792 and 1,993. In the early 21st century, it is 87% of that at the dawn of the nineteenth, when there was more demand for labour on the land.

Historical population

Year	Pop.	±% p.a.
1793	3,025	—
1800	2,957	−0.32%
1806	2,984	+0.15%
1821	2,896	−0.20%
1831	3,172	+0.91%
1836	3,308	+0.84%
1841	3,688	+2.20%
1846	3,792	+0.56%
1851	3,767	−0.13%
1856	3,495	−1.49%
1861	3,622	+0.72%
1866	3,587	−0.19%
1872	3,314	−1.31%
1876	3,207	−0.82%
1881	2,870	−2.20%
1886	2,983	+0.78%
1891	2,907	−0.51%
1896	2,788	−0.83%
1901	2,645	−1.05%

Year	Pop.	±% p.a.
1906	2,537	−0.83%
1911	2,418	−0.96%
1921	2,080	−1.49%
1926	2,130	+0.48%
1931	2,145	+0.14%
1936	2,173	+0.26%
1946	2,152	−0.10%
1954	2,150	−0.01%
1962	2,087	−0.37%
1968	1,993	−0.77%
1975	2,161	+1.16%
1982	2,315	+0.99%
1990	2,492	+0.93%
1999	2,526	+0.15%
2006	2,563	+0.21%
2007	2,567	+0.16%
2012	2,554	−0.10%
2017	2,484	−0.55%
2023	2,420	−0.43%

Source: EHESS and INSEE

== History ==
At Doudeville, the General Assemblies of linen producers were held regularly - which is where the idea of Doudeville's claim to be linen capital arose. In the nineteenth century, there was a trade in linen cloth and canvas; enough to employ 8,000 people in ten businesses in the region.

=== Literary connection ===
Guy de Maupassant set a good number of his stories in this region. "The yard of the farm, enclosed by trees, seemed to sleep ... The shade of the apple trees gathered itself round their feet and the thatched roofs of the buildings at the summit of which grew irises ..." from The Story of a Farm Girl (Histoire d'une fille de ferme) by Guy de Maupassant in his short story collection La Maison Tellier. For more, see Pays de Caux.

In Gustave Flaubert's "Madame Bovary" Charles' father dies in Doudeville following a dinner with old military friends.

=== Heraldry ===
Arms of Doudeville	The arms of Doudeville are blazoned : Azure, a bend sinister, overall 3 sacks of wheat, the bottommost covering a sickle Or, and on a chief gules, 3 bees proper.

== Notable buildings ==
There are castles, manor houses with their dovecotes, majestic churches, little chapels and roadside calvaries carved from sandstone.

- Seventeenth-century church.
- Château de Galleville (1680).
- In the villages around, imposing farms rub shoulders with the workers' and weaver's cottages.
- In the main villages around are the masters' houses of the rich manufacturers and merchants of the nineteenth and twentieth centuries who made their fortunes in the linen trade.
- For manor houses (manoirs), see Pays de Caux.

=== Town hall ===
The Hôtel de Ville is a very large building in the Place du Général de Gaulle which was formerly la Place de l'Hôtel de Ville. It was built in about 1780 by François Louis Leseigneur; lord of Reuville and Galleville. Until the early nineteenth century, this was the trading centre for the linen cloth and siamoise, a cotton cloth which was common in the seventeenth and eighteenth centuries. In 1852, the building was bought by the town and refurbished. At that time, the ground floor was a grain market, a prison and the caretaker's lodging. The first floor housed the places in which the duties of the mayor and of the justices of the peace were carried out. At one time, as in many market halls, the ground floor was not fully enclosed. There were wide arched openings. The square in front of it held several small market buildings where traders such as pork butchers, butchers and shoemakers worked. It has undergone a major refurbishment which was due for completion in September 2007.

== Events ==
- In June, in the season of the blue flowers, the town has its flax (linen) festival.

== Sister Cities ==
- Bad Nenndorf, Lower Saxony, Germany, since 1978
- Bourne in Lincolnshire, England since October 1989

== See also ==
- Communes of the Seine-Maritime department
