= Afloat =

Afloat may refer to:

- Afloat (magazine), Australian magazine
- Afloat (Maupassant) (Sur l'eau), novella by Guy De Maupassant 1888
- Afloat, an English name for Piao album, Mandarin-language album by Zhao Wei
- Afloat, album by The NJE 2017
