= Diary of a Madman (Guy de Maupassant short story) =

- Short story by Guy de Maupassant
- Country: France
- Language: French

Publication
- Published in: Le Gaulois
- Publication date: 1885

Chronology
Imprudence	Tribunaux rustiques

"Diary of a Madman" (French: "Un Fou") is a short story by French author Guy de Maupassant, published in 1885.

== History ==
The short story was first published in the newspaper Le Gaulois on September 2, 1885, before being reprised in the Monsieur Parent collection.

This short story should not be confused with Un fou ?, published in 1884. The 1885 short story begins with the following words:

Il était mort chef d'un haut tribunal...

== Synopsis ==
As secretary to a judge who is said to be an "honest magistrate whose irreproachable life was talked about in every court in France", a lawyer finds a strange journal.

== Editions ==
- Le Gaulois, 1885
- Monsieur Parent - collection published in 1885 by the editor Paul Ollendorff
- Maupassant, contes et nouvelles, volume II, text established and annotated by Louis Forestier, Bibliothèque de la Pléiade, Éditions Gallimard, 1979
