= À vendre =

- Short story by Guy de Maupassant
- Country: France
- Language: French

Publication
- Published in: Gil Blas
- Publication date: 1885

"À vendre" is a short story by French author Guy de Maupassant, published in 1885.

== History ==
À vendre is a short story written by Guy de Maupassant. It was first published in the newspaper Gil Blas on January 5, 1885, before being reprised in the Monsieur Parent collection.

== Synopsis ==
While walking in the surrounds of Quimperlé, the narrator finds a pretty house for sale at the bottom of a narrow, round beach.

== Editions ==
- Gil Blas, 1885
- Monsieur Parent - collection published in 1885 by Paul Ollendorff
- Maupassant, contes et nouvelles, volume II, text established and annotated by Louis Forestier, Bibliothèque de la Pléiade, Éditions Gallimard, 1979
