= Le Baptême =

Le Baptême may refer to:

- Le Baptême (album), an album by -M-
- Le Baptême (short story), a short story by Guy de Maupassant
