= Adieu =

Adieu, a parting phrase in French and Catalan, may refer to:

== Literature ==
- Adieu (short story), an 1830 story by Honoré de Balzac
- Adieu (Maupassant story), 1884 story by Guy de Maupassant

== Film and TV ==
- Adieu (film), a 2003 (released 2004) French film by Arnaud des Pallières starring Michael Lonsdale, Olivier Gourmet and Laurent Lucas

== Music ==
=== Classical ===
- Adieu, a composition for piano by Edward Elgar
- Adieu (Stockhausen), a 1966 composition for wind quintet by Karlheinz Stockhausen
- Adieu, a 1986 composition for string quartet by Bent Sørensen
- Les adieux Beethoven: Piano Sonata No. 26 in E flat major, Op. 81a

=== Albums ===
- Adieu (album), Logan Lynn 2016
- Adieu, album by French singer Michèle Torr 1983

=== Songs ===
- "Adieu" (Jahn Teigen and Anita Skorgan song), the Norwegian entry in the Eurovision Song Contest 1982
- "Adieu" (Cowboy Bebop), a song composed by Yoko Kanno for the anime Cowboy Bebop
- "Adieu", a song by British band Enter Shikari from Take to the Skies, 2007
- "Adieu" (Cœur de pirate song), 2011
- "Adieu", by Eleni Karaindrou from Dust of Time, 2009
- "So Long, Farewell", a song in The Sound of Music that includes the lyrics "Adieu, adieu, adieu / To you and you and you"
- "Adieu" (Rammstein song), a song by German band Rammstein from Zeit, 2022

=== Artist ===
- Adieu, the stage name of Moka Kamishiraishi

== See also ==
- Adiós (disambiguation)
