= Suicides (short story) =

- Short story by Guy de Maupassant
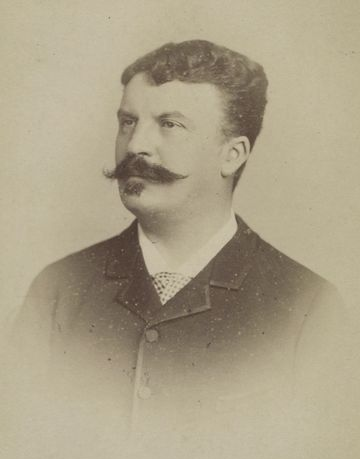
- Guy de Maupassant photo
- Country: France
- Language: French
- Genre: short story

Publication
- Published in: Le Gaulois
- Publication type: Periodical
- Media type: Print
- Publication date: 29 August 1880

Chronology
- Series: Les Sœurs Rondoli
Rencontre	Décoré!

"Suicides" is a short story by French writer Guy de Maupassant. It was originally published on 29 August 1880 in the french newspaper Le Gaulois. On 17 April 1883, it was published in Gil Blas under the pseudonym Maufrigneuse, and by other three periodicals, before being republished in the short story collection Les Sœurs Rondoli in 1884.

== Plot ==
The narrator of the story describes a macabre phenomenon that, according to him, happens on daily basis in France. He explains that every day there is news of a man who committed suicide seemingly for no reason. He then presents a letter from a man who killed himself "for no reason". In the letter, the fifty-seven-year-old narrator describes his life, that is, the monotony and loneliness he has felt for the past 30 years. The evening before his suicide, he starts a task constantly postponed, to store in his desk correspondence and memories of a lifetime. Reading them, he is moved to tears as he recalls old memories of love, friendship, and his childhood. Terrified by the thought that he will spend the rest of his life in "the hideous and lonely old age and the coming infirmities". Overcome by emotions, he shoots himself in the head with a revolver.

== Editions ==
- Suicides, Maupassant, contes et nouvelles, texte établi et annoté par Louis Forestier, Bibliothèque de la Pléiade, éditions Gallimard, 1974, ISBN 978 2 07 010805 3
