= Prudence (disambiguation) =

Prudence is a virtue, the exercising of good judgment or wisdom in practical matters. The opposite is Imprudence.

Prudence may also refer to:

- Prudence (novel), a romance by Jilly Cooper
- Herreshoff Prudence, an American sailboat design
- Prudence (given name)
- Prudent Investment
- Prudence, West Virginia
- Prudence Island, Narragansett Bay, Rhode Island
- Prudence Building, Manhattan, New York
- Prudence Millinery, a hatmaker
- Convention of conservatism, also called prudence, a qualitative characteristic in accounting.

== See also ==
- Imprudence (short story)
- Imprudence (horse)
