= CivicPlus =

Web development company

- Type: Private
- Industry: Web development & Mobile applications
- Founded: 1998
- Founder: Thomas Oliver
- Headquarters: Manhattan, Kansas, United States,
- Key people: Ward Morgan, Tony Gagnon
- Website: www.civicplus.com

CivicPlus is an American company headquartered in Manhattan, Kansas, that specializes in city government communication. It was first developed by programming company Vanyon, a division of Networks Plus Foundership community.

Its current parent company, Icon Enterprises Inc, began doing business in 2010.

== Acquisitions ==
In January 2017, CivicPlus acquired Rec1, a parks and reaction product. In October, it acquired BoardSync, an agenda and meeting-management product. In July 2018, CivicPlus acquired Virtual Towns & Schools, an open-source content management system. In October 2019, CivicPlus acquired SeeClickFix, a 311 citizen request tool.

In April 2021, CivicPlus acquired Municode (Municipal Code Corporation), a company that hosts codes for local governments.

In June 2022, CivicPlus finalized the acquisition of Optimere, a digital compliance provider which products include, ArchiveSocial, NextRequest, and Monsido.

== Websites developed ==
As of 2019, CivicPlus had helped design or augment over 4,000 local government websites. Several localities have hired the company:

- Anaheim, California
- Cheyenne, Wyoming
- East Grand Forks, Minnesota
- Eugene, Oregon
- Flower Mound, Texas
- Garden City, New York
- Manassas, Virginia
- Passaic County, New Jersey
- Watertown, Massachusetts
- Narragansett, Rhode Island
- Princeton, Texas

== Company products ==
CivicPlus products include the Citizen Request Tracker, the CivicPlus Content Management System, and the CivicReady Mass Notification system.

In 2020, CivicPlus launched CivicOptimize, a suite focused on a low-code tool called "Productivity." Government IT personnel familiar with manual coding can generate customized workflows, mobile applications, and integrations for digital resource platforms.
