= La Maison Tellier (short story) =

1881 short story by Guy de Maupassant

"La Maison Tellier" is a short story by Guy de Maupassant published in 1881 in a series of short stories under the same title. Built around a prostitution theme, it is considered one of his best realist short stories, after his renowned Boule de Suif.

The short story was republished in various publications notably in La Lanterne magazine in February 1889 and in the periodical Gil Blas in October 1892.

== Subject ==
"Madame" Julia Tellier, a well-known procuress who runs a whorehouse in Normandy, takes her girls on an outing to her brother's village to attend the confirmation of her niece Constance. Her regular patrons are taken aback when they discover the whorehouse is "closed" without explanation that weekend. They finally discover the announcement explaining the reason. Meanwhile, Joseph Rivet, Madame Tellier's brother, is entertaining a more sinister idea far beyond the religious festivity...

== In popular culture ==
There have been a number of important adaptations of the short story:

- 1952: La Maison Tellier was used as part of Le Plaisir, a French film by Max Ophüls (95 minutes), with Madeleine Renaud, Jean Gabin and Danielle Darrieux. The film is a trilogy of three Maupassant stories.
- 1964: It was used in Un commerce tranquille, a Swiss film by Met Welles and Guido Franco
- 1981: La Maison Tellier, a French-Spanish joint film by director Pierre Chevalier (103 minutes)
- 2008: La Maison Tellier, a French TV film by Élisabeth Rappeneau (90 minutes)

The French musical group La Maison Tellier derives its name from the Maupassant story.

== Editions ==
- La Maison Tellier in Maupassant, contes et nouvelles, notes by Louis Forestier, Gallimard publishers, Bibliothèque de la Pléiade, 1974.
