= Useless Beauty =

- Short story by Guy de Maupassant

Text available at Wikisource
- Original title: Useless Beauty
- Country: United States
- Language: English
- Genre: Short story

Publication
- Publisher: Alfred A. Knopf in New York.
- Publication date: 1926
- Published in English: 1926

"Useless Beauty" is a short story by the French writer Guy de Maupassant. The story was featured in Original Short Stories Volume 6 of 13 published by Alfred A. Knopf in New York in 1926.

== Summary ==
"Useless Beauty" is the story of Countess de Mascaret and her husband, Count de Mascaret. During their eleven-year marriage they’ve had seven children and the countess has fallen deaf to pointless flattery from her husband. The Countess feels as though her husband loves her only because he asserts claim over her youth and her life, over her ability to have children. But the Countess harbors a dark secret: one of the seven children is not his. She confesses her indiscretion at the altar of a church and leaves the Count in the church while she returns home. Throughout the story, the Count wants to know which child is not his, but the Countess refuses to tell – she uses the tension between the two of them to emphasize the absurdity of beauty while she has one child after the next. In the end the Countess reverses her confession and discloses that she said it to prevent herself from becoming a baby factory. (Summary, with permission, by author C. B. Carter)
