= Le Baptême (short story) =

- Short story by Guy de Maupassant
- Country: France
- Language: French

Publication
- Published in: Gil Blas
- Publication date: 1885

"Le Baptême" is a short story by the French author Guy de Maupassant. The story was published in 1885.

== History ==
It was first published in the newspaper Gil Blas on 13 January 1885, before being reprised in the Monsieur Parent collection.

This text should not be confused with a short story of the same name which was published in 1884. This story begins with the following words:

Allons, docteur, un peu de cognac...

== Synopsis ==
The story is about an old navy doctor who lives in a country house near Pont-l'Abbé. His gardener, Kérandec, has asked the doctor to be the godfather to his son. On 2 January, they set off to the church.

== Editions ==
- Gil Blas, 1885
- Monsieur Parent - collection published in 1885 by Paul Ollendorff
- Maupassant, contes et nouvelles, volume II, text established and annotated by Louis Forestier, Bibliothèque de la Pléiade, Éditions Gallimard, 1979
