= Municipal Code Corporation =

Former legal publishing company

- Founded: March 21, 1951
- Founder: George Langford
- Defunct: August 2021; 4 years ago
- Successor: CivicPlus
- Country of origin: United States
- Headquarters location: Tallahassee, Florida
- Publication types: Codifier of legal documents
- Official website: municode.com

Municipal Code Corporation (Municode) was a codifier of legal documents for local governments in the United States. The company, founded in 1951 by George Langford was located in Tallahassee, Florida.

== History ==
George Langford founded Municode Code Corporation on March 21, 1951. Langford served in World War II as a sergeant in the Corps of Engineers. After the war, he went to college and earned a law degree from the University of Virginia. His first job was at a legal publishing company and founded Municode. He founded the company with the idea of making the code of ordinances loose leaf so that new ordinances could be added without having to reprint the entire volume. The Municode Code Corporation's first client was the city of Tallahassee, Florida.

In August 2021, CivicPlus announced they have acquired the company. At the time of its acquisition, the company served over 4,200 municipalities in 50 states.
