= SeeClickFix =

US digital communications system company

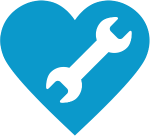
- Type: Subsidiary
- Industry: Information technology
- Founded: September 2008
- Founders: Ben Berkowitz; Kam Lasater; Jeff Blasius; Miles Lasater
- Fate: Acquired
- Headquarters: 770 Chapel Street, 3rd Floor, New Haven, Connecticut, United States
- Key people: Ben Berkowitz (CEO)
- Parent: CivicPlus
- Website: www.seeclickfix.com

SeeClickFix was a digital communications system company founded and based in downtown New Haven, Connecticut. The company runs a website and app which assist users in communicating with local governments about non-emergency issues. SeeClickFix was established in 2008, with co-founder Ben Berkowitz as chief executive officer. The company was acquired by CivicPlus in 2019.

== Website ==
SeeClickFix is an issue reporting platform which allows people to report non-emergency neighborhood issues to local government bodies, assisting city staff. The tool has a free mobile app that maps user comments. Users may add comments, suggest courses of action, or add video and picture documentation. Users can receive notifications based on selected areas and keywords.

The site also allows anonymous reporting to file complaints against others which may lead to someone being cited, arrested, fined, or towed.

This has led to concerns by some that SeeClickFix.com is enabling a culture of snitching that tends to disproportionately target the homeless and other poor and marginalized people.

News outlets following stories from SeeClickFix have prompted responses from local government.

According to the company, about 300 municipalities subscribed to it in 2017.

== See also ==
- 3-1-1, U.S. non-emergency service telephone number
- Find It, Fix It, a municipal customer service application developed for the city of Seattle
