= La Maison Tellier (short story collection) =

1881 collection of short stories by Guy de Maupassant

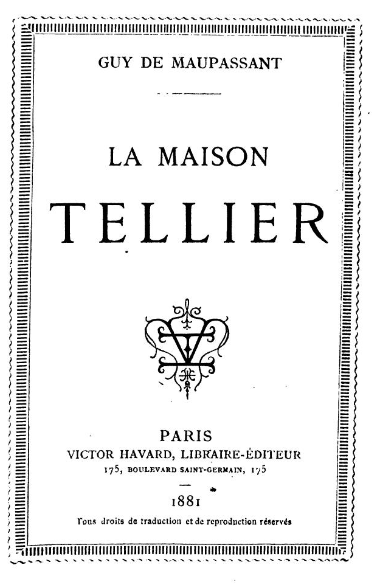
- Title page for La Maison Tellier (1881)
- Author: Guy de Maupassant
- Language: French
- Genre: Short story
- Published: 1881
- Publisher: Victor Havard, Paul Ollendorff
- Publication place: France
- Media type: Print

La Maison Tellier is a collection of short stories by Guy de Maupassant that includes the eponymous story. The book established Maupassant as a prominent French writer following the success of his first short story, "Boule de suif". Five of the eight stories in the collection had already been published in various magazines, like Revue politique et littéraire and La Vie Moderne, and three were originals.

The introduction includes a dedication that reads: "À Ivan Tourgueniev, hommage d'une affection et d'une grande admiration" (translated as "To Ivan Turgenev, an homage of affection and great admiration". The two writers had met in 1876 through a mutual friend, Gustave Flaubert.

== Publication ==
The collection was first published in 1881, by Victor Havard. It was also republished in an augmented edition a decade later, by Paul Ollendorff. The new edition included an additional story, titled "Les Tombales".

== Contents ==
- "La Maison Tellier" (previously unpublished)
- "Sur l'eau" (1876) – originally En Canot, not the same as the 1886 novella of the same name
- "Histoire d'une fille de ferme" (1881)
- "En famille" (1881)
- "Le Papa de Simon" (1879)
- "Une partie de champagne" (1881)
- "Au printemps" (previously unpublished)
- "La Femme de Paul" (previously unpublished)
- "Les Tombales" (only included in 1891 edition)
