= Adiós =

Adiós (Spanish: 'goodbye') or Adios may refer to:

== Music ==
=== Albums ===
- Adios (Böhse Onkelz album), 2004
- Adiós (Flans album), 1990
- Adiós (Glen Campbell album), the final album by Glen Campbell, 2017
- Adios (KMFDM album), 1999
- Adios: The Greatest Hits, the final album by Christian rock band Audio Adrenaline

=== Songs ===
- "Adiós" (Ricky Martin song), 2014
- "Adiós" (María Becerra song), 2023
- "Adiós", a song by Alejandra Guzmán from the album A + No Poder
- "Adiós", a song by Allison from Memorama
- "Adios" a song by Benjamin Clementine
- "Adios!", a song by BoyNextDoor from their first studio album Home
- "Adiós", a song by Don Omar
- "Adios", a song composed by Enric Madriguera, performed instrumentally by Glenn Miller Orchestra, Billy May, and others
- "Adios", a song by Everglow from their second single album Hush
- "Adiós", a song by Glen Campbell from Adiós
- "Adiós", a song by Gustavo Cerati from the album Ahí vamos
- "Adiós", a song by Jesse & Joy from their studio album Electricidad
- "Adiós", a song by Juan Gabriel from his studio album Siempre en Mi Mente
- "Adiós", a song by Kany García from her eponymous album
- "Adiós", a song by La Oreja de Van Gogh from their album Lo Que te Conté Mientras te Hacías la Dormida
- "Adios", a song by Linda Ronstadt from Cry Like a Rainstorm, Howl Like the Wind
- "Adios", a song by Migos from Y.R.N. (Young Rich Niggas)
- "Adios", a song by Nellie McKay from the album Home Sweet Mobile Home
- "Adiós", a song by Rammstein from the album Mutter
- "Adiós", a song by RBD from their last studio album Para Olvidarte de Mí
- "Adiós", a song by Rocío Dúrcal from the album Confidencias
- "Adiós", a song by Slapshock from the album Silence
- "Adiós", a song by Sebastián Yatra
- "Adiós", a song by Selena Gomez from the extended play Revelación
- "Adios", a song by Twelve Foot Ninja from the album Outlier

== Other uses ==
- Adios (horse), a champion harness racing sire
- Adiós, Navarre, a place in Spain

== See also ==
- Adieu (disambiguation)
- Goodbye (disambiguation)
