= La Maison Tellier (group) =

French rock band

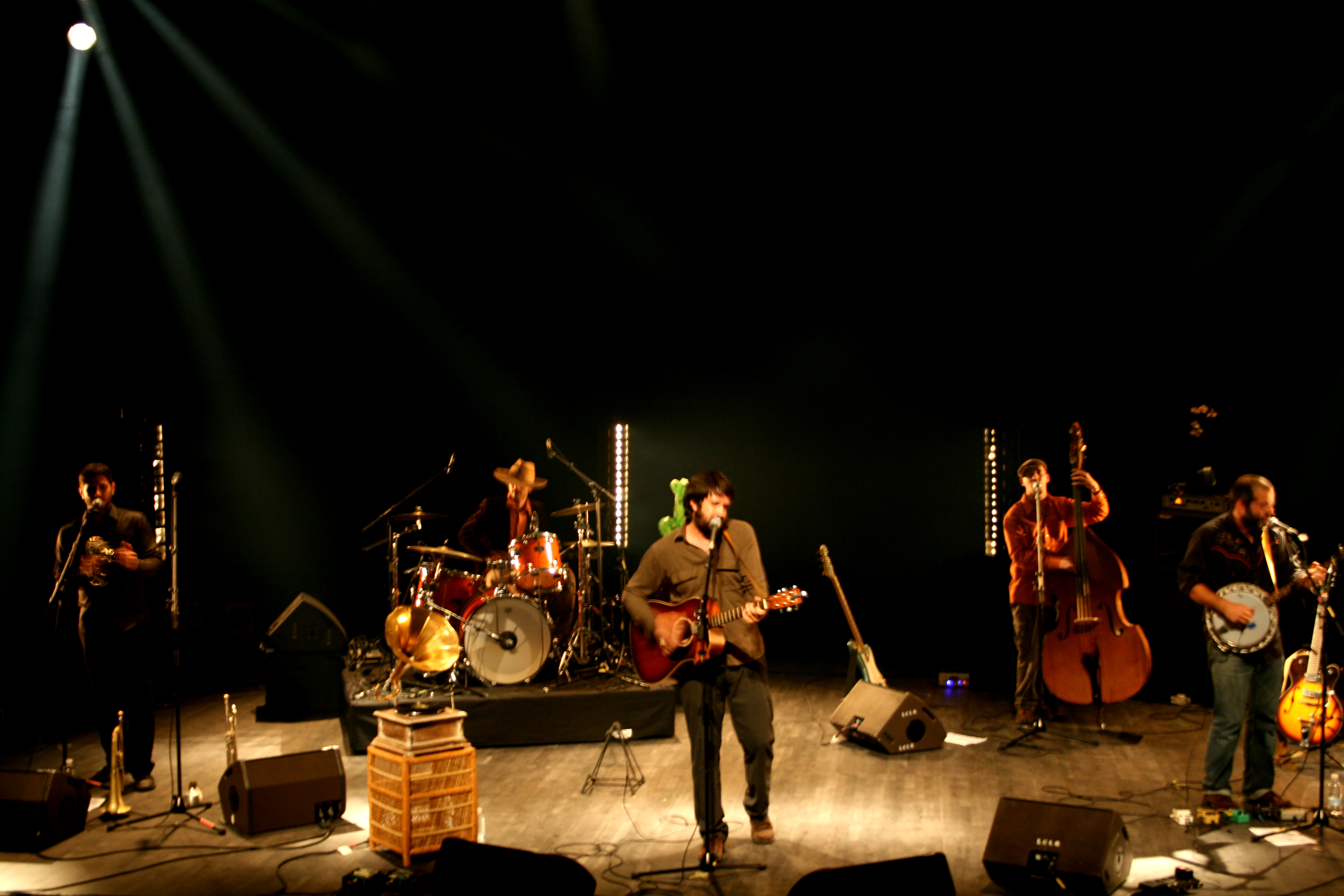
- La Maison Tellier performing in 2008

Background information
- Origin: France
- Genres: Folk rock
- Years active: 2004 to present
- Labels: Euro-Visions; Troisième Bureau
- Members: Raoul Tellier; Helmut Tellier
- Website: lamaisontellier.fr

La Maison Tellier is a French rock group with American country and folk influences, founded in 2004 by Raoul and Helmut Tellier. The group have released three studio albums, performing in both French and English.

== History ==
Formed in 2004 by Raoul and Helmut Tellier, the group's name was derived from a Guy de Maupassant story of the same name. Their first release was a cover of Rage Against the Machine's "Killing in the Name" on a compilation album Travaux Publics in 2006. They would later go onto release their first album La Maison Tellier in that year. They toured from late 2006 to early 2007 and released their second album Second Souffle in 2007 on the Euro-Visions label.

Their third album, L'Art de la Fugue, was released in 2010 via the Troisième Bureau label. The album incorporated "American traditions" and reached position 84 of the French album charts.

== Discography ==
Year	Album	Peak positions	Certification
Year	Album	FR	Certification
2006	La Maison Tellier	–	
2007	Second Souffle	–	
2010	L'Art de la Fugue	84	
2013	Beauté pour tous	120	
2016	Avalanche	89	
2019	Primitifs Modernes	–	
2022	Atlas	–	
2026	Timidité des arbres	–	
