= The Piece of String =

- Short story by Guy de Maupassant
- Country: France
- Language: French, English
- Genre: Short story

Publication
- Publisher: Victor Havard
- Publication date: 1883
- Published in English: 1889

"The Piece of String" (French: La Ficelle) is an 1883 short story by Guy de Maupassant. It is included in the short story collection Miss Harriet.

== Plot ==
On market day in the French town of Goderville, among those present were a Maître Hauchecorne and his enemy Maître Malandain. While walking along, Maître Hauchecorne saw a piece of string in the road and thought that he could make use of it in the future, and so bent to pick it up. He noticed, however, Maître Malandain was watching, and he knew that he would be embarrassed if Malandain saw him picking up a small string, so the proud Hauchecorne acted as if he were searching for something. That day, news came out that someone lost his wallet. Quickly, Maître Malandain accused Maître Hauchecorne of stealing the wallet, and the town believed him, despite Hauchecorne's innocence. The town of Goderville did not believe Maître Hauchecorne was innocent, even though someone found the wallet in the street and returned it. In irony, Maître Hauchecorne died of a broken heart, despairing of being thought a liar.
