= Find It, Fix It =

Mobile app for Seattle, Washington, USA

Find It, Fix It is a mobile app developed by the city of Seattle to report non-emergency issues.

== History ==
The City of Seattle launched Find It, Fix It in 2013 for Android and iOS phones to let citizens report potholes, graffiti, and other problems they observe to the city. The app did not support Windows Phone, making it inaccessible to Microsoft employees in the city who used the company's then-supported mobile operating system.

In 2015, Mayor Ed Murray led a Find It, Fix It walk with about 100 other people, including police officers, in the University District. Participants were encouraged to use the app to report problems they observed in the neighborhood. Later Find It, Fix It walks have taken place in neighborhoods including Crown Hill, First Hill, Belltown, Wallingford, and Highland Park.

In 2020, Find It, Fix It added support for reporting issues with the dockless bicycle sharing systems in the city.

Citing the success of Seattle’s app, the nearby city of Kent, Washington, announced in 2019 that it would create a similar customer service app.

== Usage ==
Users of Find It, Fix It can submit reports about graffiti, potholes, parking violations, broken street signs, and other issues. The app is designed to use a smartphone’s camera and GPS features to make it easier for users to file reports.

The Atlantic reported in 2018 that Find It, Fix It was being used by neighborhood groups to report homeless encampments with the intention of having authorities remove them, citing examples of campaigns in Ravenna and Ballard. The executive director of Ballard Alliance, a local chamber of commerce for businesses in the neighborhood, used a private Facebook group to encourage business owners to use the app to report homeless encampments. In response to a poster campaign in the summer of 2019 with the slogan “See a tent? Report a tent”, a representative for the mayor’s office and two Seattle City Council members said that it was inappropriate to encourage use of Find It, Fix It to displace homeless people. As a backlash to these campaigns, people living far from Seattle filed hoax complaints using the app, such as by using photos of tents on display at REI stores.

According to the Seattle Times, between January 1, 2020, and November 15, 2021, the city had received over 230,000 service requests, of which 77% were submitted via Find It, Fix It. The largest category of these, numbering over 55,000, concerned illegal dumping. Of complaints categorized as "parking", 3,000 had comments explicitly mentioning issues around homelessness. The ZIP code 98134, covering an industrial area south of Pioneer Square and north of Georgetown, had 5,559 service requests per 1,000 residents, by far the highest in the city.

== See also ==
- 3-1-1, a phone number used in some cities for non-emergency issues
- SeeClickFix, a website and app for non-emergency issues
