= List of storms named Fifi =

The name Fifi has been used for five tropical cyclones worldwide: two in the Atlantic Ocean, one in the South-West Indian Ocean, and two in the Australian region.

In the Atlantic:

- Hurricane Fifi (1958) – paralleled the Lesser Antilles without making landfall
- Hurricane Fifi (1974) – a devastating system that killed thousands in Honduras

The name Fifi was retired after the 1974 season.

In the South-West Indian:

- Cyclone Fifi (1977)

In the Australian region:

- Cyclone Daphne–Fifi (1982)
- Cyclone Fifi (1991) – killed 29 in Western Australia
