= La Peur (short story) =

Short story by Guy de Maupassant

"La Peur" is the title of two short stories by Guy de Maupassant.

The better known of the two was first published in the October 23, 1882 issue of Le Gaulois, and later included in Contes de la bécasse in 1887. In this story, travellers on a boat bound for Africa relate incidents of fear.

The second short story was published in Le Figaro in 1884. It follows a man walking alone at night on an empty road.
