= Mother Savage =

"Mother Savage" (original title: "La Mère Sauvage") is a short story by the French realist writer Guy de Maupassant. It was first published on 3 March 1884.

== Plot ==
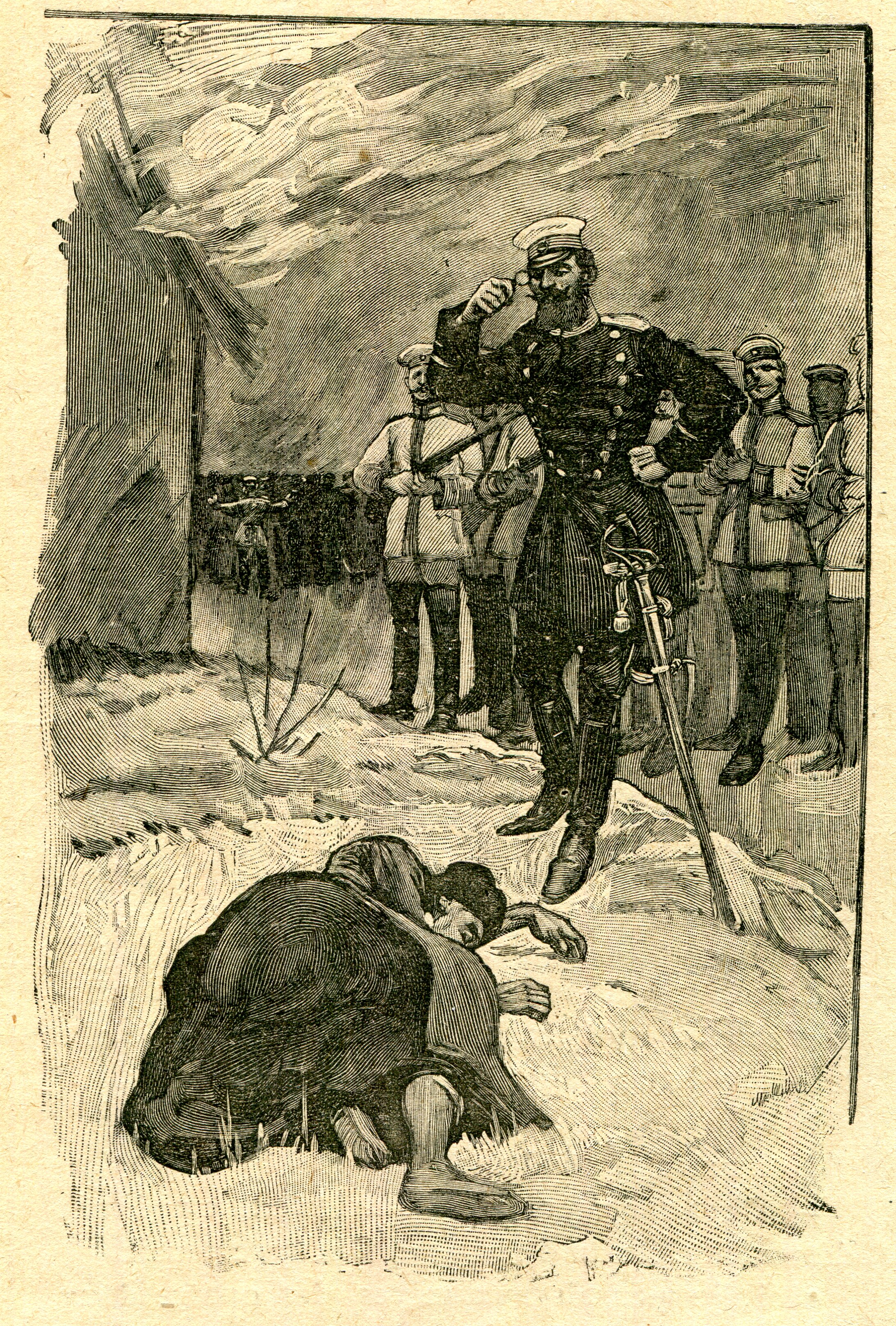

Two men are out hunting in the French countryside, the narrator and Serval. The latter tells the story of the Sauvage family: the father was killed by police with a gunshot to the head. Serval goes on to tell the story of Old Mother Sauvage and her son, who volunteered at age 33 to fight in the war. Mother Sauvage, isolated far from the village and "known to have money" was assigned to quarter four young Prussian soldiers. The men do chores around the house as if it were their own. Mother Sauvage continually asks the young men about the French 23rd Regiment of the Line, where her son is on the front, but the young Prussians know nothing.

Later, the postman gives Mother Sauvage a letter from one of her son's comrades-in-arms which informs her of her son's death. The Prussians bring home a live rabbit for a meal which they killed brutally in the eyes of Mother Sauvage. As she finishes the preparation of the meal, she asks the young men for their names and home addresses. Mother Sauvage does not partake in the meal, and as they finish dinner, she insists on providing the young soldiers with hay to make their stay in the loft more comfortable. After the soldiers fall asleep, Mother Sauvage removes the ladder from the loft and starts a fire in the fireplace, which does not rage out of control until she stokes the fire with more hay. Mother Sauvage stands outside with her son's rifle to make sure the Prussians cannot escape. She hears their "clamor of human screams" and stands guard. Then when she is sure the Prussians are dead, she throws the rifle into the fire, and one loud shot goes off.

The other villagers and soldiers rush to her home, and a German officer interrogates Mother Sauvage. She informs him that the soldiers were in the fire and that she started the fire. She hands the officer the list of names and addresses she had gathered and is immediately pushed against her home and shot "almost in two", with the letter informing her of her son's death bloody in her hand.

== Analysis of narrator ==
The story is written from the perspective of the narrator, who retells the Mother Savage story as told by his friend Serval. Influenced by Gustave Flaubert, Guy de Maupassant writes in the realist style which focuses on objective reality and "shows" instead of "tells".

== Setting ==
The story is set during the winter of 1871 midway through the Franco-Prussian War in a quaint village in the French countryside. Snow covers the fields, and the forest lurks ominously, void of life. The countryside is dotted with small cottages emitting smoke from chimneys.
