= Fifi Mukuna =

Congolese draughtsperson

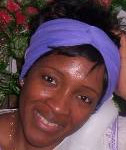
- Fifi Mukuna
- Born: 1968 (age 57–58); Kinshasa, Zaire (now Democratic Republic of the Congo)
- Occupation: Cartoonist

Fifi Mukuna (born 1968) is a Congolese cartoonist and caricaturist.

== Biography ==
Fifi Mukuna was born in Kinshasa in Zaire, now the Democratic Republic of the Congo, in 1968. Her father was a diplomat. She attended elementary school in Belgium, where her father was assigned, and became a fan of Bob et Bobette, a comic series created by Willy Vandersteen. She became interested in drawing, and on her return to Zaire she studied at the Académie des Beaux-Arts in Kinshasa in 1989.

After graduating, Mukuna began contributing political caricatures to various newspapers and magazines including Le Palmarès, Le Phare, and Le Grognon, working closely with popular Congolese artists and graphic designers. Of her work as a caricaturist for Le Phare, she has said, "It was dangerous, but I enjoyed it a lot." Some of this work was published under a pseudonym, and many readers assumed she was a man, which protected her when authorities on one occasion came to the newspaper office to pressure the artists not to draw.

She also published comic strips in the journal of the Franco-Congolese Alliance, a Congolese nonprofit association operating in partnership with the Alliance Française in Paris. Mukuna received further training through workshops organized by the Centre Wallonie-Bruxelles. In 2001, she contributed to a collection of work by African authors, À l'ombre du baobab, in which she focused on the lives of street children.

Concerned about increasing backlash to her caricatures after the government discovered her identity, Mukuna left her country in 2002 and settled in France. She received political refugee status, and her children were able to come live with her in France, but her husband who had stayed behind in Kinshasa died before he was able to join her.

In France, Mukuna resumed her work as a comic book author. She contributed to the third issue of Afrobulles, the publication of the collective of the same name led by another Congolese cartoonist, Alix Fuili, as well as three other collections: Une journée dans la vie d'un africain d'Afrique, Là-bas ... Na poto, and New Arrivals. She also contributed to the Italian magazine Linus, in collaboration with the writer Christophe Ngalle Edimo, and participated in the exhibition Matite africane. She also collaborated with Edimo on an adaptation of a story by Carl Norac on the theme of water and ecology. In 2005 she published the comic Si tu me suis autour du monde. She published her first solo graphic novel, Kisi le Collier, in 2013.

Beyond producing her own work, Mukuna teaches, including at the Higher Regional School of Visual Art in Tourcoing. She is also a cultural ambassador for the Alliance Française and the Red Cross.
