= Mademoiselle Fifi (short story collection) =

Mademoiselle Fifi

Mademoiselle Fifi is a collection of short stories by Guy de Maupassant published in 1882. The stories are:

- "Mademoiselle Fifi"
- "The Practical Joker"
- "The Door"
- "The Hair"
- "Our Letters"
- "Queen Hortense"
- "Moonlight"
- "The Father"
- "The Coup d'État"
- "Bed Twenty-Nine"
- "The Jewels"
- "The Baby"
- "The Umbrella"
- "The Family Circle"
- "A Question of Latin"
- "A Sign"
- "Sound the Alarm"
- "Clochette"
- "The Legend of St Michael's Mount"
- "Mademoiselle Cocotte"
- "Forgiveness"
- "My Twenty-five Days"
- "Horrible"
- "Boule de Suif"
- "Finished"
