= Abel Hermant =

French writer (1861–1950)

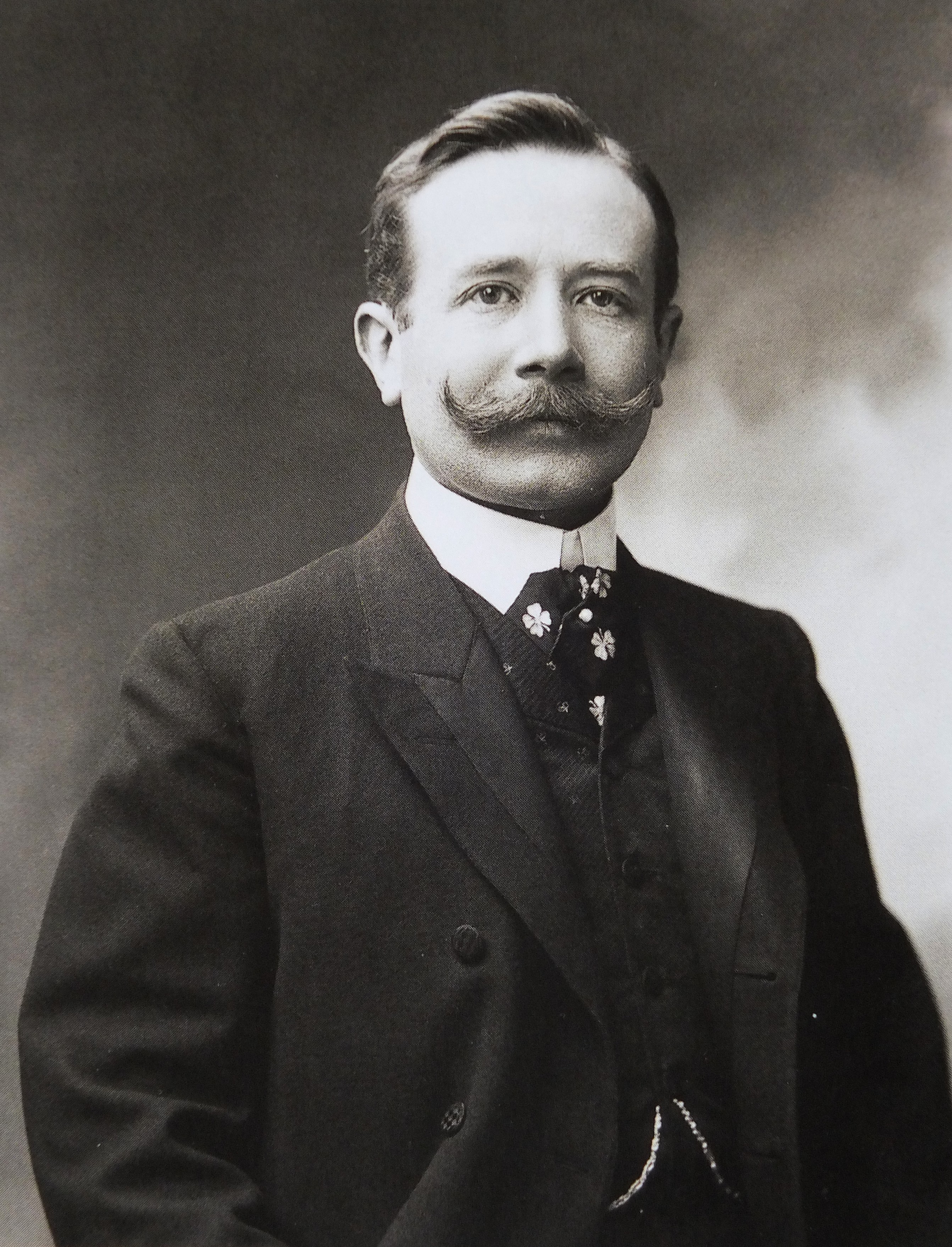
Abel Hermant, 1903

Abel Hermant (French: [abɛl ɛʁmɑ̃]; 3 February 1862 – 29 September 1950) was a French novelist, playwright, essayist and writer, and member of the Académie française.

== Life and career ==
Hermant was born in Paris, the son of architect Achille Hermant (1823-1903). His half-brother was the architect Jacques Hermant. He entered the highly selective École Normale Supérieure in 1880, where he was a friend and classmate of René Doumic and Jean Jaurès. He published his first volume of verse in 1883, The Contempt. After several youthful novels, he moved to ironic analysis of the popular mores of the Belle Époque and achieved popular success. His first semi-autobiographical novel, Monsieur Rabosson of 1884, established his reputation as a satirical social observer. Its follow-up Le Cavalier Miserey of 1887, scandalised France for its depiction of the military at a time the French Republic, surrounded by monarchies, was preparing to take revenge (la Revanche) on the German Reich. One of key characters is a royal prince who is accused of anti-republican behaviour by the Radical-Socialist government of the day, and demoted as colonel of the light cavalry regiment wherefrom the main character, a weak young man, goes AWOL with his captain's wife. The colonel de Vermandois is possibly based loosely on the life of Prince de Joinville.

Between 1901 and 1937 Hermant embarked on a series of 20 linked novels with the general title Memoirs to Serve for a History of Society, but his contributions to literature included many popular plays, drama criticism for Le Figaro and Gil Blas, and a series of grammarian articles for Le Temps under the name "Lancelot" defending the purity of the French language.

By 1899 Hermant was well-connected in society; for instance he was the guest of Anna de Noailles at Évian-les-Bains, where he became friends with Marcel Proust. After a number of tries Hermant was elected to the Académie française on 30 June 1927.

During World War II Hermant's contributions to Jean Luchaire's pro-Nazi evening daily newspaper Les Nouveaux Temps, beginning in 1940, his membership in Groupe Collaboration, his open support of the Vichy regime, and his criticisms of the French Army, marked him as a collaborator. At over 80 years of age, he was sentenced to life in prison on 15 December 1945. Hermant achieved the negative distinction of being one of the four "immortals" removed from the Académie française after World War II for collaboration with Germany. Hermant and Abel Bonnard were expelled outright, in disgrace; Charles Maurras of Action Française and Marshal of France Philippe Pétain had their seats declared vacant and were not replaced until their deaths.

Pardoned and released in 1948, Abel Hermant tried to justify his conduct during the Occupation in his Thirteenth Notebook. He died shortly thereafter.

== Works ==
- Ermeline—1796 (1882–1890)
- Les Mépris (1883)
- M. Rabosson (l'éducation universitaire) (1884)
- La Mission de Cruchod (Jean-Baptiste) (1885)
- Le Cavalier Miserey (1887)
- Nathalie Madoré (1888)
- Amour de tête (1890)
- Cœurs à part (1890)
- Les Confidences d'une aïeule (1893)
- Le Disciple aimé (1895)
- Le Frisson de Paris (1895)
- La Meute (1896)
- Les Transatlantiques (1897)
- Le Faubourg (1899)
- Sylvie ou la Curieuse d'amour (1890)
- Confession d'un homme d'aujourd'hui (1901–1929)
- L'Archiduc Paul (1902)
- L'Esbroufe (1904)
- La Belle Madame Héber (1905)
- Chaîne anglaise (1906)
- Monsieur de Courpière (1907)
- Les Affranchis (1908)
- Mémoires pour servir à l'histoire de la société. Chronique du cadet de Coutras (1909)
- Le Premier Pas (1910)
- La fameuse comédienne (1913)
- Madame (1914)
- Histoire amoureuse de Fanfan (1917)
- Le crépuscule tragique (1921)
- Le Cycle de Lord Chelsea (1923)
- Xavier ou Les entretiens sur la grammaire française (1923)
- Les Fortunes de Ludmilla (1924)
- Les Confidences d'une biche (1924)
- Les noces vénitiennes (1924)
- Camille aux cheveux courts (1927)
- Le Nouvel Anacharsis. Promenade au jardin des lettres grecques (1928)
- Affaires de cœur (1934)
- Poppée, l'Amante de l'Antéchrist (1935)
- Une vie, trois guerres—Témoignages et souvenirs (1943)
- Le Treizième Cahier: rêveries et souvenirs d'un philosophe proscrit (1949)
