= Adios Amigo (Marty Robbins album) =

Studio album by Marty Robbins
- Released: 1977
- Studio: CBS (Nashville, Tennessee)
- Genre: Country
- Label: Columbia Records
- Producer: Billy Sherrill (tracks A1-A4, B1-B3, B5)

Adios Amigo is a studio album by country music singer Marty Robbins. It was released in 1977 by Columbia Records.

The album debuted on Billboard magazine's Top Country Albums chart on March 5, 1977, peaked at No. 5, and remained on the chart for 18 weeks. The album included two Top 10 singles: "Adios Amigo" (No. 4) and "I Don't Know Why (I Just Do)" (No. 10). It was Robbins' last album to break into the Top 20 on the top Country Albums chart.

== Track listing ==
Side A

1. "Adios Amigo"
2. "18 Yellow Roses"
3. "Falling Out of Love"
4. "I've Never Loved Anyone More"
5. "Helen"

Side B

1. "I Don't Know Why (I Just Do)"
2. "My Happiness"
3. "My Blue Heaven"
4. "Inspiration for a Song"
5. "After the Storm"
