= Fifi shipwreck =

Tugboat that caught fire and sank in Bahrain

Coordinates: 26.120°N 50.722°E

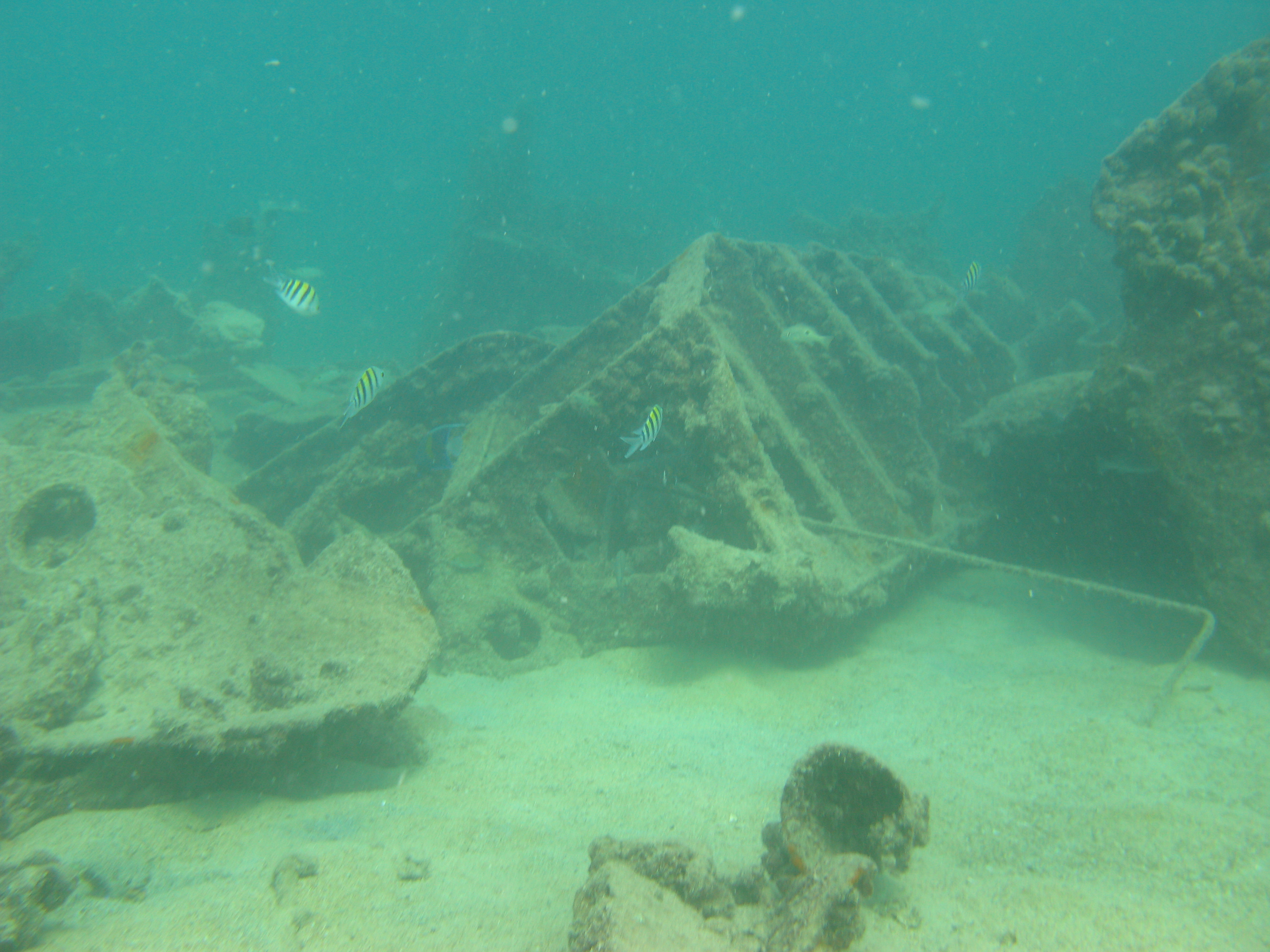
Fifi shipwreck

Fifi was a tugboat that caught fire and sank in the 1980s. It is now a shipwreck located approximately 8 km (5 mi) east of Al-Bander resort in Bahrain and is a popular dive site.

== History ==
The vessel caught fire and sank in the early 1980s. The ship was owned by Shaheen Bin Saqer bin Shaheen, founder of Awalco Marine. It was named after his only daughter, who was better known as Fifi.

The wreck site is one of the most popular diving sites in Bahrain. The site is suitable for sport and diving students because the wreck lies in relatively shallow water. The visibility at the wreck site is good, and the currents do not hinder the diving.
