= Afloat (Maupassant) =

1888 story by Guy De Maupassant

Afloat (French: Sur l'eau) is an 1888 story by Guy De Maupassant. Ostensibly it is a logbook of a nine-day cruise along the côte d’Azur. The French original was given illustrations by Édouard Riou who the previous year had illustrated Alexandre Dumas' Le Comte de Monte-Cristo (1887), and would also illustrate Maupassant's Un soir (1889). These illustrations, as engraved by the Guillaume brothers, were also included in the English translation by Laura Ensor published by Routledge in 1889. A new translation by Douglas Parmée appeared in 2009.
