= Adiós, Navarre =

Coordinates: 42°41′N 1°44′W

Adiós
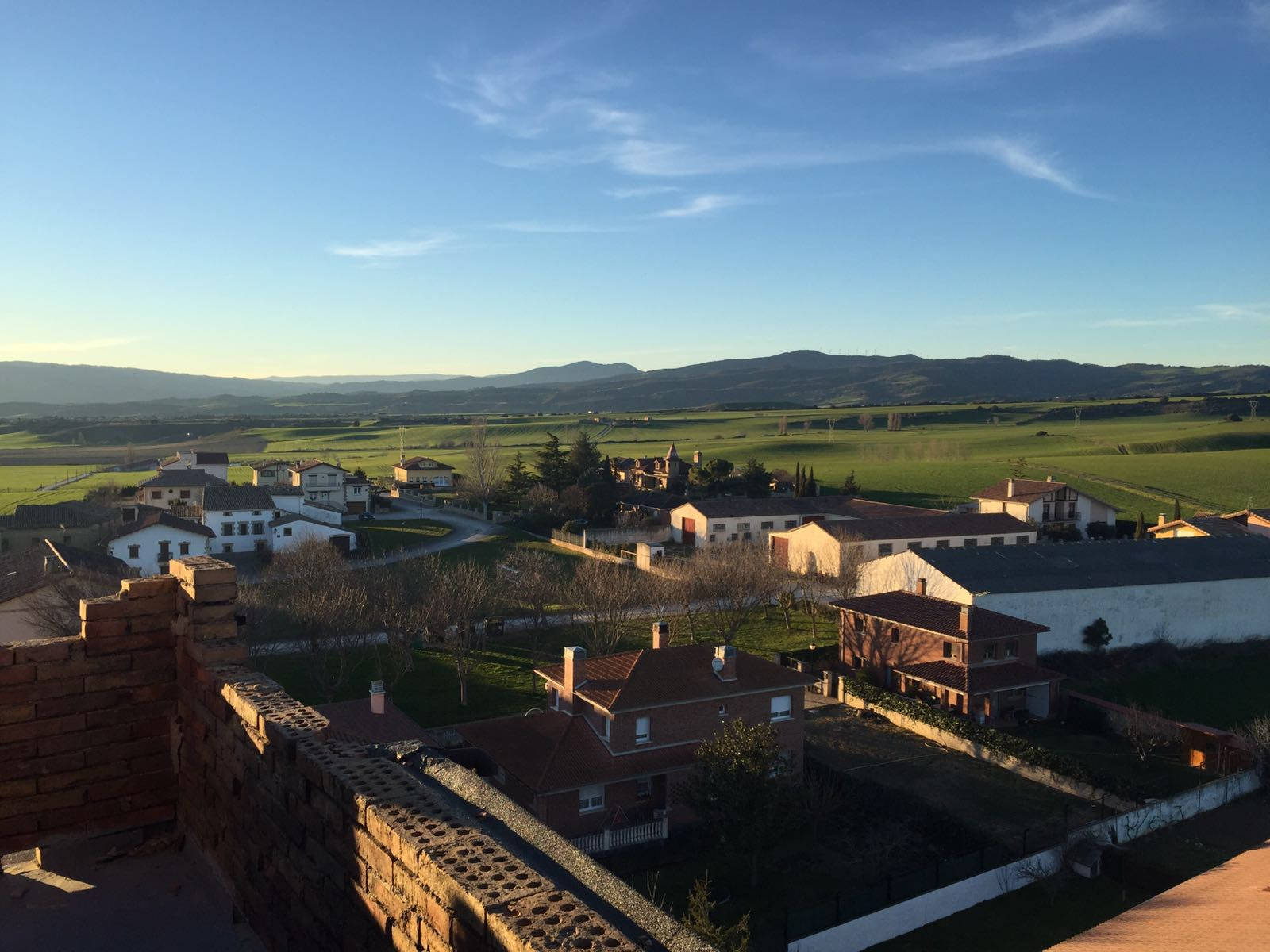
- View of Adiós

- Flag Coat of arms

- Location in Spain.
- Country: Spain
- Autonomous community: Navarra

Area
  - Total: 7.72 km^{2} (2.98 sq mi)
- Elevation: 482 m (1,581 ft)

Population (2025-01-01)
  - Total: 194
  - Density: 25.1/km^{2} (65.1/sq mi)
- Time zone: UTC+1 (CET)
  - Summer (DST): UTC+2 (CEST)
- Website: www.mancomunidad-valdizarbe.es

Adiós is a municipality in the province and autonomous community of Navarre, Spain. As of 2002, the population was 147.
