= Fifi Ejindu =

Nigerian architect

- Born: Offiong Ekanem Ejindu; 25 May 1962 (age 64); Ibadan, Nigeria
- Occupations: Architect; Businesswoman

Offiong Ekanem Ejindu, known as 'Fifi', (born 25 May 1962) is a Nigerian architect, businesswoman and philanthropist.

== Biography ==
Offiong Ekanem Ejindu was born in Ibadan, the capital of Oyo State, in 1962. She is the daughter of Professor Sylvester Joseph Una, an academic and former member of the National Assembly. She is the great-granddaughter of King James Ekpo Bassey, an Efik monarch of the colonial era whose seat was in Cobham Town, Calabar, Nigeria. King Bassey, her mother's grandfather, was crowned king of Cobham Town by representatives of Queen Victoria in 1893. Ejindu uses the title of "H.H. The Obonganwan King James" socially. She is married to Amechi Ejindu, who is also her business partner.

Ejindu attended the Senior Staff School at the University of Ibadan and Queen's College, Lagos before traveling to the United States to attend the UNC Charlotte. She studied Architecture at Pratt Institute in Brooklyn, New York, graduating in 1983 and becoming the first black African woman to be awarded a Bachelor of Architecture (BArch) from Pratt. She then took courses at the Massachusetts Institute of Technology before working at a private firm in New York City. Ejindu then returned to Pratt to get her Master of Urban Planning degree, after which she returned to Nigeria.

In 1995, Ejindu started the Starcrest Group of companies, which includes Starcrest Investment Ltd., Starcrest Associates Ltd. and Starcrest Industries Ltd, all of which are involved in real estate, oil and gas, and building construction. As of 2026, none of Ejindu's companies have an online presence.

In 2013, she was awarded the African Achievers African Arts and Fashion Lifetime Achievement award.

== Works ==
- Residence of Spanish Ambassador to Nigeria, Abuja
