= Mademoiselle Fifi (short story) =

1882 short story by Guy de Maupassant

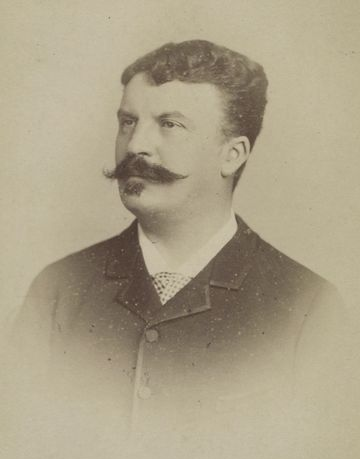
Guy de Maupassant

"Mademoiselle Fifi" is a short story by French writer Guy de Maupassant, published in 1882 in a collection of the same title. Like many of his short stories, such as "Boule de Suif" and "Deux Amis", the story is set during the Franco-Prussian War and explores themes of class barriers, contrasts between the French and German participants, and the pointlessness of the war.

== Plot ==
The story takes place in Normandy in the winter of 1870, in a fictional chateau which is being used as a headquarters by Prussian officers. The main characters of the story are quickly introduced: the Major, a dignified and cultured German aristocrat; his Captain, a boorish and lecherous minor Prussian landowner; two lieutenants from the Prussian bourgeoisie; and the title character, a handsome but arrogant and extremely unpleasant German sub-lieutenant known to his comrades as "Mademoiselle Fifi" due to his effeminate manner.

The officers have been quartered in the chateau for several weeks, and as they are far away from the fighting and do not want to go out due to the endless rain, the officers are desperately bored. They have been spending their days drinking, gambling, and destroying the chateau's paintings, furniture and other fine objects. After a boring lunch, the aristocratic captain suggests a dinner party, and sends an army transport wagon to the local town to bring back some prostitutes to keep the officers company. In the evening, the party begins, and soon the officers and prostitutes are drunk and in high spirits. The officer known as Fifi, who has taken a Jewish prostitute called Rachel, starts smashing things and making violent sexual advances on Rachel. The party-goers start telling dirty jokes in bad French, and the officers make a variety of slurred speeches praising German military prowess, which makes Rachel increasingly angry. When Fifi makes a speech proclaiming that France is crushed and that all of France, including all French women, are now Prussian property, Rachel rebukes him. At this Fifi slaps Rachel, who becomes enraged and stabs Fifi with a cheese knife and jumps out the window. Fifi soon dies, and the major orders a search for Rachel but she is never found. The German officers become curious that the next day, the church bell in the village, which has been silent as a sign of national mourning, is suddenly ringing again. It continues to ring until the day the armistice is signed, when the German officers finally leave the chateau. At the end of the story, it is revealed that Rachel herself has been hiding in the bell tower, ringing the bell as a sign of her personal triumph over the Germans.

== Themes ==
Like many of Maupassant's stories, Mademoisele Fifi explores the theme of contrasting the French and the Germans. The German officers in the novel are all outrageous stereotypes; they all sport beards, have blond or bright red hair, and are depicted as pompous, uncultured men. Fifi himself combines the worst stereotypes of the Germans; he is violent, immoral, arrogant, and takes great delight in pointlessly smashing priceless antiques and objets d'art in the chateau. The German soldiers in the novel are portrayed as blindly obeying any orders and remaining stoically obedient at all times, whilst at the same time being fairly unprofessional soldiers, two of them being killed by accident whilst searching for Rachel after the party.

== Adaptations ==
Maupassant's story has been adapted for the stage. There is Oscar Méténier's play of 1896, as well as Russian composer César Cui's opera based on both the story and the play.

It has also been adapted to film, serving as part of the inspiration for Val Lewton's 1944 film Mademoiselle Fifi.

Ada Galsworthy published an English translation Mademoiselle Fifi and Other Stories in 1919.
