= Paul Ollendorff =

French bookseller and publisher (1851–1920)

- Born: 24 February 1851; Paris, France
- Died: 15 December 1920 (aged 67); Choisy-au-Bac, France
- Occupations: Bookseller, publisher

Paul Ollendorff (24 February 1851– 15 December 1920) was a French publisher and bookseller. He was particularly active in the last years of the 19th century, publishing works by notable French authors such as Guy de Maupassant, Octave Mirbeau, and Jules Renard. His publishing firm was one of the foremost French literary publishing houses of the 1880s and 1890s but one which would decline in the early 20th century due to management errors, outmoded work practices and increasing competition.

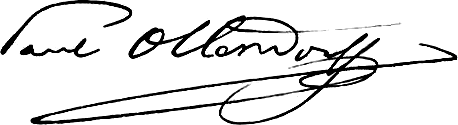
Paul Ollendorff's signature

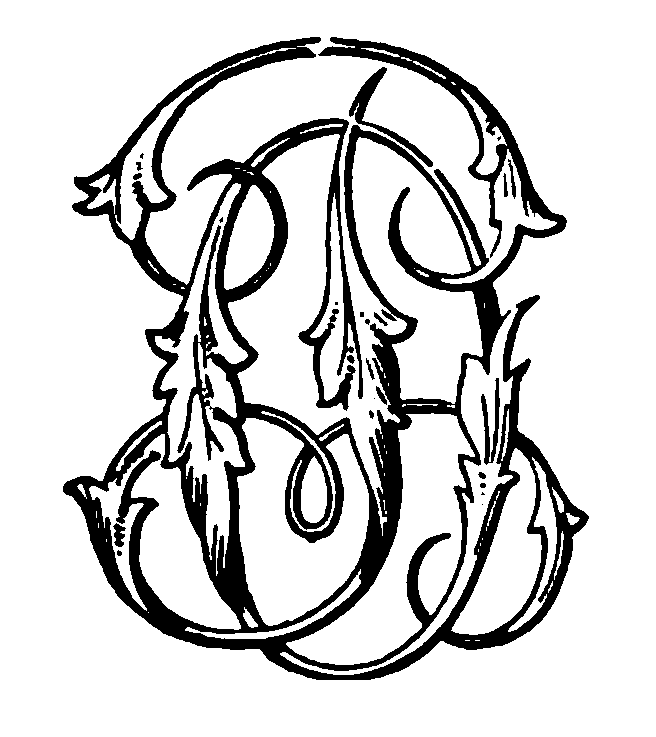
Logo of the firm Paul Ollendorff, Editeur

== Life and career ==
Paul Ollendorff was born in Paris, France, the second son of Heinrich Gottfried Ollendorff, a Polish immigrant to France and the author and publisher of "la méthode Ollendorff" series of language learning books that were first published in the 1840s.

Paul Ollendorff would spend his first years living above his father's editorial offices at 28 bis, rue de Richelieu and it was at that address that in 1875 he would open his own bookselling and publishing firm, La Librairie Ollendorff (English, "Ollendorff bookshop").

Ollendorff made a fortune over the next decade by publishing popular literature: melodramas, sentimental or adventure stories, vaudevilles, and dime novels published as serials in newspapers. His catalogues promoted these works as "distrayants" ("entertaining") et "consolateurs" ("comforting"). His catalogue would later extend to include many authors "de haute tenue" (English, "of high standing") and its 2,000 volumes range from belle lettres to art, music, theatre and travel.

Ollendorff's first major publishing success was Georges Ohnet's Le Maître de forges (1882) which the publisher reprinted 162 times after its first publication. Certain literary critics savagely condemned this book, its author and its publisher (Léon Bloy described Ohnet as "le Jupiter tonnant de l'imbécillité française") but this bestseller was undeniably popular among its middle class readers.

Ohlendorff then published a dozen works by Guy de Maupassant including the short story "Le Horla" (1887), the first novels by Octave Mirbeau, the first five books by Alphonse Allais, and books by such authors as Paul Adam, Jean Lorrain, Paul Féval, fils, Abel Hermant, Willy, Jules Renard and Fernand Vandérem.

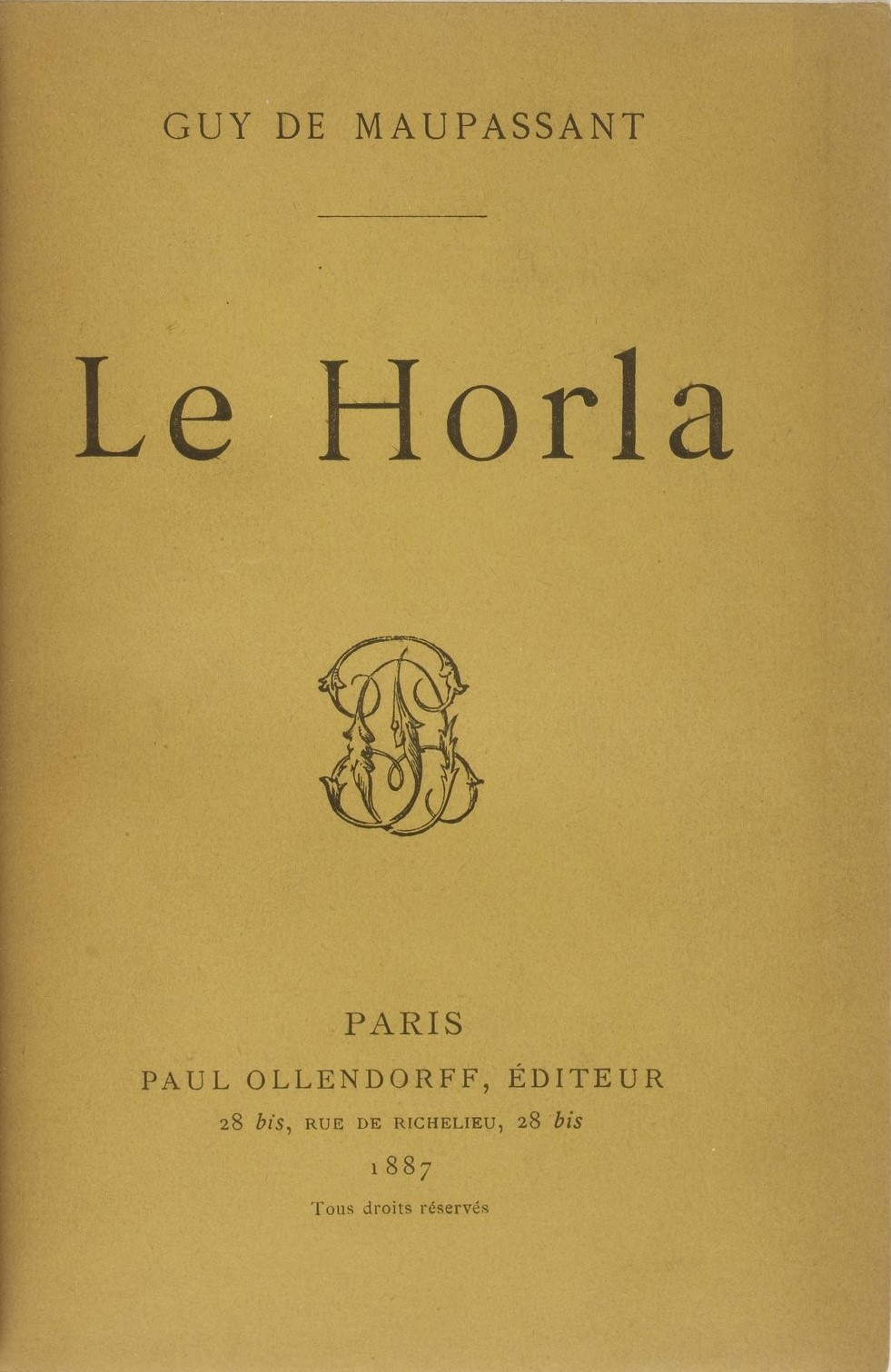
Title page of Maupassant's Le Horla (Ollendorff, 1887)

In 1898, building on his success, Ollendorff took on several partners, changed the name of La Librairie Ollendorff to the Société d'éditions littéraires et artistiques (Literary and Artistic Publishing Company), which now had shareholders, an administrator, and a manager. The business moved to a new address at 50, rue de la Chaussée-d'Antin and would add new authors to its catalogue including Colette, André Theuriet, Romain Rolland and Marcelle Capy. The cover designs of many of the firm's works during these Belle Époque years included Art Nouveau illustrations and decorations.

In 1899 and 1900, he published the illustrated edition of Maupassant's complete works, with wood engravings by Georges Lemoine.

In 1902 Ollendorff launched a new hardcover book series titled the "Romans populaires illustrés" (English, "illustrated popular novels") priced at 3.50 francs per volume. This series was not a success due in part to the competition of attractively designed and priced editions from other publishers, such as La Librairie Nilsson's "feuilletons illustrés" book series. In 1903, he launched Drames vécus! Plus de fictions: la réalité (English, "living dramas! more fiction: reality"), a periodical of illustrated stories.

From 1904 his bookshop began experiencing difficulties. Now a minority shareholder in his publishing company, he was sidelined by his business partners. He therefore sold his shares and went back to working for himself. In the years 1903–1911 together with Antonin Périvier he ran Gil Blas, a newspaper which published serialised novels.

He also continued his activity as a solo book publisher under the name of Paul Ollendorff, éditeur (English, "Paul Ollendorff, publisher". Under that new name he launched several new low-priced book series. In 1904, the firm published its Imprimerie nationale edition of Victor Hugo's complete works. In 1905 Claude Farrère's Les Civilisés published by Ollendorff won the Prix Goncourt.

In early 1913, Alfred Humblot, the firm's publishing director, rejected the manuscript of the first volumes of Marcel Proust's À la recherche du temps perdu which had been recommended for publication by Louis de Robert. In his rejection letter Humblot wrote: "Je suis peut-être bouché à l’émeri, mais je ne puis comprendre qu’un monsieur puisse employer trente pages à décrire comment il se tourne et se retourne dans son lit avant de trouver le sommeil" (English, "I may be as thick as two short planks, but I cannot understand how a gentleman can spend thirty pages describing how he tosses and turns in his bed before falling asleep"). These volumes were also refused publication by Fasquelle and the Nouvelle Revue Française before finally being published by Grasset.

== Personal life ==
Paul Ollendorff was the maternal grandfather of Gilbert Grandval, a member of the French Resistance during the Second World War and later a minister in the government of General Charles de Gaulle.

In 1910 Ollendorff was living at 55, rue d’Amsterdam, Paris 9e. He died on 15 December 1920 in Choisy-au-Bac, France.

== Awards ==
- 1889: Chevalier de la Légion d'honneur

== Book series ==
Ollendorff's publishing firms issued many series including:

- Collection des conteurs joyeux
- La collection Ollendorff
- La collection Ollendorff illustrée
- Collection pour les jeunes filles
- Les grands romans AKA Collection des grands romans
- Les grands romans à 1 F.
- Les grands romans étrangers
- Veladas del hogar
- Nouvelle collection artistique
- Œuvres complètes illustrées de Guy de Maupassant
- Le Roman d'aujourd'hui
- Le Roman d'aventures
- Le Roman de mer et d'outre mer
- Le Roman de sport
- Romans populaires illustrés
