= Gil Blas (periodical) =

Parisian literary periodical

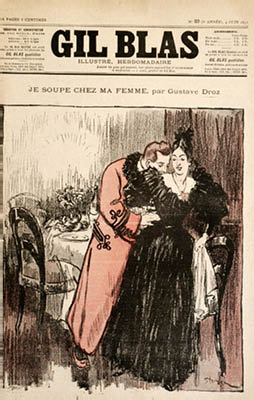
- "Je soupe chez ma femme" ('I Sup with My Wife'). Cover illustration by Théophile Steinlen for a story from "Monsieur, madame et bébé" by Gustave Droz.
- Type: daily literary newspaper
- Publisher: Augustin-Alexandre Dumont
- Founded: November 19, 1879
- Ceased publication: 1938
- Headquarters: Paris, France
- Circulation: 30,000

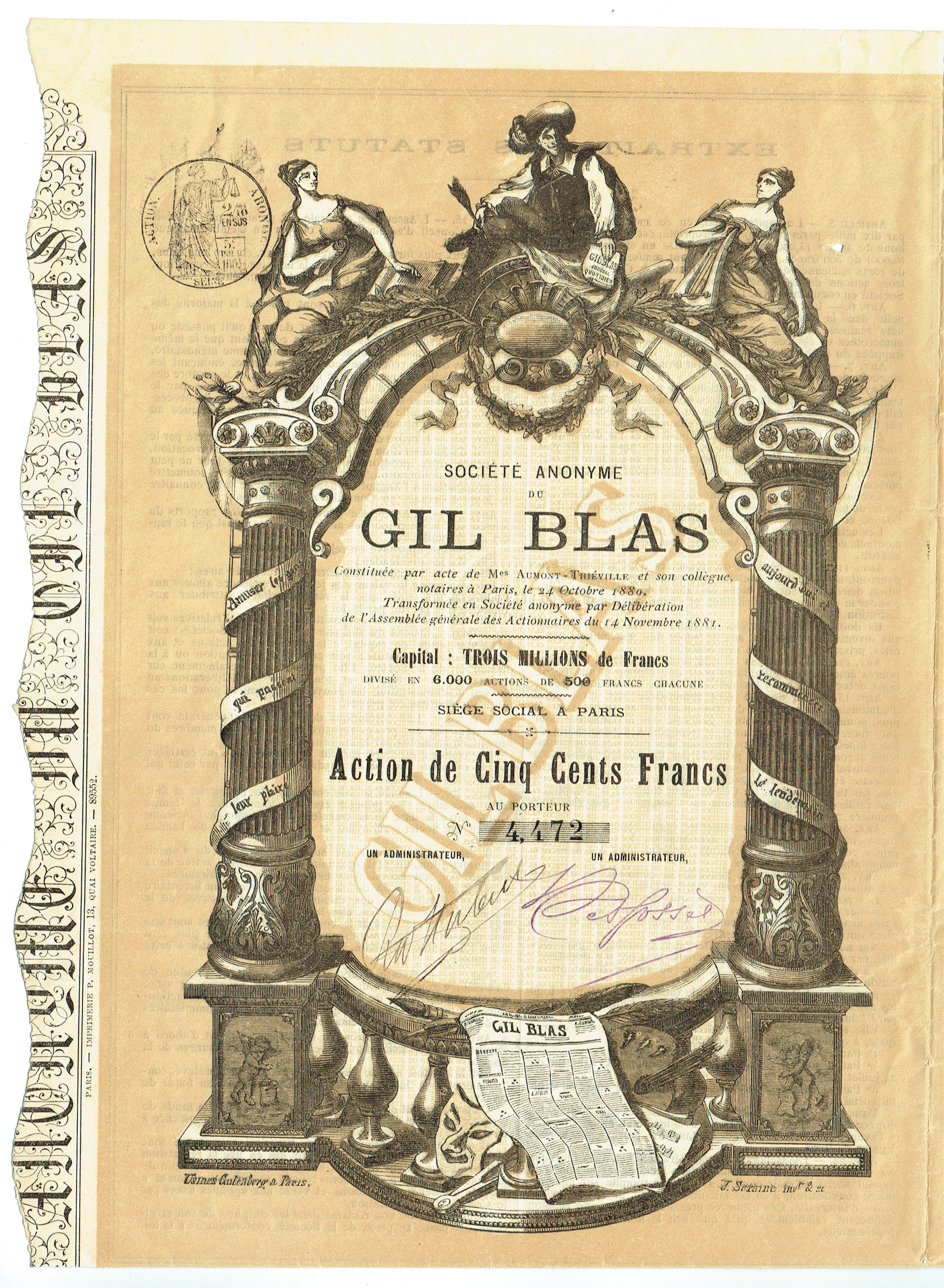
Share of the S. A. du Gil Blas, issued 14 November 1881

Gil Blas (or Le Gil Blas) was a Parisian literary periodical named for Alain-René Lesage's novel Gil Blas. It was founded by the sculptor Augustin-Alexandre Dumont in November 1879.

Gil Blas serialized novels, such as Émile Zola's Germinal (1884) and L'Œuvre (1885), before they appeared in book form. Numerous Guy de Maupassant short stories debuted in Gil Blas. The journal was also known for its opinionated arts and theatre criticism. Contributors included René Blum, Alexandru Bogdan-Pitești, and Abel Hermant. Théophile Steinlen and Albert Guillaume provided illustrations.

In the years 1903 to 1911 Gil Blas was owned and operated by Paul Ollendorff and Antonin Périvier. The newspaper was published regularly until 1914, when there was a short hiatus due to the outbreak of World War I. Afterwards, it was published intermittently until 1938.

In addition to Germinal, Gil Blas serialized the Zola novels L'Argent, Au Bonheur des Dames, and La Joie de vivre.

Gil Blas critic Louis Vauxcelles's phrase "Donatello chez les fauves" ('Donatello among the wild beasts') brought notoriety and attention to the works of Henri Matisse and Les Fauves exhibited at the Salon d'Automne of 1905. Vauxcelles' comment was printed on 17 October 1905 and passed into popular usage.

== Contributors ==
Some well-known authors who were published in Gil Blas include:

- Paul Arène
- Jules Barbey d'Aurevilly
- Émile Bergerat
- Léon Bloy
- Paul Bourget
- Robert Caze
- Léon Cladel
- Claude Debussy
- Charles Desteuque
- Clovis Hugues
- Maurice Lefebvre-Lourdet
- Camille Lemonnier
- René Maizeroy
- Hector Malot
- Guy de Maupassant
- Catulle Mendès
- Georges Ohnet
- Richard O'Monroy
- Jean Richepin
- Henri Rochefort
- Paul Armand Silvestre
- Jules Vallès
- Pierre Veber
- Auguste Villiers de l'Isle-Adam
- Émile Zola

== Controversies ==
In 1887, after seeing a dress-rehearsal of Victorien Sardou's La Tosca at the Théâtre de la Porte Saint-Martin in Paris (with Sarah Bernhardt in the title role), Gil Blas published a complete description of the plot on the morning of opening night. Following the premiere, Sardou brought a successful suit for damages against Gil Blas.

In 1888 Camille Lemonnier was prosecuted in Paris for "offending against public morals" by a story in Gil Blas, and was condemned to a fine.
