= Guy de Maupassant =

French writer (1850–1893)

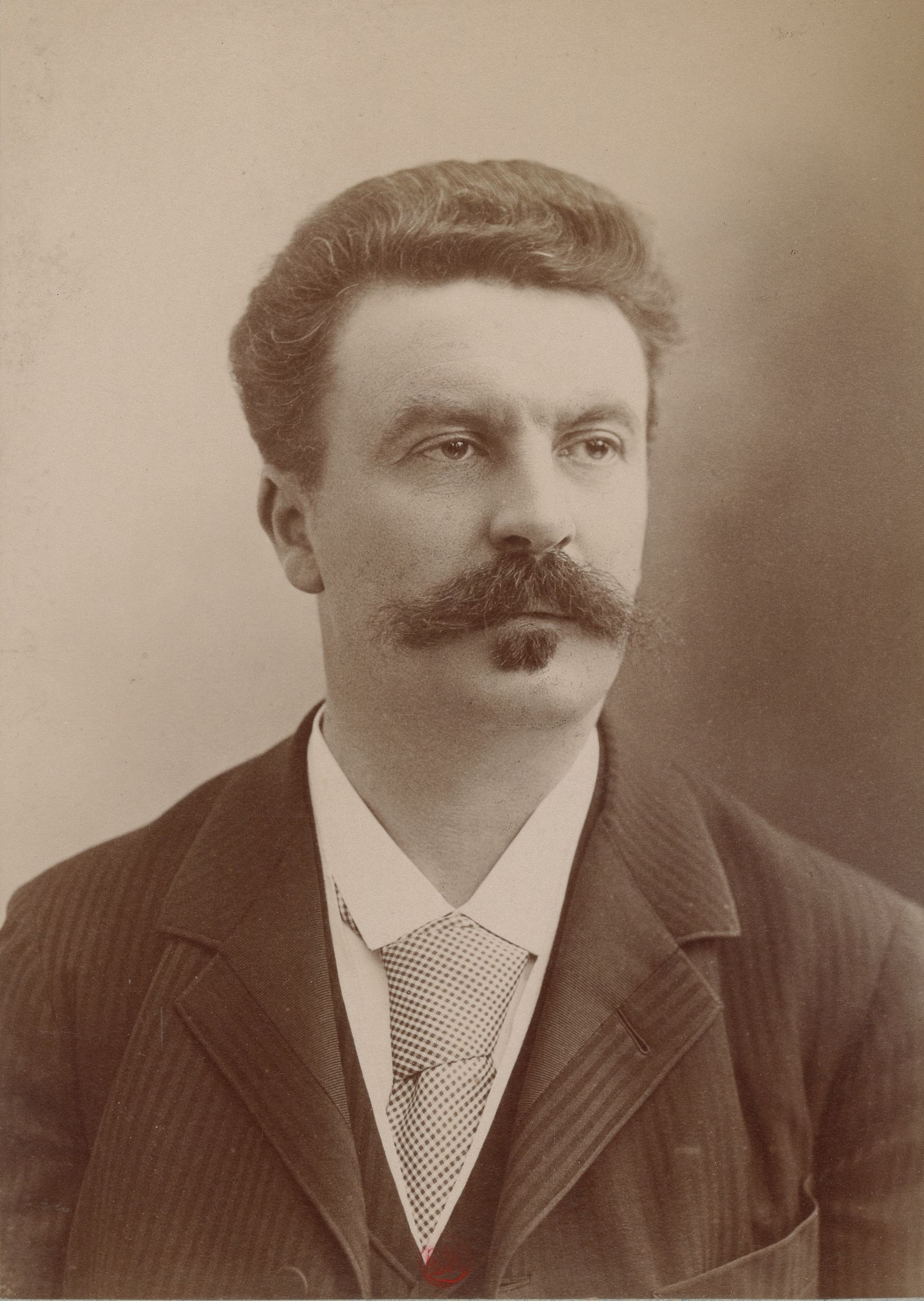
- Maupassant photographed by Nadar, c. 1888
- Born: Henri René Albert Guy de Maupassant; 5 August 1850; Tourville-sur-Arques, Normandy, France
- Died: 6 July 1893 (aged 42); Passy, Paris, France
- Resting place: Montparnasse Cemetery, Paris
- Occupations: Novelist, short story writer, poet, comedian
- Writing career
- Pen name: Guy de Valmont, Joseph Prunier
- Genres: Naturalism, Realism

Signature
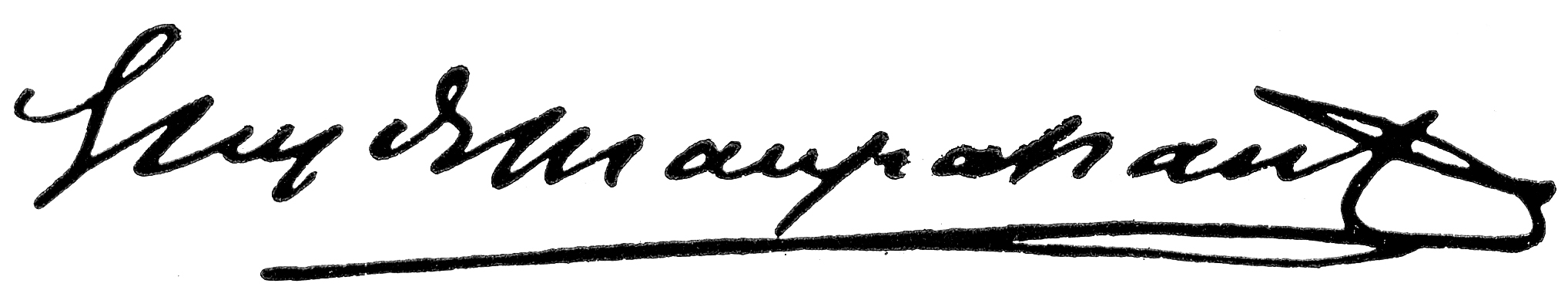

Henri René Albert Guy de Maupassant (UK: /ˈmoʊpæsɒ̃/, US: /ˈmoʊpəsɒnt, ˌmoʊpəˈsɒ̃/; French: [ɡi d(ə) mopasɑ̃]; 5 August 1850 – 6 July 1893) was a 19th-century French author, celebrated as a master of the short story and associated with the naturalist literary school of thought, depicting human lives, destinies, and social forces in disillusioned and often pessimistic terms.

Maupassant was a protégé of Gustave Flaubert and his stories are characterized by economy of style and efficient, seemingly effortless dénouements. Many are set during the Franco-Prussian War of the 1870s, describing the futility of war and the innocent civilians who, caught up in events beyond their control, are permanently changed by their experiences. He wrote 300 short stories, six novels, three travel books, and one volume of verse. His first published story, "Boule de Suif" ("The Dumpling", 1880), is often considered his most famous work.

== Biography ==
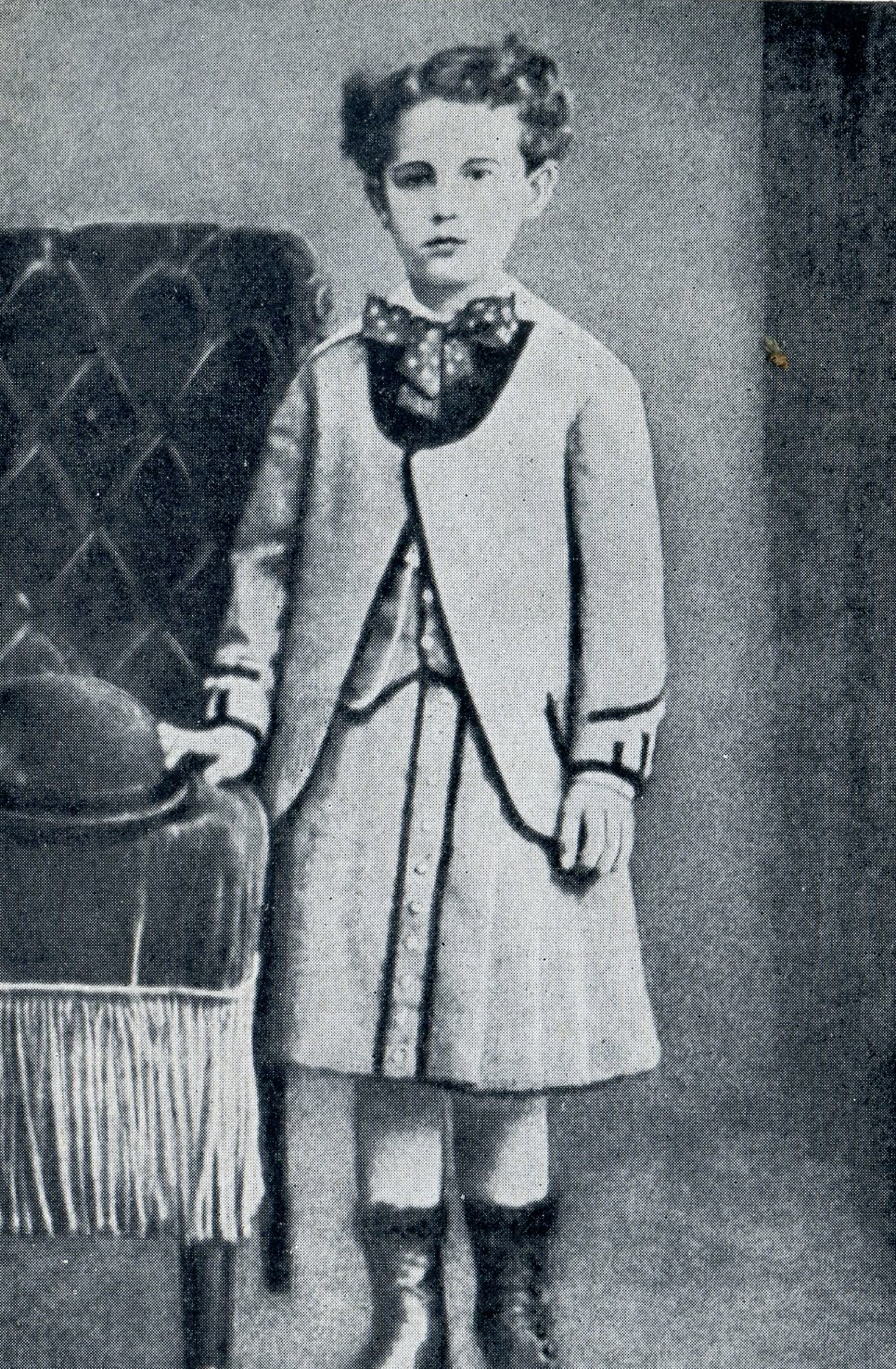
Guy de Maupassant aged 7 (Unbreeched)

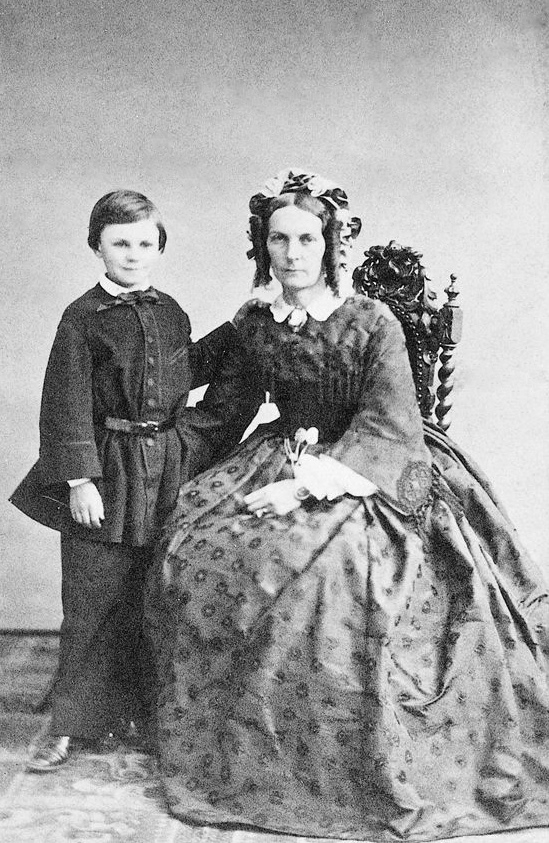
Guy de Maupassant (Breeched) and his mother, Laure

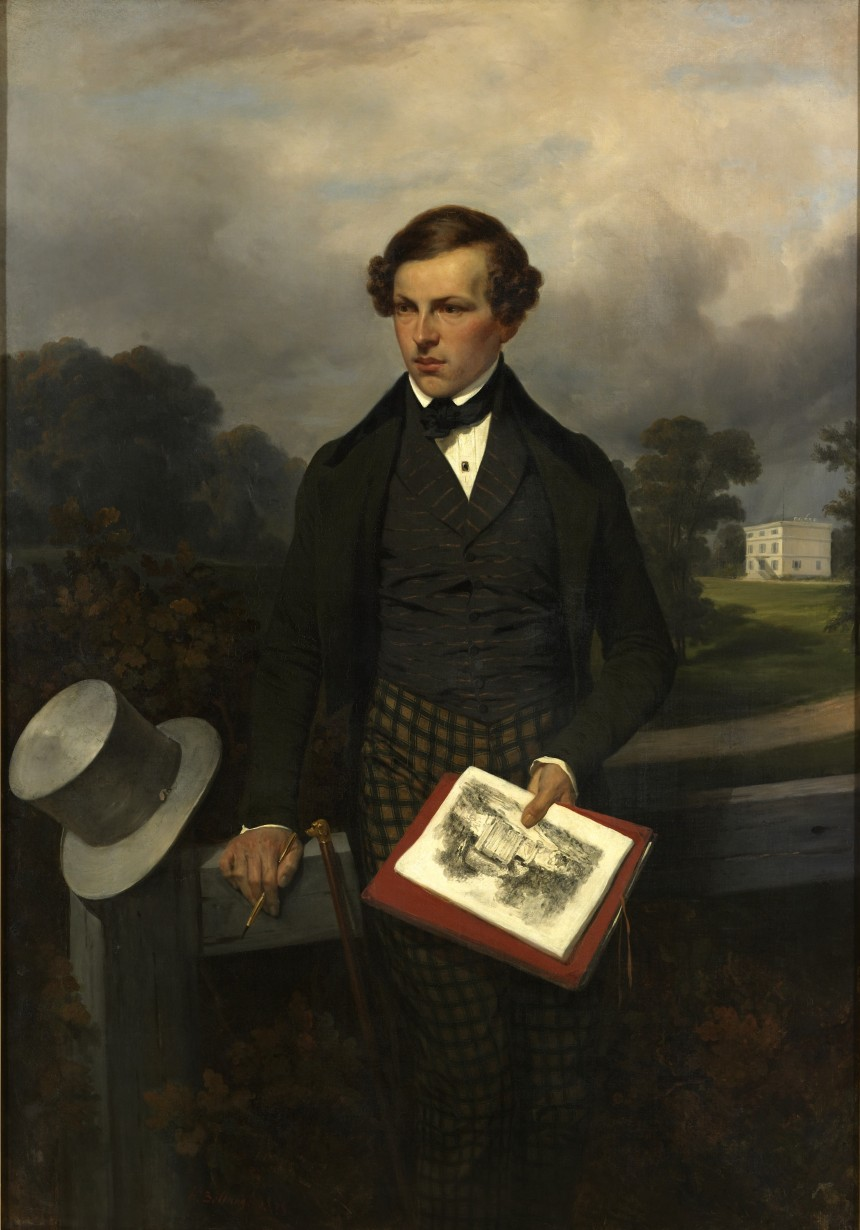
His father, Gustave de Maupassant, by Hippolyte Bellangé

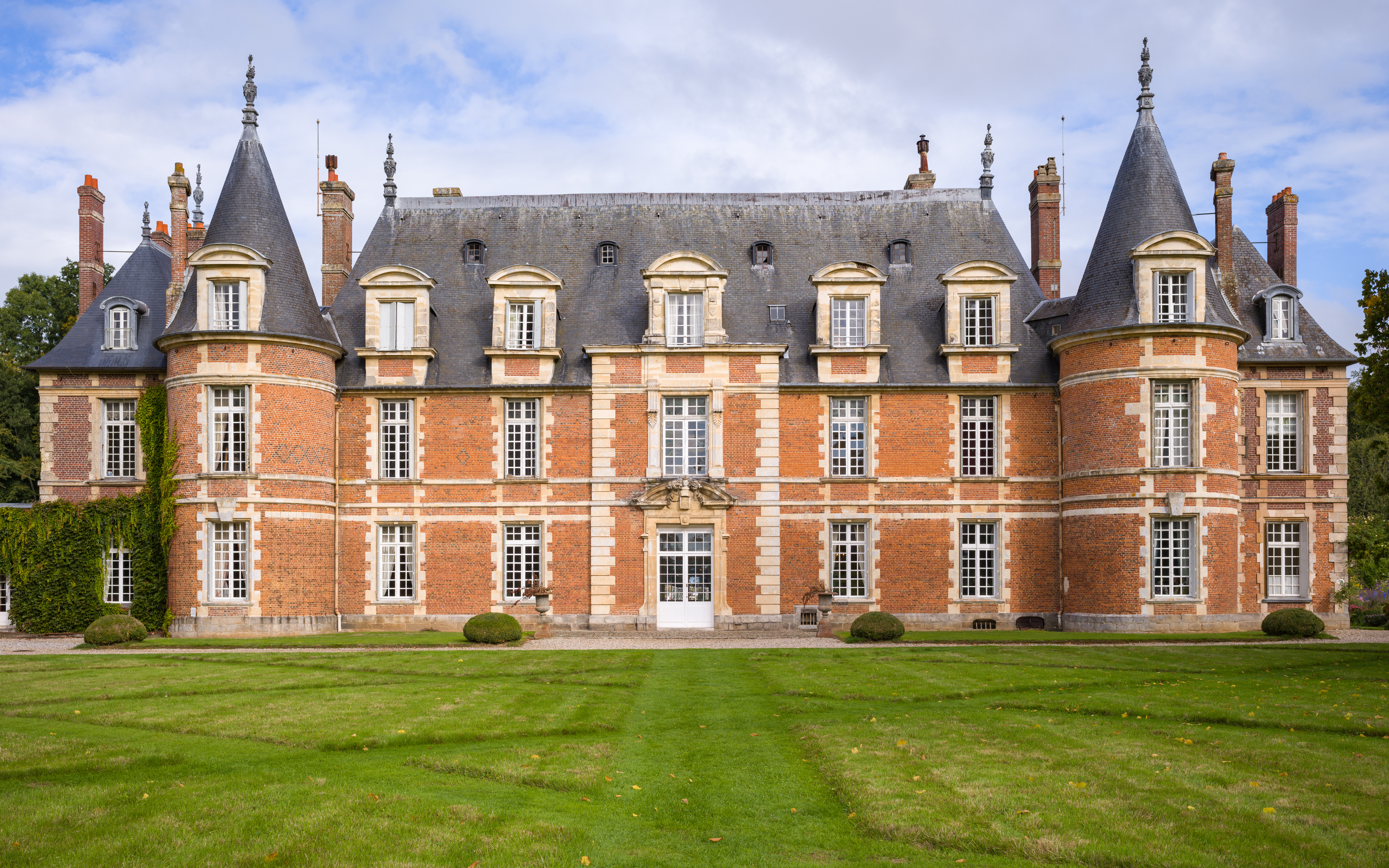
Château de Miromesnil, Normandy

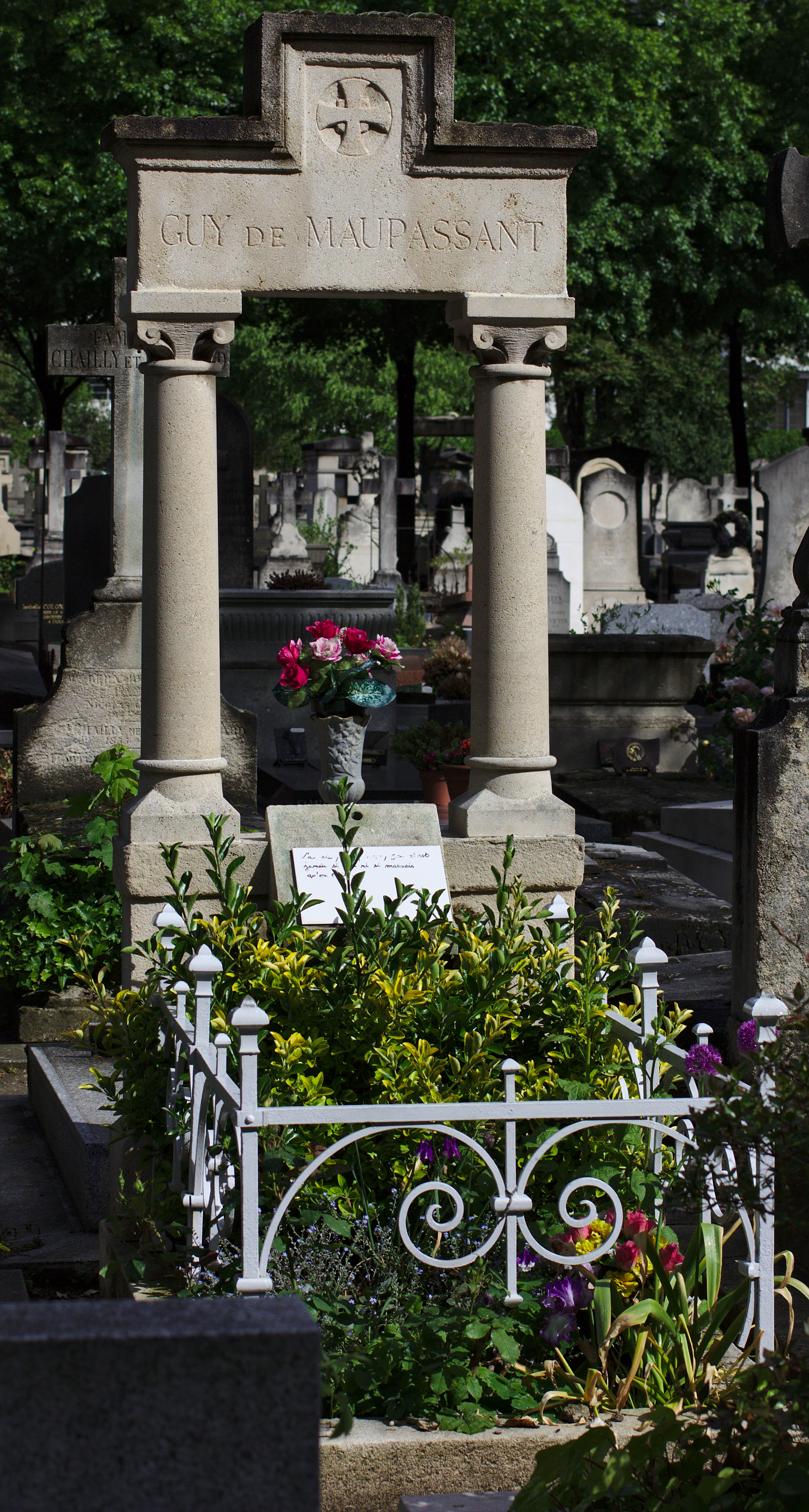
Grave at Montparnasse, Paris

Henri-René-Albert-Guy de Maupassant was born on 5 August 1850 at the late 16th-century Château de Miromesnil (near Dieppe in the Seine-Inférieure [now Seine-Maritime] Department, France), the elder son of Gustave de Maupassant (1821–99) and Laure Le Poittevin, whose family hailed from the prosperous bourgeoisie. His mother urged her husband when they married in 1846 to obtain the right to use the particule or form "de Maupassant" instead of "Maupassant" as his family name, in order to indicate noble birth. Gustave's great-great-grandfather, Jean-Baptiste de Maupassant (1699–1774), conseiller-secrétaire to King Louis XV, had been ennobled by Emperor Francis I in 1752, and although his family were considered petite noblesse they had not yet received official recognition by the Kingdom of France. He then obtained from the Tribunal Civil of Rouen by royal decree dated 9 July 1846 the right to style himself "de Maupassant" instead of "Maupassant", being formally assumed as the family name before the births of his children.

When Maupassant was 11 and his brother Hervé was five, his mother, an independent-minded woman, risked social disgrace to obtain a legal separation from her husband, who was violent towards her.

After the separation, Laure Le Poittevin kept custody of her two sons. In the absence of Maupassant's father, his mother became the most influential figure in the young boy's life. She was an exceptionally well-read woman and was very fond of classical literature, particularly Shakespeare. Until the age of thirteen, Guy lived happily with his mother, at Étretat in Normandy. At the Villa des Verguies, between the sea and the luxuriant countryside, he grew very fond of fishing and of outdoor activities. When Guy reached the age of thirteen, his mother placed her two sons as day boarders in a private school, the Institution Leroy-Petit, in Rouen—the Institution Robineau of Maupassant's story La Question du Latin—for classical studies. From his early education, he retained a marked hostility to religion, and to judge from verses composed around this time, he deplored the ecclesiastical atmosphere, its ritual and discipline. Finding the place unbearable, he finally got himself expelled in his penultimate year.

In 1867, while he was in junior high school, Maupassant met Gustave Flaubert at Croisset on the insistence of his mother. Next year, in autumn, he was sent to the Lycée Pierre-Corneille in Rouen where he proved a good scholar, indulging in poetry and taking a prominent part in theatricals. In October 1868, at the age of 18, he saved the famous poet Algernon Swinburne from drowning off the coast of Étretat.

The Franco-Prussian War broke out soon after his graduation from college in 1870 and Maupassant volunteered to serve in the French Army without attending military academy as aspirant. In 1871, he left Normandy and moved to Paris, where he spent ten years as a clerk in the Navy Department. During this time his only recreation and relaxation was boating on the Seine on Sundays and holidays.

Gustave Flaubert took him under his protection and acted as a kind of literary guardian to him, guiding his debut in journalism and literature. At Flaubert's home he met Émile Zola (1840–1902) and the Russian novelist Ivan Turgenev (1818–1883), as well as many of the proponents of the realist and naturalist schools. He wrote and himself played (1875) in a comedy—À la feuille de rose, maison turque—with Flaubert's blessing.

In 1878, he was transferred to the Ministry of Public Instruction and became a contributing editor to several leading newspapers such as Le Figaro, Gil Blas, Le Gaulois and l'Écho de Paris. He devoted his spare time to writing novels and short stories.

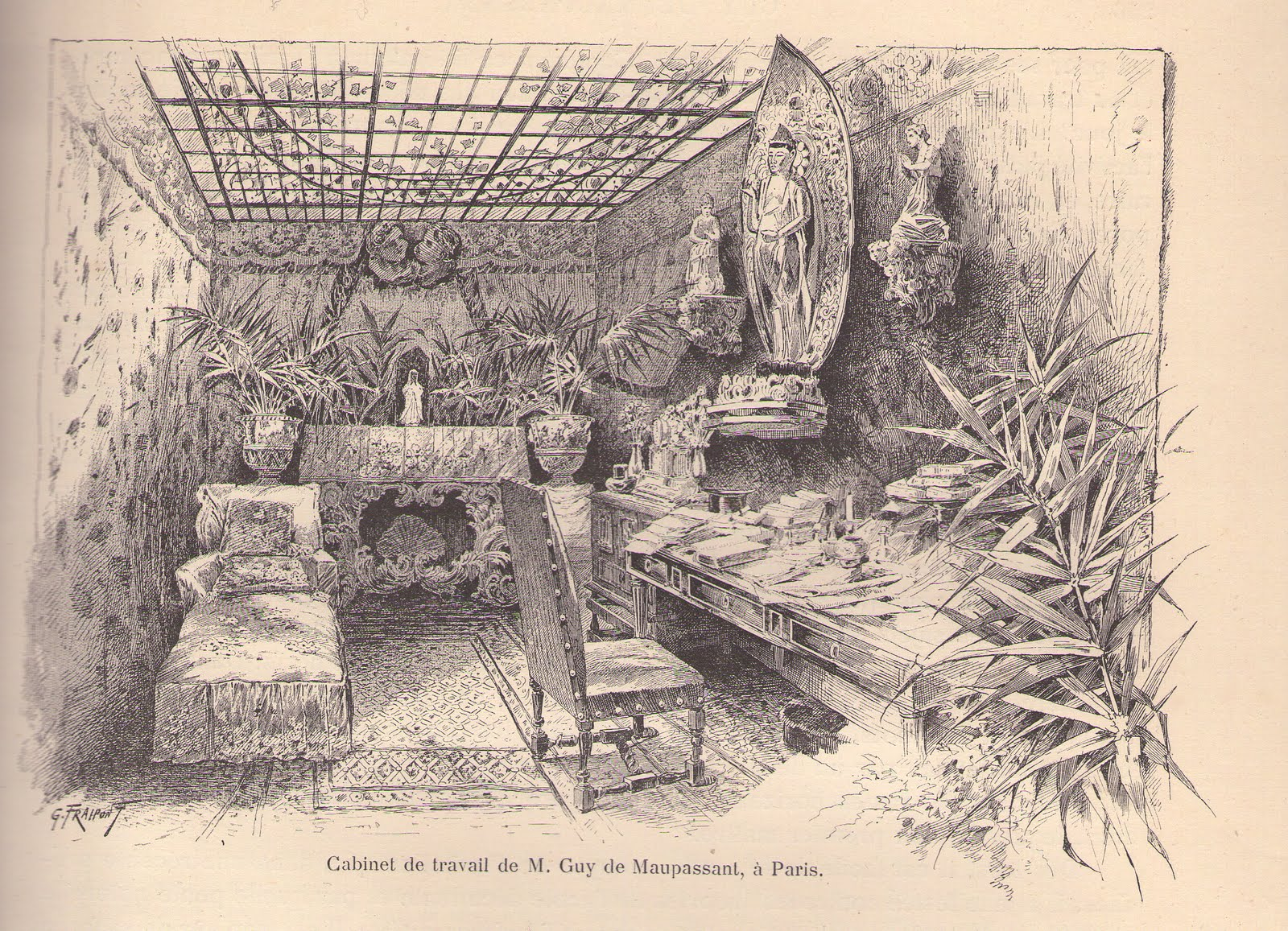
Maupassant's study, illustrated by Gustave Fraipont

In 1880 he published what is considered his first masterpiece, "Boule de Suif", which was met with instant and tremendous success. Flaubert characterized it as "a masterpiece that will endure". This, Maupassant's first piece of short fiction set during the Franco-Prussian War of 1870–1871, was followed by short stories such as "Deux Amis", "Mother Savage", and "Mademoiselle Fifi".

"The fear that haunted his restless brain day and night was already visible in his eyes, I for one considered him then as a doomed man. I knew that the subtle poison of his own Boule de Suif had already begun its work of destruction in this magnificent brain. Did he know it himself? I often thought he did. The MS. of his Sur L'Eau was lying on the table between us, he had just read me a few chapters, the best thing he had ever written I thought. He was still producing with feverish haste one masterpiece after another, slashing his excited brain with champagne, ether and drugs of all sorts. Women after women in endless succession hastened the destruction, women recruited from all quarters ... actresses, ballet-dancers, midinettes, grisettes, common prostitutes—'le taureau triste' his friends used to call him."

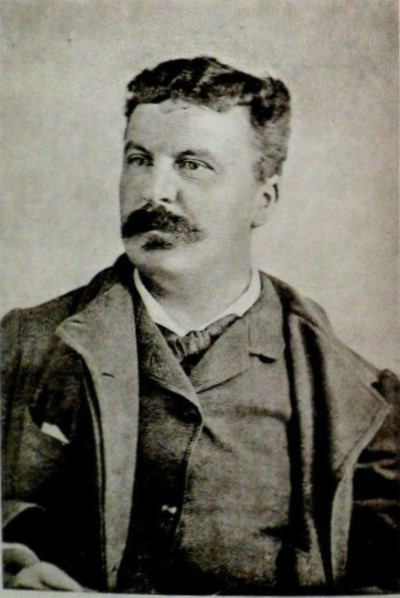
Maupassant in the 1880s

The decade from 1880 to 1891 was the most fertile period of Maupassant's life. Made famous by his first short story, he worked methodically and produced two or sometimes four volumes annually. His talent and practical business sense made him wealthy.

In 1881 he published his first volume of short stories under the title of La Maison Tellier; it reached its twelfth edition within two years. In 1883 he finished his first novel, Une Vie (translated into English as A Woman's Life), 25,000 copies of which were sold in less than a year.

Bed 29, published in 1884, is a social and political satirical collection of some of his best short stories, including the titular story which is shocking and scandalous, even by modern standards.

His editor, Victor Havard, commissioned him to write more stories, and Maupassant continued to produce them efficiently and frequently. His second novel, Bel-Ami, which came out in 1885, had thirty-seven printings in four months. Then, he wrote what many consider his greatest novel, Pierre et Jean (1888).

With a natural aversion to society, he loved retirement, solitude, and meditation. He traveled extensively in Algeria, Italy, England, Brittany, Sicily, and the Auvergne, and from each voyage brought back a new volume. He cruised on his private yacht Bel-Ami, named after his novel. This life did not prevent him from making friends among the literary celebrities of his day: Alexandre Dumas, fils had a paternal affection for him; at Aix-les-Bains he met Hippolyte Taine (1828–1893) and became devoted to the philosopher-historian.

Flaubert continued to act as his literary godfather. His friendship with the Goncourts was of short duration; his frank and practical nature reacted against the ambiance of gossip, scandal, duplicity, and invidious criticism that the two brothers had created around them in the guise of an 18th-century style salon.

Maupassant was one of a fair number of 19th-century Parisians (including Charles Gounod, Alexandre Dumas, fils, and Charles Garnier) who did not care for the Eiffel Tower (erected 1887/89). He often ate lunch in the restaurant at its base, not out of preference for the food but because only there could he avoid seeing its otherwise unavoidable profile. He and forty-six other Parisian literary and artistic notables attached their names to an elaborately irate letter of protest against the tower's construction, written to the Minister of Public Works, and published on 14 February 1887.

Declining appointment to the Legion of Honour and election to the Académie Française, Maupassant also wrote under several pseudonyms, including "Joseph Prunier", "Guy de Valmont", and "Maufrigneuse" (which he used from 1881 to 1885).

In his later years he developed a constant desire for solitude, an obsession for self-preservation, and a fear of death and paranoia of persecution caused by the syphilis he had contracted in his youth. It has been suggested that his brother, Hervé, also suffered from syphilis and that the disease may have been congenital. On 2 January 1892, Maupassant tried to take his own life by cutting his throat; he was committed to the private asylum of Esprit Blanche at Passy, in Paris, where he died on 6 July 1893 from syphilis.

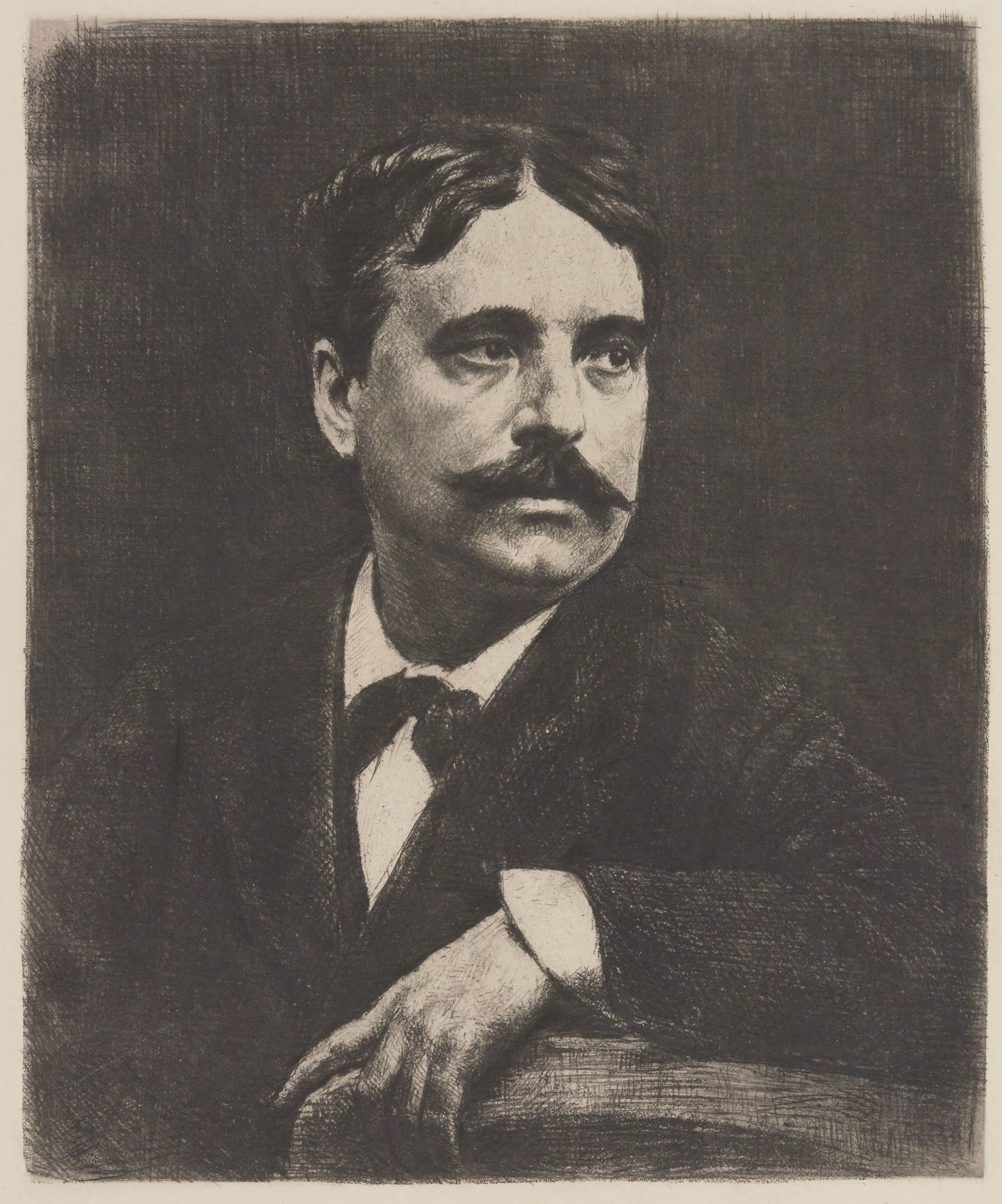
Engraving of Maupassant by Marcellin Desboutin

Maupassant penned his own epitaph: "I have coveted everything and taken pleasure in nothing." He is buried in Section 26 of the Montparnasse Cemetery, Paris.

== Significance ==
Maupassant is considered a father of the modern short story. Literary theorist Kornelije Kvas wrote that along "with Chekhov, Maupassant is the greatest master of the short story in world literature. He is not a naturalist like Zola; to him, physiological processes do not constitute the basis of human actions, although the influence of the environment is manifested in his prose. In many respects, Maupassant's naturalism is Schopenhauerian anthropological pessimism, as he is often harsh and merciless when it comes to depicting human nature. He owes most to Flaubert, from whom he learned to use a concise and measured style and to establish a distance towards the object of narration." He delighted in clever plotting, and served as a model for Somerset Maugham and O. Henry in this respect. One of his famous short stories, "The Necklace", was imitated with a twist by Maugham ("Mr Know-All", "A String of Beads"). Henry James's "Paste" adapts another story of his with a similar title, "The Jewels".

Taking his cue from Balzac, Maupassant wrote comfortably in both the high-realist and fantastic modes; stories and novels such as "L'Héritage" and Bel-Ami aim to recreate Third Republic France in a realistic way, whereas many of the short stories (notably "Le Horla" and "Qui sait?") describe apparently supernatural phenomena.

The supernatural in Maupassant, however, is often implicitly a symptom of the protagonists' troubled minds; Maupassant was fascinated by the burgeoning discipline of psychiatry, and attended the public lectures of Jean-Martin Charcot between 1885 and 1886.

== Legacy ==
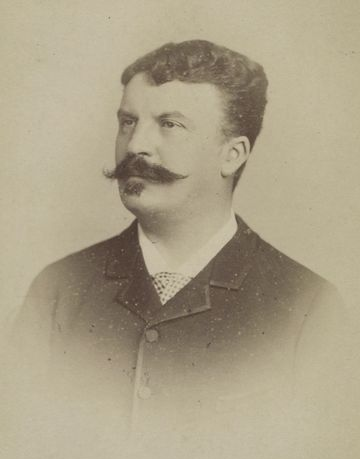
Guy de Maupassant early in his career; by Alphonse Liébert.

Leo Tolstoy used Maupassant as the subject for one of his essays on art: The Works of Guy de Maupassant. His stories are second only to Shakespeare in their inspiration of movie adaptations with films ranging from Stagecoach, Oyuki the Virgin and Masculine Feminine.

Friedrich Nietzsche's autobiography mentions him in the following text:

"I cannot at all conceive in which century of history one could haul together such inquisitive and at the same time delicate psychologists as one can in contemporary Paris: I can name as a sample – for their number is by no means small, ... or to pick out one of the stronger race, a genuine Latin to whom I am particularly attached, Guy de Maupassant."

William Saroyan wrote a short story about Maupassant in his 1971 book, Letters from 74 rue Taitbout or Don't Go But If You Must Say Hello To Everybody.

Isaac Babel wrote a short story about him, "Guy de Maupassant." It appears in The Collected Stories of Isaac Babel and in the story anthology You’ve Got To Read This: Contemporary American Writers Introduce Stories that Held Them in Awe.

Gene Roddenberry, in an early draft for The Questor Tapes, wrote a scene in which the android Questor employs Maupassant's theory that, "the human female will open her mind to a man to whom she has opened other channels of communications." In the script Questor copulates with a woman to obtain information that she is reluctant to impart. Due to complaints from NBC executives, this scene was never filmed.

Michel Drach directed and co-wrote a 1982 French biographical film: Guy de Maupassant. Claude Brasseur stars as the titular character.

Several of Maupassant's short stories, including "La Peur" and "The Necklace", were adapted as episodes of the 1986 Indian anthology television series Katha Sagar. The French anthology television series Chez Maupassant ran for three seasons in 2007, 2008 and 2011, adapting 24 of Maupassant's stories to critical acclaim and high viewership.
