= List of Franco-Prussian War films =

Below is an incomplete list of feature films, television films or television series which include events of the Franco-Prussian War. This list does not include documentaries, short films.

== Films ==
Year	Country	Main title (Alternative title)	Original title (Original script)	Director	Subject
1911	German Empire	The Traitress	Die Verräterin	Urban Gad	Drama.
1914	United States	The Ordeal		Will S. Davis	War.
1915	France	A page of glory	Une page de gloire	Léonce Perret	Drama, War.
1923	Poland	Bartek the winner	Bartek zwycięzca	Edward Puchalski	Drama, History, War. Based on a novel Bartek zwycięzca.
1934	Soviet Union	Boule de Suif	Пышка	Mikhail Romm	Drama. Based on a novel Boule de Suif.
1936	United States	The Story of Louis Pasteur		William Dieterle	Biography, Drama, History. Louis Pasteur
1936	United Kingdom	Spy of Napoleon		Maurice Elvey	Drama, History. Based on a novel A Spy of Napoleon.
1939	United Kingdom	Young Man's Fancy		Robert Stevenson	Comedy.
1940	Nazi Germany	Bismarck		Wolfgang Liebeneiner	Biography, Drama. Otto von Bismarck
1942	Nazi Germany	Wedding in Barenhof	Hochzeit auf Bärenhof	Carl Froelich	Based on a novel Jolanthes Hochzeit.
1943	France	The Heart of a Nation	Untel père et fils	Julien Duvivier	Drama, War.
1944	United States	Mademoiselle Fifi		Robert Wise	Drama, War. Based on two short stories Mademoiselle Fifi, Boule de Suif.
1945	France	Angel and Sinner	Boule de Suif	Christian-Jaque	Drama. Based on two short stories Mademoiselle Fifi, Boule de Suif.
1950	West Germany	A Day Will Come	Es kommt ein Tag	Rudolf Jugert	Drama. Based on a novel Korporal Mombour.
1952	Italy	The Flame	La Fiammata	Alessandro Blasetti	Drama.
1959	West Germany; France	The Goose of Sedan	Die Gans von Sedan	Helmut Käutner	Comedy, War. Based on a novel Un Dimanche au Champ D'Honneur.
1959	France; Italy	The Green Mare	La jument verte	Claude Autant-Lara	Comedy, Drama, History. Based on a novel The Green Mare.
1970	France; United States	Another Man, Another Chance	Un autre homme, une autre chance	Claude Lelouch	Adventure, Drama, Romance, Western.
1986	France	The Intruder	L'Intruse	Bruno Gantillon	Drama.
1987	France	Field of Honor	Champ d'honneur	Jean-Pierre Denis	Drama, History, War.

== Paris Commune ==
=== Films ===
Year	Country	Main title (Alternative title)	Original title (Original script)	Director	Subject
1929	Soviet Union	Communard pipe	Трубка коммунара	Kote Marjanishvili	Action, Drama. Based on a novel Communard pipe.
1929	Soviet Union	The New Babylon	Новый Вавилон	Grigori Kozintsev; Leonid Trauberg	Drama, History.
1936	Soviet Union	Dawn of Paris	Зори Парижа	Grigori Roshal	Drama. Jarosław Dąbrowski
1976	Poland; Soviet Union	Jarosław Dąbrowski		Bohdan Poręba	Biography, History. Jarosław Dąbrowski
1978	France	Civil Wars in France	Guerres civiles en France	François Barat; Joël Farges; Vincent Nordon	Drama.
1978	France	The Point-du-Jour Barricade	La Barricade du Point-du-Jour	René Richon	Drama, History.
1990	United Kingdom; France	1871		Ken McMullen	Drama, History, Romance.
2000	France	La Commune (Paris, 1871)		Peter Watkins	Drama, History, War.

=== Television films ===
Year	Country	Main title (Alternative title)	Original title (Original script)	Director	Subject
1966	France	The Destiny of Rossel	Le Destin de Rossel	Jean Prat	Louis Rossel
1977	France	Rossel and the Paris Commune	Rossel et la Commune de Paris	Serge Moati	Louis Rossel
1994	France	A day in Luxembourg	Une journée au Luxembourg	Jean Baronnet	History.

== Television films ==
Year	Country	Main title (Alternative title)	Original title (Original script)	Director	Subject
1973	France	The mask with golden eyes	Le masque aux yeux d'or	Paul Paviot	François Achille Bazaine
1983	France; West Germany	The lime trees of Lautenbach	Les tilleuls de Lautenbach	Bernard Saint-Jacques	
1986	West Germany	Mademoiselle Fifi		Karl Fruchtmann	Based on a novel Mademoiselle Fifi.
1992	France	Mademoiselle Fifi or Laughing Story	Mademoiselle Fifi ou Histoire de rire	Claude Santelli	Based on a novel Mademoiselle Fifi.
2011	France	A Child's Battle	Bas les cœurs	Robin Davis	Drama.

== Television series ==
Year	Country	Main title (Alternative title)	Original title (Original script)	Director	Subject
1996	France; Germany	The Alsatians or the Two Mathildes	Les Alsaciens ou les Deux Mathilde	Michel Favart	Drama, History.
