= List of Soviet films of 1945 =

A list of films produced in the Soviet Union in 1945 (see 1945 in film).

== 1945 ==
Title	Original title	Director	Cast	Genre	Notes
1945
The Call of Love	Близнецы	Konstantin Yudin	Lyudmila Tselikovskaya	Comedy	
The Cloth Peddler	Аршин мал алан	Rza Tahmasib	Rashid Behbudov	Musical	
Dark Is the Night	Однажды ночью	Boris Barnet	Irina Radchenko, Boris Andreyev, Ivan Kuznetsov, Aleksei Yudin	War drama	
Fifteen-Year-Old Captain	Пятнадцатилетний капитан	Vasily Zhuravlyov	Vsevolod Larionov	Adventure	
Girl No. 217	Человек № 217	Mikhail Romm	Yelena Kuzmina, Vladimir Balashov, Tatyana Barysheva, Heinrich Greif	Drama	Entered into the 1946 Cannes Film Festival
Guilty Without Guilt	Без вины виноватые	Vladimir Petrov			
Hello Moscow!	Здравствуй, Москва!	Sergei Yutkevich	Oleg Bobrov, Sergei Filippov, Pavel Kadochnikov, Nikolai Leonov	Musical	
It Happened in the Donbass	Это было в Донбассе	Leonid Lukov	Tatiana Okunevskaya	Drama	
Ivan the Terrible	Иван Грозный	Sergei Eisenstein	Nikolai Cherkasov, Lyudmila Tselikovskaya	Biopic	Part 1
Kashchey the Immortal	Кащей Бессмертный	Aleksandr Rou	Sergei Stolyarov	Fantasy	
The Lost Letter	Пропавшая грамота	Zinaida Brumberg and Valentina Brumberg	Sergei Martinson, Leonid Pirogov, Mikhail Yanshin, Boris Livanov	Animation	
Simple People	Простые люди	Grigori Kozintsev, Leonid Trauberg	Yuri Tolubeyev	War film	
The Turning Point	Великий перелом	Fridrikh Ermler	Mikhail Derzhavin, Pyotr Andriyevsky, Yuri Tolubeyev, Andrei Abrikosov	War film	One of the 1946 Palme d'Or winners.

== See also ==
- 1945 in the Soviet Union
