= Patrol (novel) =

1927 novel by Philip MacDonald

- First edition (US)
- Author: Philip MacDonald
- Language: English
- Genre: Military fiction
- Set in: Mesopotamia (1914–1918)
- Publisher: William Collins, Sons (UK); Harper & Brothers (US)
- Publication date: 1927
- Publication place: United Kingdom
- Media type: Print
- Pages: 245
- OCLC: 8021660

Patrol is a 1927 war novel by the British writer Philip MacDonald. It is set in Mesopotamia during the First World War, focusing on the psychological strain on a patrol of British soldiers when they become lost in the desert and surrounded by the enemy. It is sometimes known as Lost Patrol.

== Plot ==
Following the death of their Lieutenant, a platoon is left stranded in the hot and blazing desert. They are surrounded by their enemy, and do everything to try and survive. At the end, only the Sergeant is left following the death of the platoon.

== Adaptations ==
The novel was directly adapted into films on two occasions: a 1929 British silent film Lost Patrol directed by Walter Summers and starring Cyril McLaglen, and a 1934 American film The Lost Patrol directed by John Ford and starring Victor McLaglen, Boris Karloff and Reginald Denny.

The 1943 American film Sahara was based partly on Patrol, but also on an incident in the similar 1936 Soviet film The Thirteen. Sahara was remade as Last of the Comanches in 1953 and the American-Australian Sahara in 1995.

== Bibliography ==
- Low, Rachael. The History of the British Film, 1918-1929. George Allen & Unwin, 1971.
