= The Last Patrol =

The Last Patrol may refer to:

- another title of The Last Warrior (2000 film)
- "The Last Patrol", an episode of the miniseries Band of Brothers
- "The Last Patrol", an episode of the animated television series Batman: The Brave and the Bold

== See also ==
- The Lost Patrol (disambiguation)
