= Lost Patrol =

The Lost Patrol or Lost Patrol may refer to:

== Music ==
- The Lost Patrol, a band from New York, or their self-title album
- The Lost Patrol Band, earlier name of Swedish punk band Invasionen, or their self-titled album
- "Lost Patrol", a song by Big Country on their album The Crossing

== Films ==
- Lost Patrol (1929 film), a silent war film
- The Lost Patrol (1934 film), starring Victor McLaglen and Boris Karloff, remake of the 1929 film

== Other ==
- Patrol (or Lost Patrol), a 1927 novel by Philip MacDonald which was adapted to the 1929 and 1934 films
- Lost Patrol (video game), a video game for the Commodore Amiga, Atari ST and DOS
- US Navy training Flight 19 which disappeared in December 1945
- The Lost Patrol (Canada), a 1910 Royal North-West Mounted Police patrol led by Inspector Francis J. Fitzgerald, all members of which died
- "The Lost Patrol", episode 37 of Exosquad
- Lost Patrol, a board game briefly published by Games Workshop in 2000, with a second edition released in 2016
