= Sahara (1943 American film) =

1943 film by Zoltán Korda

- Theatrical release poster
- Directed by: Zoltán Korda
- Written by: James O'Hanlon (adaptation)
- Screenplay by: John Howard Lawson; Zoltan Korda
- Story by: Philip MacDonald (as Philip Macdonald)
- Based on: The Thirteen; 1936 Soviet film by Mikhail Romm
- Produced by: Harry Joe Brown
- Starring: Humphrey Bogart; Bruce Bennett; J. Carrol Naish; Lloyd Bridges
- Cinematography: Rudolph Maté
- Edited by: Charles Nelson
- Music by: Miklós Rózsa
- Color process: Black and white
- Production company: Columbia Pictures
- Distributed by: Columbia Pictures
- Release date: November 11, 1943
- Running time: 98 minutes
- Country: United States
- Language: English
- Box office: $2.3 million

Sahara is a 1943 American action war film directed by Zoltán Korda and starring Humphrey Bogart as an American tank commander in Libya who, along with a handful of Allied soldiers, tries to defend an isolated well with a limited supply of water from a Libyan Afrika Korps battalion during the Western Desert Campaign of World War II.

The story is based on the novel Patrol by Philip MacDonald, and an incident depicted in the 1936 Soviet film The Thirteen by Mikhail Romm. The adaptation is by John Howard Lawson, who later was a member of the blacklisted Hollywood Ten. Sahara was remade by André de Toth as a Western called Last of the Comanches (1953), and four decades later by Brian Trenchard-Smith as the American-Australian television film Sahara (1995). Nine Men, released by Ealing Studios on 22 February 1943, has a similar basic plot line.

Critics praised the film for its blend of action, suspense and poignancy. J. Carrol Naish earned an Oscar nomination for Best Supporting Actor, Rudolph Maté was nominated for Best Cinematography (Black-and-White), and John Livadary was nominated for Best Sound.

== Plot ==
In 1942, the crew of Lulubelle, a United States Army M3 Lee tank attached to the British Eighth Army and commanded by Master Sergeant Joe Gunn, become separated from their unit during a general retreat from German forces after the fall of Tobruk. Forced to head south across the Libyan Desert, Gunn and his crew, Doyle and "Waco", come across a bombed-out field hospital, where they pick up British Army medical officer Captain Halliday, four Commonwealth soldiers and Free French Corporal Leroux. Halliday, the only officer, cedes command to the more experienced Gunn.

Riding atop the tank, the group comes upon Sudan Defence Force Sergeant Major Tambul and his Italian prisoner, Giuseppe. Tambul volunteers to lead them to a well at Hassan Barani. Gunn insists that they leave the Italian behind but soon relents and lets Giuseppe join them.

En route, the tank is strafed by Luftwaffe pilot Captain von Schletow, seriously wounding Clarkson, one of the Commonwealth soldiers. Von Schletow is shot down and captured. Arriving at Hassan Barani, the group finds the well is dry, and Clarkson succumbs to his wounds.

Tambul guides them to another desert well at Bir Acroma, but it provides only a trickle of water. While the group collect as much water as they can, the well runs dry. German scouts arrive in a half-track. Gunn captures two of them and learns that a German mechanized battalion, desperate for water, is following close behind. Gunn persuades his men to make a stand to delay the Germans while Waco takes the half-track for reinforcements. Gunn releases the German soldiers to carry back an offer to their commander: food for water, giving the false impression there is plenty of water even though by this time the well has gone dry.

When the German battalion arrives, a battle of wills begins between Gunn and the German commander, Major von Falken. Gunn keeps up the pretense that there is abundant water and changes his offer to swap water for guns. Von Falken rejects the terms and mounts several frontal attacks; there are many German casualties but the attacks also takes a toll on the defenders. During one attack, von Schletow stabs Giuseppe when the Italian denounces fascism and refuses to help him escape. Before dying, Giuseppe manages to warn Gunn. Tambul chases von Schletow down and kills him before he can reach the German lines, but is shot dead. After a second parley between Leroux and von Falken ends in another stalemate, von Falken has Leroux shot in the back as the Frenchman returns to his own side. Gunn and his men return fire, killing von Falken.

The Germans begin what appears to be a final assault, but turns into a full-blown surrender. They drop their weapons and claw across the sand towards the well. To Gunn's astonishment, a German artillery shell that exploded near the well has tapped into a source of water, filling the well again. While the surviving Germans drink, Gunn and Bates, the only Allied survivors, disarm them. Later, as they march their prisoners east, Gunn and Bates are met by Allied troops guided by Waco. They receive news of the Allied victory at the First Battle of El Alamein, turning back Erwin Rommel's Afrika Korps.

== Cast ==
- Humphrey Bogart as M/Sgt. Joe Gunn
- Bruce Bennett as Waco Hoyt
- J. Carrol Naish as Giuseppe
- Lloyd Bridges as Fred Clarkson
- Rex Ingram as Sgt. Major Tambul
- Richard Aherne as Capt. Jason Halliday (as Richard Nugent)
- Dan Duryea as Jimmy Doyle
- Carl Harbord as Marty Williams
- Patrick O'Moore as Osmond "Ozzie" Bates
- Louis Mercier as Jean Leroux, "Frenchie" (as Louis T. Mercier)
- Guy Kingsford as Peter Stegman
- Kurt Kreuger as Captain von Schletow (as Kurt Krueger)
- John Wengraf as Major Hans Von Falken

== Production ==
The lead role was initially offered to Gary Cooper, Glenn Ford and Brian Donlevy before Bogart. According to Hedda Hopper, Donlevy's wife, Marjorie Lane, was expecting a baby and he did not want to be stuck on location. Variety, however, reported that Donlevy was tired of making war films and Bogart was weary of gangster roles, so the actors swapped assignments; Donlevy stepped into My Friend Curley (though he was replaced by Cary Grant) and Bogart took Somewhere in the Sahara (the film's working title).

Production began on January 29, 1943, and wrapped up on April 17. The cast and crew spent eleven weeks on location in the Imperial County, California, portion of Anza-Borrego Desert State Park near the Salton Sea. Their base was at the Planter's Hotel in Brawley, California, about 50 mi (80 km) east of the location. One hundred enlisted men and equipment of the United States 4th Armored Division's 84th Reconnaissance Battalion (Armored), then training at the Desert Training Center, were used as extras. The film's dedication is to the "IV Armored Corps of the Army Ground Forces", the training organization to which the 4th Armored Division was attached in early 1943. The soldiers were billeted in tents at the location.

Lulubelle was a 28-ton (25.4 t) M3 (Medium) Lee tank with 30 and 50 caliber machine guns, a 37mm cannon in the turret and a 75 millimeter cannon in the right sponson. Because no German equipment was available, American equipment was substituted and dressed with German markings. The aircraft that attacks the tank was an early Allison-powered P-51 Mustang. The German Sdkf-251 half-track and MG-34 machine guns were an American M2 with a M49 ring mounted with a Vickers medium machine gun.

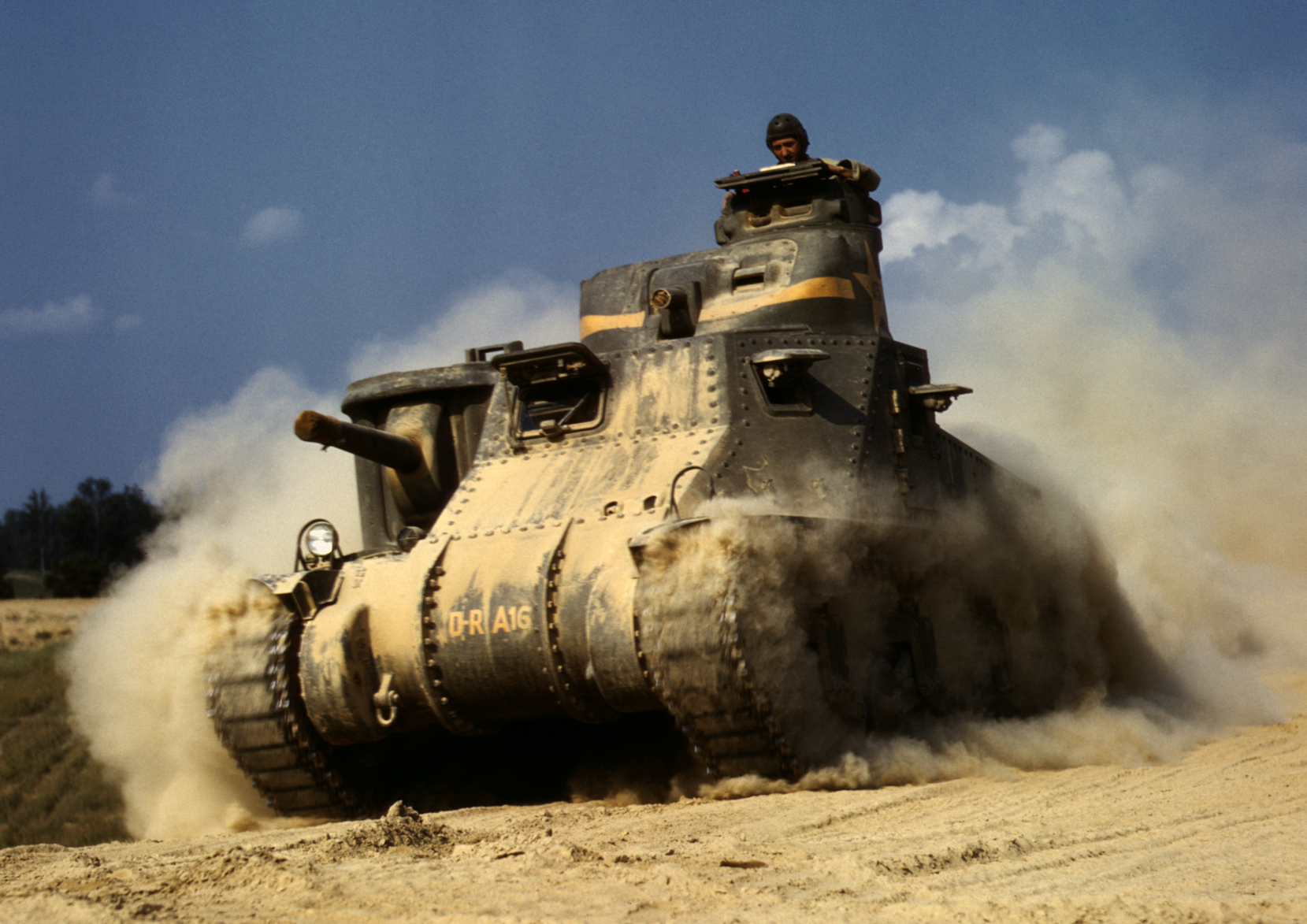
M3 medium tank of the type used in the film.

In 1992, Kurt Kreuger was quoted by the San Francisco Chronicle on the emotions inherent in making the film, in which he portrayed a stereotypical Nazi:

I was running across the dunes when Tambul jumped on top of me and pressed my head into the sand to suffocate me. Only Zoltán forgot to yell cut, and Ingram was so emotionally caught up in the scene that he kept pressing my face harder and harder.

Finally, I went unconscious. Nobody knew this. Even the crew was transfixed, watching this dramatic 'killing.' If Zoltán hadn't finally said cut, as an afterthought, it would have been all over for me.

The production was beset by the usual difficulties on a desert location: sunburn, sandstorms, and heat. Korda had 2,000 tons of sand hauled onto the set to cover an area of hard-packed soil. Ripples and swirls in the sand were enhanced by spray-painting the sand and then blowing it with a wind machine. Similarly, shadows were spray-painted on the hills to make them stand out. Makeup artist Henry Pringle devised a technique to imitate facial perspiration by coating the actors' faces with vaseline and then spraying them with water. Bogart's third wife, Mayo Methot, the only woman on location, reportedly brought him lunch every day from Brawley. Some of the cast went to nearby Mexicali for dinners. No women appear in the film.

== Historical background ==
Bogart's character makes reference to events that occurred in May–June 1942. The British had received many American M3 tanks (the tank seen in the film), and a small group of American advisors and crews trained them in the use of the equipment.

The British were routed at the Battle of Gazala, an important battle of the Western Desert Campaign, fought around the port of Tobruk. As shown in Sahara, many of their tanks were damaged and had to be abandoned due to the 8th Army's retreat. Field Marshal Rommel pursued them into Egypt. The British were finally able to check Rommel's advance at the First Battle of El Alamein. The two Allied survivors learn of this victory at the end of the film.

== Reception ==
Reviews of Sahara generally were positive, with Variety noting, "Script [adapted by James O'Hanlon from a story by Philip MacDonald] is packed with pithy dialog, lusty action and suspense, and logically and well-devised situations avoiding ultra-theatrics throughout. It's an all-male cast, but absence of romance is not missed in the rapid-fire unfolding of vivid melodrama."

Critic Nelson B. Bell, in The Washington Post, called it "one of the best-balanced of the starker war pictures ... that by turns is tortured, compassionate, thrilling and always of engrossing interest."

The Boston Globe called the film "brilliantly acted ... 'Sahara' doesn't spare the punches–they hit you in the face emotionally and it is literally impossible to sit unmoved through this vivid story. There isn't a smidgen of love interest in the picture and not a woman in the cast. This is war. There are deaths and tragedies—but there's a final ironic triumph, too. Sergt. Gunn holds the power of life or death over an Italian prisoner, and when J. Carroll Naish pleads for his life, the scene is one of the most poignant of the year's film moments."

Bosley Crowther in his review for The New York Times concentrated on the star-power of Bogart. "Those rugged, indomitable qualities which Humphrey Bogart has so masterfully displayed in most of his recent pictures—and even before, in his better gangster roles—have been doubled and concentrated in 'Sahara,' a Columbia film about warfare in the Libyan desert, which came to the Capitol yesterday. And a capital picture it is, too—as rugged as Mr. Bogart all the way and in a class with that memorable picture which it plainly resembles, The Lost Patrol."

New York Herald Tribune critic Otis Guernsey Jr. praised Bogart's understated style, calling it "exactly what is needed in war melodramas, which have too often been overstated to the point of ridicule. It has been used to best advantage in this instance. It is good to see a portrayal of an American soldier who looks on the war with a certain amount of distaste, but who faces both death and good fortune with persistent courage and realistic calm." Korda's direction was also called "excellent ... The action and pictorial footage is more important than the dialogue ..."

John Livadary was nominated for the Oscar for Best Sound, Rudolph Maté for Best Cinematography (Black-and-White), and J. Carrol Naish for Best Supporting Actor.

== Remake ==
In 1995 a TV remake was released with Jim Belushi in the role Sgt. Joe Gunn.

== Bibliography ==
- Barr, Niell. Pendulum of War: The Three Battles of El Alamein. Woodstock, New York: Overlook Press, 2005. ISBN 978-1-58567-738-2.
- Evans, Alun. Brassey's Guide to War Films. Dulles, Virginia: Potomac Books, 2000. ISBN 1-57488-263-5.
- Schatz, Thomas. Boom and Bust: American Cinema in the 1940s. Oakland, California: University of California Press, 1999. ISBN 978-0-52022-130-7.

== See also ==
- List of American films of 1943
