= O Gênio do Crime (film) =

- Theatrical release poster
- Directed by: Lipe Binder
- Screenplay by: Ana Reber
- Based on: O Gênio do Crime by João Carlos Marinho
- Starring: Francisco Galvão; Bella Alelaf; Breno Kaneto; Samuel Estevam; Marcos Veras; Ailton Graça; Douglas Silva
- Production companies: Boutique Filmes; Globo Filmes
- Distributed by: Paris Filmes
- Release date: 14 May 2026
- Running time: 90 minutes
- Country: Brazil
- Language: Portuguese

O Gênio do Crime is a 2026 Brazilian mystery adventure family film directed by Lipe Binder with screenplay written by Ana Reber. Based on the 1969 novel of the same name by João Carlos Marinho, the film revolves around a group of friends who start investigating a World Cup sticker counterfeiting scheme in São Paulo. The film was produced by Boutique Filmes and Globo Filmes, and was released in Brazilian theaters on May 14, 2026.

== Plot ==
During the 2026 FIFA World Cup, Gordo and his friends endeavor to complete the sticker album at their school. After acquiring the rare Vinícius Júnior sticker, the group becomes embroiled in an unexpected situation upon discovering a counterfeiting scheme that threatens the credibility of the manufacturer responsible for the album. Determined to investigate the matter, the youngsters traverse the streets of São Paulo in search of answers. Alongside the enigmatic Mr. Mistério, they immerse themselves in a plot replete with suspense, adventure, and humor, all while striving to unmask the individual behind the criminal operation.

== Cast ==
- Francisco Galvão as João
- Bella Alelaf as Berenice
- Breno Kaneto as Pituca
- Samuel Estevam as Edmundo
- Marcos Veras as Mr. Mistério
- Ailton Graça as Seu Tomé
- Douglas Silva as Caíque
- Rafael Losso as money changer
- Marcelo Goes as Almeidinha
- Estevam Nabote as Atlas
- Fafá Rennó as João's mother
- Thelmo Fernandes as João's father
- Larissa Nunes as Márcia

== Reception ==
Lauro Roth, from the website NoSet, said that O Gênio do Crime is "a most gratifying and unexpected surprise", an adaptation that retains "all the look and feel of a 1970s and 1980s film" and "steers clear of the tediousness and excessive caution of today's productions". He highlights as "surreal" and full of "charm" the fact that the young protagonists roam through São Paulo "without cell phones", in a screenless world that "makes us think more, dream more, and truly live life". Although he notes that the juvenile performances are "sometimes forced", he praises the "delicious chemistry" among the cast and the performance of Douglas Silva, and concludes that the film has "a well-crafted plot that invites us to investigate alongside the gang".
