= Breakfast with the Leader =

1953 film

- Directed by: Anatoli Rybakov
- Written by: Ivan Turgenev (play)
- Cinematography: Boris Petrov
- Production company: Mosfilm
- Release date: 1953
- Country: Soviet Union
- Language: Russian

Breakfast with the Leader (Russian: Завтрак у предводителя, romanized: Zavtrak u predvoditelya) is a 1953 Soviet drama film directed by Anatoli Rybakov and starring Tatyana Barysheva.

== Cast ==
- Tatyana Barysheva as Kaurova
- Andrey Fayt
- Aleksandr Khvylya as Alupkin
- Grigoriy Shpigel as Balagaleyev
- Mikhail Troyanovsky as Pekhteryev

== Bibliography ==
- Goble, Alan. The Complete Index to Literary Sources in Film. Walter de Gruyter, 1999.
