= Girl No. 217 =

1945 Soviet war film

- Film poster
- Directed by: Mikhail Romm
- Written by: Mikhail Romm; Yevgeny Gabrilovich
- Starring: Yelena Kuzmina; Vladimir Balashov; Tatyana Barysheva; Heinrich Greif
- Cinematography: Boris Volchek; Era Savelyeva
- Music by: Aram Khachaturian
- Production company: Mosfilm
- Release date: 9 April 1945
- Running time: 99 min.
- Country: Soviet Union
- Language: Russian

Girl No. 217 (full film)

Girl No. 217 (Russian: Человек № 217, translit. Chelovek No. 217) is a 1945 Soviet war drama film directed by Mikhail Romm. It was entered into the 1946 Cannes Film Festival.

An anti-Nazi film, it depicted a Russian girl enslaved to an inhuman German family. She is even robbed of her name and forced to answer to "No. 217". Subplots depict abuse directed at other POWs. This reflected the use by Nazis of Ostarbeiter as slave labour, including as family servants.

== Plot ==
The film begins in 1944 with a parade of German prisoners of war. Among the crowd of Soviet citizens observing them is Tatyana Krylova, who listens to a woman comment on the prisoners' unkempt appearance, calling them barbarians. When the woman points out a limping soldier with an intellectual demeanor, suggesting he may have been forced into the war, Tatyana interjects, stating she has seen such "civilized" Germans before, and all turned out to be killers. She then begins recounting her story.

In 1942, Tatyana, assigned the number 217, and her friend Klava Vasilyeva are forcibly taken to Germany as Ostarbeiters. Klava is sent to work in a factory, while Tatyana becomes a maid for the Krauss family, who own a grocery store. Another Ostarbeiter, Sergey, a mathematician, works for the Krausses as a stablehand. The family, including their daughter Lotte and her fiancé, Rudolf Peschke, treat Tatyana with disdain, subjecting her to heavy labor and constant humiliation. Despite the hardship, Tatyana finds hope in Sergey’s plan to save leftover bread to prepare for an escape in spring, intending to take Klava with them. Klava's situation at the factory is even worse, as the workers are frequently beaten.

Meanwhile, Lotte and Rudolf plan to marry, but Rudolf, seeking to appear wealthy, pressures the Krausses for money, knowing they hold a significant sum left with them by a Jewish acquaintance. Tensions escalate as Rudolf resorts to abusing Sergey, who secretly continues his mathematical work, leading to Sergey’s mental decline. Matters worsen when Max, the Krausses’ son, returns from the Eastern Front with his friend Kurt, revealing himself to be a hardened and brutal soldier. Conflict erupts over the hidden money, culminating in Max and Kurt murdering Sergey after falsely accusing him of defaming Germany. That night, during a Soviet air raid, Tatyana kills Max and Kurt in their sleep and escapes with Klava. The Krauss household is destroyed in the bombing, but Klava succumbs to her injuries during their journey. Tatyana eventually finds refuge in a train carrying injured Ostarbeiters back to the Soviet Union.

Returning to 1944, it is revealed that the limping soldier Tatyana observed is Rudolf, likely conscripted after Germany declared total war. Tatyana delivers a poignant speech, asserting that Germans cannot absolve themselves by blaming Adolf Hitler alone. She emphasizes their responsibility to remember the horrors of war and its devastating consequences forever.

== Cast ==
- Yelena Kuzmina as Tanya Krylova (Nr. 217)
- Vladimir Balashov as Max Krauss
- Tatyana Barysheva as Greta Krauss
- Heinrich Greif as Kurt Kahger
- Anastasiya Lissianskaya as Klava Vasilyeva
- Grigory Mikhaylov as prisoner Nr. 225
- Lidiya Sukharevskaya as Lotta Krauss
- Peter Suthanov as Rudolph Peschke
- Vasili Zajchikov as scientist
