= Triumph Over Violence =

Ordinary Fascism
- English theatrical release poster
- Directed by: Mikhail Romm
- Written by: Mikhail Romm; Maya Turovskaya; Yuri Khanyutin
- Narrated by: Mikhail Romm
- Cinematography: German Lavrov
- Edited by: Valentina Kulagina; Mikhail Romm
- Music by: Alemdar Karamanov
- Release date: 1965
- Running time: 138 minutes; 133 minutes (Germany); 82 minutes (US); 129 minutes (Japan)
- Country: Soviet Union
- Language: Russian

Ordinary Fascism (Russian: Обыкновенный фашизм, romanized: Obyknovennyy fashizm), or Triumph Over Violence is a 1965 Soviet film directed by Mikhail Romm. The film is also known as Echo of the Jackboot in the United Kingdom. The film uses archival footage to depict the rise and fall of fascism in Nazi Germany.

== Style ==
The film's style was largely influenced by the work of Soviet documentarian Esfir Shub. Shub is regarded as the creator of the compilation film, which uses existing footage to depict historical events. Shub's most famous compilation film, The Fall of the Romanov Dynasty, gathered newsreel footage from pre-revolutionary Russia to depict the decline of the Czar and valorize the Russian Revolution. Inspired by Shub's state-approved documentary style, Romm culled material from German archives, archives of post-war antifascist organizations, photo archives and archives seized from the German military to create his documentary.

Romm used novel technologies in the documentary. With reverse playback, Romm was able to repeat sequences like the kiss given by a Nazi party official to industrialist Alfried Krupp, which Romm used to highlight the relationship between the Nazi party and organized capital. Romm also used freeze-frame shots to focus on moments from the archival footage.

Aside from co-writing, co-editing, and directing the film, Romm also provided the film's narration. Initially, had wanted the narration done by someone else, but when his collaborators heard working versions of his voice-over, they encouraged him to do it. Romm's unique vocabulary and intonation became one of the film's main notable features.

== Importance ==
Rather than treating Nazism only as a foreign enemy defeated in war, Romm examined how propaganda, conformity, bureaucracy, leader worship and everyday compromise allowed dictatorship to develop. The Russian title, Ordinary Fascism, better expresses this central idea: fascism is made possible through seemingly ordinary social behavior.

Although the film officially concerns Nazi Germany, Soviet viewers could recognize familiar features: the personality cult, staged mass rallies, ritualized enthusiasm and the suppression of independent judgment.

It gave a large Soviet audience powerful images of the Holocaust. The documentary showed archival evidence of persecution, mass shootings, concentration camps and the murder of European Jews.

Romm repeatedly isolates individual faces within crowds and studies personal photographs taken by German soldiers. This challenges the idea that people lose responsibility when acting as part of a mass.

The movie reached a very broad public. According to the Russian Museum of Cinema, approximately 40 million people saw the film during its theatrical distribution.

== Major awards ==
Golden Dove (Goldene Taube): The film won this top prize for documentaries at the 8th Leipzig International Documentary Film Festival in 1965.

FIPRESCI Prize: It received the International Critics' Prize at the same Leipzig festival.

Jury Prize (Documentary Section): It was honored at the All-Union Film Festival in 1966, a premier annual Soviet cinema event.

== Influence ==
Director Vadim Abdrashitov, who studied under Mikhail Romm at VGIK, later spoke highly of Ordinary Fascism, describing it as a great directorial and personal achievement by Romm.

== See also ==
- Anti-war film
