= Yelena Kuzmina =

Soviet actress

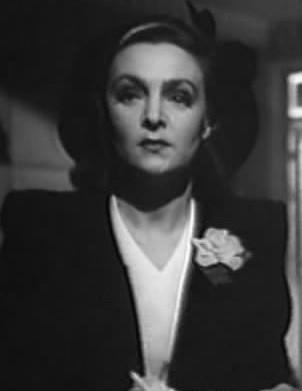
- Kuzmina in 1947
- Born: Yelena Aleksandrovna Kuzmina; 17 February 1909; Tiflis, Russian Empire
- Died: 15 October 1979 (aged 70); Moscow, Soviet Union
- Occupation: Actress
- Spouse(s): Boris Barnet; Mikhail Romm

Yelena Aleksandrovna Kuzmina (Russian: Еле́на Алекса́ндровна Кузьмина́; 17 February 1909 – 15 October 1979) was a Soviet and Russian film actress. She was People's Artist of the RSFSR (1950).

In 1929, she made her film debut in the role of the communal resident Louise in the film “The New Babylon ” by Grigory Kozintsev and Leonid Trauberg, showing herself "as an actress of original dramatic and comedic talent".

== Filmography ==
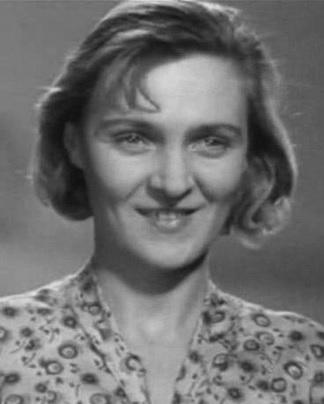
Kuzmina in 1936

- The New Babylon (1929) as saleswoman Louise Poirier
- Alone (1931) as teacher Yelena Kuzmina
- Horizon (1932) as Rosie
- Outskirts (1933) as Manka Greshina
- By the Bluest of Seas (1936) as fisherwoman Mariya
- The Thirteen (1936) as Marya Nikolayevna Zhuravlyova
- Dream (1941) as Anna
- Girl No. 217 (1944) as Tatyana Krylova – Stalin Prize second degree (1946)
- The Russian Question (1947) as Jessie West – Stalin Prize first degree (1948)
- Secret Mission (1950) as Marta – Stalin Prize first degree (1951)
- Attack from the Sea (1953) as Emma Hamilton
- Trouble (1977) as Alevtina Ivanovna Kuligina
