= Leonid Gubanov =

Russian actor (1928–2004)

- Леонид Губанов
- Gubanov in The Seagull (1974)
- Born: 2 August 1928; Rybatskoye, Russian SFSR, Soviet Union
- Died: 24 February 2004 (aged 75); Moscow, Russia
- Occupations: Actor; theater director; spoken word artist
- Years active: 1954–2004
- Awards: (1989) (1969)

Leonid Ivanovich Gubanov (Note: Russian: Леонид Иванович Губанов, romanized: Leonid Ivanovich Gubanov) (2 August 1928 – 24 February 2004) was a Soviet Russian actor, theater director, and master of spoken word performance.

Born in village of Rybatskoye in Leningrad Oblast (now in the Nevsky District of St. Petersburg).

He was awarded with the People's Artist of the USSR in 1989.

Gubanov died on 24 February 2004. He is interred in Troyekurovskoye Cemetery.

== Selected filmography ==
- Princess Mary as Grushnitsky (1954)
- A Weary Road as Dmitri Orestovich (1956)
- Murder on Dante Street as Madam Coupot's son (1956)
- The Cossacks as Dmitri Olenin (1961)
- A Long Happy Life as Trofimov (1966)

== Decorations and awards ==
- Medal "In Commemoration of the 850th Anniversary of Moscow" (1997)
- Order of Honour (1998)
- Order of Friendship (2003)
