= Boule de Suif (1934 film) =

- Russian: Пышка
- Directed by: Mikhail Romm
- Written by: Mikhail Romm; Guy de Maupassant
- Based on: Boule de Suif by Guy de Maupassant
- Starring: Galina Sergeyeva; Andrey Fayt; Faina Ranevskaya; Pyotr Repnin; Tatyana Okunevskaya
- Cinematography: Boris Volchek
- Music by: Mikhail Chulaki
- Release date: 1934
- Running time: 70 minutes
- Country: Soviet Union

Boule de Suif (Russian: Пышка) is a 1934 Soviet drama silent film directed and written by Mikhail Romm. It is an adaptation of eponymous short story by Guy de Maupassant.

Boule de Suif (full film)

A group of French capitalists leave Rouen, occupied by Prussia during the Franco-Prussian War. They are accompanied by a pretty woman.

== Plot ==
Set in France during the Franco-Prussian War of 1870, the film follows a group of travelers fleeing the warzone in a stagecoach heading to unoccupied France. Among the passengers is Elizabeth Rousset, a patriotic French prostitute nicknamed "Boule de Suif" ("Butterball"). She is treated with disdain by the other passengers, a mix of nuns, aristocrats, and bourgeoisie. When the stagecoach is stopped by a Prussian officer, he demands a sexual favor from Elizabeth. As a staunch patriot, she refuses, viewing him as an enemy invader.

The officer retaliates by preventing the stagecoach from continuing its journey. The once-hostile passengers suddenly feign kindness toward Elizabeth, pressuring her to submit to the officer’s demands so they can proceed. Reluctantly, Elizabeth agrees. The next morning, after her sacrifice has allowed the journey to resume, the passengers revert to their judgmental and hypocritical behavior, openly mocking her. The only act of kindness comes from a young German soldier escorting the stagecoach, who offers Elizabeth a loaf of bread in silent recognition of her sacrifice.

== Cast ==
- Galina Sergeyeva as Mlle. Elizabeth Rousset (Boule-de-suif)
- Andrey Fayt as Prussian Officer
- Faina Ranevskaya as Mme. Loiseau
- Pyotr Repnin as Lamadon, miller
- Tatyana Okunevskaya as Mme Carre-Lamadon
- Mikhail Mukhin as Count de Breville
- Anatoliy Goryunov as Louiseau, wine merchant
- Karl Gurnyak as German soldier
- Valentina Kuznetsova as Maid
- Vladimir Lavrinovich as Cornudet
- Vladimir Osenev as German soldier (uncredited)
