= Nine Days in One Year =

- Directed by: Mikhail Romm
- Written by: Daniil Khrabrovitsky; Mikhail Romm
- Produced by: Goskino
- Starring: Aleksey Batalov; Innokenty Smoktunovsky; Yevgeniy Yevstigneyev
- Narrated by: Zinovi Gerdt
- Cinematography: German Lavrov
- Edited by: Yeva Ladyzhenskaya
- Music by: Dzhon Ter-Tatevosyan
- Distributed by: Mosfilm; Artkino Pictures (1964, USA, subtitled); RUSCICO (2004, worldwide, DVD)
- Release date: 5 March 1962
- Running time: 111 min.
- Country: Soviet Union
- Language: Russian

Nine Days in One Year (Russian: Девять дней одного года) is a 1962 Soviet black-and-white drama film directed by Mikhail Romm about nuclear particle physics, physicists and their relationships. The film is based on true events. It won the Crystal Globe Award in 1962.

== Plot summary ==
Two young physicists and old friends — the possessed experimental physicist Dmitri Gusev and the skeptical theoretical physicist Ilya Kulikov — conduct nuclear studies at a research institute in Siberia. Dmitri leads the research started by his teacher Sintsov, who has received a deadly dose of radiation as a result of an experiment. Dmitri has also been irradiated. Doctors warn him that further irradiation might kill him as well. Meanwhile, his friend Ilya and Lyolya, a love interest of Dmitri, have developed a romantic relationship. The enamoured couple is getting prepared for the wedding and looking for an opportunity to inform Dmitri. When they finally meet, Dmitri already suspects Lyolya and Ilya are planning to marry and treats them coldly. Caught up in self-contradictions, Lyolya tries to understand Dmitri's true feelings for her, only to learn about his terrible diagnosis. Realizing that she still loves Dmitri, Lyolya cancels the wedding to Ilya in order to marry Dmitri.

Despite the health warnings, Dmitri continues with his experiments in fusion power. After a number of failures, he turns to Ilya for help. Whilst carrying out the experiment successfully, Dmitri receives a new radiation dose. He tries to hide this fact from everyone, including his wife Lyolya who is misinterpreting his sudden isolation, though the truth eventually rises to the surface. The research work has been continued by Ilya. Dmitri's health is getting worse, but he decides to fight his illness to the end and agrees to undergo bone marrow transplantation.

== Production ==
The film's working title was 365 Days. Mikhail Romm assembled a team of people with whom he had never previously worked before.

Popular actors Yury Yakovlev and Alexey Batalov were hired for the main roles. Before the filming started, Yakovlev was hospitalized and had to be replaced with Innokenty Smoktunovsky. For the main female part a young and little-known actress Tatyana Lavrova of the Sovremennik Theatre was invited. The role of Lyolya was Tatiana’s best known role in her film career, later she mainly devoted herself to the theater.

I had great interest in working on my portrayal of Dmitry Gusev. The life of this atomic scientist is filled with a persistent, meaningful and moreover with quite an inconspicuous feat. The role of Gusev especially appeals to me the fact that he is a modern man, deeply intelligent, we can say – a man of the new Soviet formation.

— Alexei Batalov

The screenplay was written by Romm jointly with Khrabrovitsky. The cinematographer of the film was a newcomer German Lavrov. In many respects, the picture became a new word in the Soviet cinema. Experts have noted an unusual interpretation of the theme song and sound engineering - in fact there is almost no music, there is only a certain sound accompaniment of the technological sense. The sets of the film were also innovative.

The filming took 6 months. The premiere was on 5 March 1962 at the Rossiya Theatre in Moscow.

7 actors participated in the film who were later awarded the title of People's Artist of the USSR: Batalov (1976), Smoktunovsky (1974), Plotnikov (1966), Blinnikov (1963), Gerdt (1990), Evstigneev (1983), Durov (1990). The director Mikhail Romm became the People's Artist of the USSR in 1950.

Alexey Batalov witnessed that numerous dark parts which were conceived by the authors were removed from the film per censorship requirements. As a result, an episode was removed where Gusev visits his mother's grave, a possible indication that in the finale the disease leads to Gusev becoming blind.

== Reception ==
- Hoberman, J. (2000-11-12). "FILM; From a Soviet Era That Dared to Defy The Ruling Dogma". The New York Times.

== Cast ==
- Aleksey Batalov as Dmitri Gusev, nuclear physicist
- Innokenty Smoktunovsky as Ilya Kulikov, nuclear physicist
- Tatyana Lavrova as Lyolya
- Nikolai Plotnikov as professor Sintsov
- Sergei Blinnikov as Paul D. Butov, director of the Institute
- Yevgeniy Yevstigneyev as Nikolai Ivanovich, physicist
- Mikhail Kozakov as Valery Ivanovich, physicist
- Valentin Nikulin as young physicist
- Pavel Shpringfeld as physicist
- Aleksandr Pelevin as physicist
- Yevgeni Teterin as professor Pokrovsky, surgeon
- Nikolai Sergeyev as Gusev's Father
- Ada Vojtsik as Maria Tikhonovna, Sintsov's wife
- Valentina Belyayeva as doctor
- Igor Yasulovich as Fedorov, physicist
- Lyusyena Ovchinnikova as Nura, Gusev's younger sister

Off-screen voice by Zinovi Gerdt, narrator
