= Dolgy put =

A Long Road
- Russian: Долгий путь
- Directed by: Leonid Gaidai; Valentin Nevzorov
- Written by: Boris Brodsky; Mikhail Romm
- Produced by: Dmitry Zalbstein
- Starring: Sergey Yakovlev; Vladimir Belokurov; Kyunna Ignatova; Leonid Gubanov; Nikifor Kolofidin
- Cinematography: Sergei Poluyanov
- Edited by: Eva Ladyzhenskaya
- Music by: Yury Biryukov
- Production company: Mosfilm
- Release date: 1956
- Running time: 80 min.
- Country: Soviet Union
- Language: Russian

Dolgy put (Russian: Долгий путь, lit. 'A Long Road') is a 1956 Soviet historical romance film directed by Leonid Gaidai and Valentin Nevzorov. The film is loosely based on some Siberian short stories by Vladimir Korolenko.

== Plot ==
The stationmaster Kruglikov fired at his boss, who wanted him to go along with him as a matchmaker to Kruglikov 's belle, Raissa, and as a result he was exiled to a remote Siberian settlement. After some time a political exile is transported to the settlement, which turns out to be Raissa. The two have several minutes together and then she is on her way

== Cast ==
- Sergei Yakovlev as Vasili Kruglikov
- Vladimir Belokurov as Latkin
- Kyunna Ignatova as Raisa Fedoseyeva
- Leonid Gubanov as Dmitri Orestovich
- Nikifor Kolofidin as Vassili's Father
- Aleksandr Antonov as Raissa's Father
- Apollon Yachnitsky as Arabin
- Ivan Ryzhov as gendarme
- Ekaterina Mazurova as Raisa's mother
