= The Cossacks (1961 film) =

1961 film

The Cossacks (Казаки)
- Film poster
- Directed by: Vasili Pronin
- Written by: Viktor Shklovsky
- Based on: The Cossacks; 1864 novel by Leo Tolstoy
- Starring: Leonid Gubanov; Boris Andreyev; Zinaida Kiriyenko; Eduard Bredun; Boris Novikov
- Cinematography: Igor Gelein; Valentin Zakharov
- Edited by: Ye. Kamagorova
- Music by: Gavriil Popov
- Production company: Mosfilm
- Release date: 1961
- Running time: 97 minutes
- Country: Soviet Union
- Language: Russian

The Cossacks (Russian: Казаки, romanized: Kazaki) is a 1961 Soviet romantic drama film directed by Vasili Pronin. It was entered into the 1961 Cannes Film Festival. It is based on Leo Tolstoy's 1864 novel of the same name.

== Plot ==
Young Moscow nobleman Dmitry Andreevich Olenin, after squandering half of his inheritance, joins the Caucasian infantry regiment as a junior officer cadet, seeking refuge from the temptations of Moscow's high society. Stationed near the Terek River, which divides the positions of the Cossacks and the Chechens, Olenin is billeted in the home of a Cossack cornet. Among the household is Maryana, the cornet's daughter, who is expected to marry Lukashka Shirokov, a daring and brave young Cossack. Initially treated coldly by the villagers, Olenin gradually wins their acceptance through his generosity and open nature. A key figure in this transformation is Eroshka, an elder Cossack who quickly befriends Olenin. Their bond grows as they hunt together, with Dmitry marveling at the beauty of the surrounding nature and the simplicity of Cossack life. Olenin also avoids the debauched habits of his fellow officers, preferring to spend his time hunting or reflecting on his place within this vibrant yet insular community.

As Olenin becomes captivated by Maryana, he struggles with his feelings while observing her impending wedding preparations. Realizing he must act, he finally confesses his love and proposes, leaving the decision to her parents. However, duty calls before he can secure their blessing. Olenin joins a group of Cossacks pursuing a band of abreks, during which Lukashka is fatally wounded in the skirmish. The news devastates Maryana, who blames Olenin for Lukashka's death, viewing him as indirectly responsible. Heartbroken and understanding that any hope of a future with Maryana is lost, Olenin decides to leave the stanitsa. As he departs, he is bid farewell by the sorrowful Eroshka, whose sadness underscores the young officer's poignant realization of his alienation and inability to fully integrate into the Cossack way of life.

== Cast ==
- Leonid Gubanov - Dmitri Olenin
- Boris Andreyev - Eroshka
- Zinaida Kiriyenko - Maryana
- Eduard Bredun - Lukashka
- Boris Novikov - Nazarka
- Vera Yenyutina
- Konstantin Gradopolov
- German Kachin - Vanyusha
- I. Men - Ustenka
- Vsevolod Safonov
- Aleksandra Danilova
- Artur Nishchenkin
- Leonid Parkhomenko
- Ivan Lyubeznov
- Anatoli Papanov
