= Galina Sergeyeva =

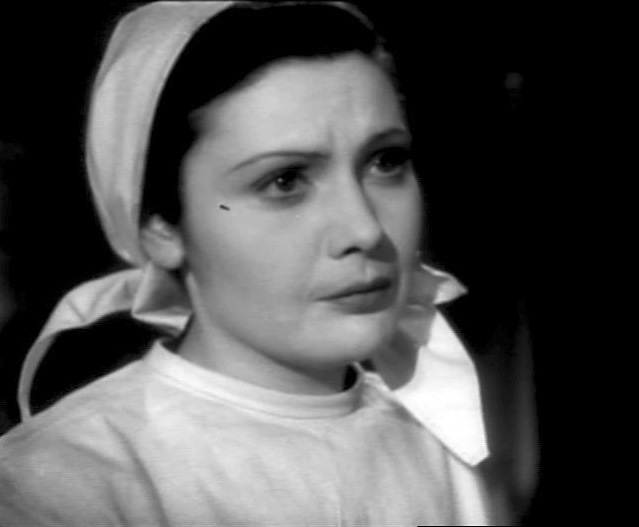
Galina Sergeeva

Galina Yermolaevna Sergeyeva (Russian: Гали́на Ермола́евна Серге́ева; February 1, 1914 – August 1, 2000) was a Soviet and Russian actress. Honored Artist of the RSFSR (1935).

From 1930, she was an actress at the Theatre-Studio led by Ruben Simonov. In 1939-1944 she was an actress of the Theatre of Leninsky Comsomol. In 1952-1956 she worked in the Vakhtangov Theatre in Moscow. She was the second wife of the famous Soviet opera singer Ivan Kozlovsky. They had two daughters.

== Films ==
She played the main roles in the following films:

- "Pyshka" ("Пышка" - "The Puff-Girl", director Mikhail Romm 1934 - the role of Mademoiselle Bousse)
- "Lyubov Alyony" ("Любовь Алены" - "Alyona’s Love", 1934)
- "Vesennie dni" ("Весенние дни" - "The Spring Days", a comedy, 1934)
- "Myach i Serdse" ("Мяч и сердце" - "The Ball and the Heart") 1935
- "Gobsec" (1936)
- "Budni" ("Будни" - "Black-letter Days") - dramatic story, 1940)
- "Aktrisa" ("Актриса" - "Actress", dramatic story, 1943)
