= Yevgeny Gabrilovich =

Russian writer and screenwriter (1899–1993)

- Born: Yevgeny Iosifovich Gabrilovich; 29 September 1899; Voronezh, Russian Empire
- Died: 5 December 1993 (aged 94); Moscow, Russia
- Occupations: Writer, playwright, screenwriter

Yevgeny Iosifovich Gabrilovich (Russian: Евге́ний Ио́сифович Габрило́вич; 29 September 1899 – 5 December 1993) was a Soviet and Russian writer, playwright and screenwriter. He wrote for 29 films between 1936 and 1988.

== Filmography ==
- The Last Night (1936), together with Yuli Raizman
- Mashenka (1942), together with Sergei Yermolinsky
- Dream (1943), together with Mikhail Romm
- Two Soldiers (1943)
- Girl No. 217 (1945), together with Mikhail Romm
- In the Name of Life (1946), together with Iosif Kheifits, Aleksandr Zarkhi and Sergei Yermolinsky
- The Return of Vasili Bortnikov (1953), together with Galina Nikolaeva
- Murder on Dante Street (1956), together with Mikhail Romm
- The Communist (1957)
- Stories About Lenin (1957), together with Mikhail Volpin and Nikolai Erdman
- Resurrection (1960), together with Mikhail Schweitzer
- Lenin in Poland (1966), together with Sergei Yutkevich
- Your Contemporary (1967), together with Yuli Raizman
- Sofiya Perovskaya (1967), together with Lev Arnshtam
- No Path Through Fire (1968), together with Gleb Panfilov
- The Beginning (1970), together with Gleb Panfilov
- Monologue (1972)
- A Strange Woman (1977)
- Late Dates (1980), together with Aleksei Gabrilovich
- Lenin in Paris (1981), together with Sergei Yutkevich

== Awards and honours ==
- Stalin Prize, 2nd class (1943) – for the screenplay to Mashenka (1942)
- Two Orders of the Red Banner of Labour (1944, 1960)
- Order of the Patriotic War, 2nd class (1945)
- Two USSR State Prizes (1967, 1983) – for the screenplays to Lenin in Poland (1966) and Lenin in Paris (1981)
- Two Orders of Lenin (1967, 1979)
- Honoured Worker of the Arts Industry of the RSFSR (1969)
- National Prize of the German Democratic Republic (1971) – for the film On the Road to Lenin (1970)
- Hero of Socialist Labour (1979)
- Order of the Patriotic War, 1st class (1985)
- Nika Award for the Lifetime Achievement Award (1989)
- Order of the October Revolution
- People's Artist of the Latvian SSR
