= Murder on Dante Street =

- Russian: Убийство на улице Данте
- Directed by: Mikhail Romm
- Written by: Yevgeni Gabrilovich; Mikhail Romm
- Produced by: Igor Vakar
- Starring: Yevgeniya Kozyreva; Mikhail Kozakov; Nikolai Komissarov; Maksim Shtraukh; Rostislav Plyatt; Vladimir Muravyov
- Cinematography: Boris Volchek
- Edited by: Eva Ladyzhenskaya
- Music by: Boris Chaikovsky
- Production company: Mosfilm
- Release date: 1956
- Running time: 98 minutes
- Country: Soviet Union
- Language: Russian

Murder on Dante Street (Russian: Убийство на улице Данте, romanized: Ubiystvo na ulitse Dante) is a 1956 Soviet drama film directed by Mikhail Romm.

== Plot ==
Shortly after the end of World War II, in a small French town of Ciboure, a policeman, responding to a report of the sound of gunfire, finds a woman with three gunshot wounds in house 26 on Dante Street. The victim turns out to be the famous actress Madeleine Thibault; in the hospital, she regains consciousness and tells her story to the investigator.

In 1940, as German troops approach Paris, Madeleine Thibault, her manager, Greene, and her son Charles escape to the south, to Ciboure, where her former husband Philip, Charles' father, lives. On the way, they run out of gas. Charles leaves in search of gas and does not return. It later transpires that he is arrested by the swiftly advancing Germans, and three weeks later he is released as a convinced fascist.

When Thibault reaches Ciboure, the Germans are already there. After slapping a German officer, Madeleine is forced to go into hiding in her father Hyppolite's house along with fellow villager Jourdan, who hit a German officer and killed a young Frenchman who joined the ranks of the fascists. Charles comes to visit the house and discovers Jourdan. Later that day the house is raided by German officials. Jourdan is not found, but a shadow of suspicion falls on Charles.

Madeleine agrees to act in a play in front of the Germans, during which her heroine kills her former lover. During the performance, which is attended by Charles, Madeleine shoots and kills the local “Fuhrer” who is in the audience. With the help of a costume designer at the theatre, she and Greene manage to escape; however, a little later, Greene is mortally wounded on the street and tells Madeleine that Charles was among the three who attacked him.

The costume designer's son initiates Madeleine into the Resistance Movement. After the end of the war, she arrives in Ciboure and learns that the Germans hanged Philip before leaving the city: he also participated in the Resistance. Charles arrives with a group of friends and Madeleine recognizes one of the German officers who was looking for Jourdan in their village house. Madeleine accuses Charles of reporting his father. While he assures her that he had no part in his father's arrest and execution, he refuses to go with her to the police. Fearing exposure, he threatens her with a revolver but is unable to kill her. In the conflict, one of his friends shoots her instead.

Charles and his friends are arrested; the investigator, who recorded the testimony of Madeleine Thibault, comes to their cell to release them, revealing that he worked with the Germans during the war and continues to sympathize with them.

Madeleine Thibault dies from her wounds. Ten years pass, Charles arrives in Ciboure, and in the restaurant, he is recognized by the costume designer's son, who knows nothing about his past. His mother's friend Charles reports that Madeleine Thibault's murderers have not yet been found. Then he begins to praise West Germany, to which the dresser's son, realizing who is in front of him, replies: “France is no longer the same. And it's not easy to break. No matter how they marched there”.

== Cast ==
- Yevgeniya Kozyreva as Madeleine Thibault
- Mikhail Kozakov as Charles Thibault, Madeleine's son
- Nikolai Komissarov as Hippolyte, Madeleine's father
- Maksim Shtraukh as Philipp Thibault, Madeleine's husband
- Rostislav Plyatt as Grin, Madeleine's impresario
- Vladimir Muravyov as Jourden
- Georgiy Vitsin as Pitou
- Aleksandr Pelevin as Jacques
- Anatoly Kubatsky as Isidore
- Pavel Shpringfeld as Fiancé
- Elena Ponsova as Madam Coupot
- Leonid Gubanov as Madam Coupot's son
- Gennadi Yudin as actor
- Oleg Golubitsky as Claude Junod
- Valentin Gaft as Marseille Rouger
- Aleksandr Shatov as Detective
- Innokenty Smoktunovsky as a young fascist
