= The Thirteen =

- Directed by: Mikhail Romm
- Written by: Iosif Prut; Mikhail Romm
- Starring: Ivan Novoseltsev; Yelena Kuzmina
- Cinematography: Boris Volchek
- Edited by: Tatyana Likhachyova
- Music by: Anatoli Aleksandrov
- Distributed by: Mosfilm
- Release date: 8 May 1937
- Running time: 1h 30min
- Country: Soviet Union
- Language: Russian

The Thirteen (Note: Russian: Тринадцать, romanized: Trinadtsat') is a 1937 Soviet epic Ostern action adventure film directed by Mikhail Romm. Starring Ivan Novoseltsev and Yelena Kuzmina, it depicts a group of Red Army soldiers and civilians who fight to defend an essential desert well from a group of Basmachi bandits in Central Asia. The film was commissioned by Joseph Stalin as a Soviet adaptation of John Ford's film The Lost Patrol.

== Plot ==
The Thirteen (full film)

In Soviet Central Asia, ten demobilized Red Army soldiers ride through the desert to the railroad. Three more people are with them: commander of the frontier Zhuravlev and his wife Maria Nikolaevna and an old geologist. In the desert, they find a well and hidden machine guns – this is the base of Basmach Shirmat Khan, whom the Red Army could not neutralize for a whole year. A single soldier is sent out for help while others remain to restrain the Basmachi.

There is almost no water in the well, but the soldiers carefully conceal it from the Basmachi who have approached. The bandits suffer from thirst and attack in an attempt to reach the well. In an unequal battle, nearly all the defenders are killed, but their enemies are captured by the cavalry which has come to the rescue.

== Themes and representation ==
The detachment depicted in the film was composed to represent the multiethnic character of the Soviet Union. In addition to its Russian members, it includes soldiers of Turkic Muslim, Georgian and Ukrainian origin. Three members of the unit, Atakuliyev, Muradov and Yusuf Akchurin, are of Turkic Muslim background and are assigned prominent roles in the defence of the well. Atakuliyev is killed while fighting, Muradov is entrusted with crossing the desert to bring reinforcements, and Akchurin assumes command after the death of the detachment’s commander. Akchurin subsequently maintains the defenders’ morale, deceives the Basmachi about the amount of water remaining in the well and continues the resistance until reinforcements arrive. This comparatively prominent representation of Central Asian soldiers did not correspond to their considerably more limited presence in the Red Army during the period in which the story is set. Their inclusion instead allowed the film to present the conflict as a struggle within Central Asian society rather than simply a confrontation between Russians and the local population. Turkic characters serving in the Red Army are portrayed as disciplined and heroic members of the Soviet collective, while the Basmachi are depicted as disorganized, politically illegitimate and hostile to the new Soviet order.

The well functions as the central element around which the film’s political and moral oppositions are organized. The Red Army soldiers are shown attempting to preserve and defend water as a shared and indispensable resource, whereas the Basmachi are associated with filling desert wells with sand and denying water even to other travellers and animals. The weapons discovered beside the well are identified in the film as British-supplied machine guns, while the Basmachi delegation is represented by Lieutenant Colonel Skuratov, a Russian White officer who conducts negotiations on behalf of Shirmat Khan. These details connect the Basmachi not only with disorder and cruelty but also with foreign intervention and the counter-revolutionary forces of the Russian Civil War. Their attacks are presented as uncoordinated mass charges, in contrast to the discipline, division of responsibilities and willingness to sacrifice displayed by the defenders. Produced in 1936, shortly after Soviet authorities considered the Basmachi movement to have been suppressed, the film converted the military conflict in Central Asia into a socialist-realist narrative of border defence. It consequently presented the consolidation of Soviet authority in the region as the victory of an organized, technologically advanced and multiethnic political order over an isolated enemy allegedly dependent on foreign assistance.

== Cast ==
- Ivan Novoseltsev - Squadron Commander Ivan Zhuravlyov
- Yelena Kuzmina - Marya Nikolaevna Zhuravlyova
- Aleksandr Chistyakov - Aleksandr Petrovich Postnikov, geologist
- Andrei Fajt - Sub-Colonel Skuratov
- Ivan Kuznetsov - Soldier Yusuf Akchurin
- Alexei Dolinin as Aleksey Timoshkin - Red Army soldier (as A. Dolinin)
- Pyotr Masokha as Petr Sviridenko - Red Army soldier (as P. Masokha)
- Pavel Yudin as Petrov - Red Army soldier (as P. Yudin)
- Dmitry Zolts] as Dimiriy Levkoyev - Red Army soldier (as D. Zolts)
- Viktor Kulakov as Nikolay Balandin - Red Army soldier (as V. Kulakov)

== Production ==
Stalin, who personally oversaw Soviet cinema, greatly admired John Ford’s 1934 film The Lost Patrol. Although he frequently intervened in the filmmaking process, he was usually guided by broad ideological principles rather than personal preferences. In this instance, Stalin commissioned Boris Shumyatsky, the head of the Main Directorate of the Cinema and Photo Industry, to produce a Soviet version of the film.

The film was shot between February and August 1936 in the Karakum Desert, 15 km from Ashgabat. The only female role was played by Yelena Alexandrovna Kuzmina, who became Mikhail Romm’s wife after working on the film.

Romm’s work can be described as one of the first Soviet "desert films" or Osterns (films depicting the struggle against the Basmachi).

== Influence ==
The 1943 American film Sahara, directed by Zoltan Korda and starring Humphrey Bogart, and its 1995 remake have significant plot similarities. In fact, in the film's opening credits for the screenplay and adaptation, the 1943 film credits the Soviet photoplay for inspiration.
