= Iosif Prut =

Russian playwright and screenwriter (1900–1996)

Iosif Leonidovich Prut (Russian: Прут, Иосиф Леонидович; 6 November 1900 – 16 July 1996) was a Russian playwright and the first Soviet screenwriter. Prut was awarded the title of Honoured Artist of the RSFSR (1983).

== Biography ==
Iosif Prut was born on November 18, 1900, in the city of Taganrog, in the Don Host Oblast of the Russian Empire. In 1901 his immediate family were diagnosed with acute tuberculosis and they travelled to Leysin, Switzerland, for a treatment in a local clinic. His father soon died of complications and was buried in Gerbersdorf, Germany. Iosif stayed in Leysin for treatment until 1908.

After returning several times to Taganrog and studying for a while at a Rostov on Don gymnasium, he moved to Switzerland for permanent residence with his aunt Anne Helghi and entered the École Nouvelle, a private school in Chailly near Lausanne. Among his alumni and close friends were Edward "Donnie" Donegall (1915-1918), a well-known war journalist, Constantine "Costa" Gratsos, vice president of Onassis' Victory Carriers, and Frédéric Siordet, lawyer, author and vice president of the International Red Cross.

In 1918 he graduated from the École Nouvelle and enlisted to the École Polytechnique in Paris, but quit and volunteered to serve in the Russian expeditionary corps. Iosif Prut was decorated with a Transfiguration cross.

After returning to Russia, he participated in the Russian Civil War within the 1st Cavalry Army (Soviet Union) under command of Semyon Budyonny, was in command of a platoon within the 36th regiment of the 6th Cavalry Caucasus division.

Iosif Prut moved to Moscow in 1922.

For the first time Prut wrote for a Red Army gazette in 1919. Most playwrights were dedicated to the Soviet Army and were staged at the Red Army Theater.

Prut worked for the Mezhrabpom-Rus(Межрабпом-Русь) film studio in 1924–1928, and for Lenfilm in 1928–1932.

During the German-Soviet War, he served at a mobile tank-repairing factory, later headed the club of the 222nd Smolensk Red-Banner Rifle Division (222 Смоленская Краснознаменная стрелковая дивизия), participated in several reconnaissance raid in the enemy rear, earning the Soviet Medal for Combat Service.

Iosif Prut died in Brest on July 16, 1996.

== Bibliography (plays) ==
- Маршал удалой: Пьеса. Л., 1932
- Князь Мстислав Удалой: Пьеса. М., 1933
- О.К.Б.: Этапы человеческой жизни. Л.; М., 1934
- Восточный батальон. М., 1935. В соавторстве с братьями Тур
- Я вас люблю: Лирические сцены. М., 1935
- Член Реввоенсовета. М., 1936
- Год девятнадцатый: Пьеса. М., 1937
- Две ночи: Пьеса. М., 1940
- Дорога на юг: Историческая хроника. М., 1940
- Молодая гвардия: Пьеса. М., 1940
- Секретарь райкома: Пьеса. М., 1943
- Судьба Реджинальда Дэвиса: Пьеса. М., 1947. В соавторстве с В.М.Кожевниковым
- Тихий океан: Пьеса. М.; Л., 1949
- Пьесы. М., 1951
- Конек-Горбунок: Пьеса по мотивам одноименной сказки. М., 1959
- Пьесы. М., 1963
- Останемся верны: Пьеса. М., 1970. В соавторстве с Г.Д.Красильниковым
- На новой улице: Пьеса. М., 1973
- Солдаты: Пьеса. М., 1975
- Разгром: Драматическая поэма. М., 1976. В соавторстве с Н.Захаровым
- Ну и ну! или довольно странная история, изложенная в 2-х действиях, 6 карт. М., 1977
- Золотой песок: Пьеса. М., 1979
- Пьесы. М., 1982
- Катрин: Музыкальная комедия по мотивам В.Сарду. М., 1984. В соавторстве с А.Дноховским.

== Filmography ==
=== Screenwriter ===
- 1929 — Сто двадцать тысяч в год — with G. Chernyak
- 1931 — Огонь («Костер с далекой реки»)
- 1931 — Человек из тюрьмы («Человек за решеткой») (1931),
- 1932 — Запах великой империи, with M. Gerasimov
- 1932 — Для вас найдется работа, with Ilya Trauberg
- 1937 — The Thirteen (Тринадцать), with Mikhail Romm
- 1938 — Год девятнадцатый, with Ilya Trauberg
- 1938 — Пограничная застава
- 1939 — Эскадрилья No. 5
- 1940 — My Love (Моя любовь)
- 1942 — Секретарь райкома
- 1942 — Сын бойца (новелла в киноальманахе «Боевой киносборник» No. 12)
- 1943 — Одна семья (фильм на экраны не вышел) — with Lev Vaysenberg and M. Dzhal
- 1948 — Мальчик с окраины, with V. Kozhevnik
- 1950 — В мирные дни
- 1954 — Богатырь» идет в Марто
- 1955 — Случай с ефрейтором Кочетковым
- 1960 — Девичья весна, with M. Dolgopolov and N. Nadezhdina
- 1962 — Здравствуйте, дети!, with I. Donskoy
- 1964 — Ждите нас на рассвете — with Emil Loteanu
- 1965 — Последняя ночь в раю, with G. Malarchuk
- 1966 — Сурайя (also known as «Жизнь прошла ночью»), with U. Nazarov
- 1967 — Чернушка, with S. Makhmudbekov
- 1969 — Взрыв после полуночи, with E. Karamyan
- 1970 — «Совесть заела»
- 1973 — За час до рассвета

== Honours and awards ==
- Honoured Artist of the RSFSR (1983)
- Order of Friendship of Peoples
- Order of the Badge of Honour
- Medal for Combat Service

== External links and references ==
- Iosif Prut at IMDb
- И.Л. Прут, биография
- И.Л. Прут на сайте «Культура России»
