= Roll Call (film) =

- Russian: Перекличка
- Directed by: Daniil Khrabrovitsky
- Written by: Daniil Khrabrovitsky
- Starring: Nikita Mikhalkov; Oleg Strizhenov; Marianna Vertinskaya; Tatyana Doronina; Vasiliy Merkurev
- Cinematography: Yuri Sokol
- Edited by: Aleksandra Borovskaya
- Music by: Moisey Vaynberg
- Release date: 1965
- Country: Soviet Union
- Language: Russian

Roll Call (Russian: Перекличка) is a 1965 Soviet drama film directed by Daniil Khrabrovitsky.

== Plot ==
The film tells about General Zhuravlev, who after the war is engaged in the creation of spaceships. He sets a rocket with astronaut Borodin into the sky and recalls his namesake, whom he met in the war.

== Cast ==
- Nikita Mikhalkov as Sergey Borodin
- Oleg Strizhenov as Aleksey Borodin kozmonavt
- Marianna Vertinskaya as Katya
- Tatyana Doronina as Nika
- Vasiliy Merkurev as Viktor Ilyich Zhuravlyov
- Yevgeny Steblov as Sasha Amelchenko
- Shavkat Gaziyev as Mekhanik-voditel tankovogo ekipazha
- Leonid Obolensky
- Vsevolod Sanaev as Varentsev
- Yevgeny Vesnik as Vasya
