= Maya Turovskaya =

- Turovskaya in 2007
- Born: Maya Iosifovna Turovskaya; 27 October 1924; Kharkov, Ukrainian Soviet Socialist Republic, USSR
- Died: 4 March 2019 (aged 94); Munich, Germany
- Occupations: Theatre and film critic, writer
- Years active: 1948–2019
- Awards: Nika Award (2007)

Maya Iosifovna Turovskaya (Russian: Майя Иосифовна Туровская; 27 October 1924 – 4 March 2019) was a Soviet and Russian theatrical and film critic, film historian, screenwriter, and culturologist. She was awarded the Nika Award in 2007 for her contribution to cinematographic sciences and criticism.

== Biography ==
Maya Turovskaya was born in Kharkov in 1924. In 1947 she graduated from the philological faculty of Moscow State University, and in 1948 she studied at the theater department of GITIS, where she was a student of Abram Efros.

She became a member of the Union of Soviet Writers in 1960, and a member of the USSR Union of Cinematographers in 1966. In 1969, she was employed as a research associate at the Institute of World Economy and International Relations in Moscow. From 1973 to 2019, she worked as a leading researcher at the Institute of Theory, History of Cinema.

She was published in Theater, Soviet Screen, The Art of Cinema, Kinovedcheskie Zapiski, Moscow Observer and other publications. She wrote the retrospective of the Cinema of the Totalitarian Epoch at the International Film Festival in Moscow in 1989. She authored a number of documentaries, including Mikhail Romm's Triumph Over Violence (co-authored with Romm and Khanyutin), and numerous monographs devoted to theater and cinema. She completed her doctorate in Art History in 1983.

From 1992 until her death she lived in Munich. She died on 4 March 2019 at age 94.
