= Secret Mission (1950 film) =

- Russian: Секретная миссия
- Directed by: Mikhail Romm
- Written by: Konstantin Isaev; Mikhail Maklyarsky
- Starring: Lyudmila Skopina; Pavel Kadochnikov; Vladimir Druzhnikov; Boris Sitko; Vsevolod Aksyonov
- Cinematography: Boris Volchek
- Edited by: Yeva Ladyzhenskaya
- Music by: Aram Khachaturian
- Release date: 1950
- Country: Soviet Union
- Language: Russian

Secret Mission (Russian: Секретная миссия) is a 1950 Soviet war drama film directed by Mikhail Romm.

== Plot ==
The film tells about the Soviet scout Marta Shirka, which the fascists expose.

== Starring ==
- Nikolai Komissarov as Senator Allan
- Sergei Vecheslov as Gawrey
- Yelena Kuzmina as Marta Shirke
- Aleksey Gribov as Pyotr Vasilievich, Soviet intelligence General
- Aleksandr Cheban as General
- Aleksandr Antonov as General Schitte
- Vladimir Belokurov as Martin Bormann
- Pyotr Berezov as Heinrich Himmler (as Pavel Beryozov)
- Pavel Gaideburov as Rogers
- Vladimir Gardin as Dillon
- Aleksandr Khokhlov as Gustav Krupp
- Vasili Makarov as Dementiev
- Aleksandr Pelevin as Walter Schellenberg
- Mark Pertsovskiy as Ernst Kaltenbrunner
- Nikolai Rybnikov as Vanderkorn
- Vladimir Savelev as Adolf Hitler
- Nikolay Trofimov
- Mikhail Vysotsky as Winston Churchill
- Vladimir Gotovtsev as German Industrialist
