= The Conveyor of Death =

1933 film

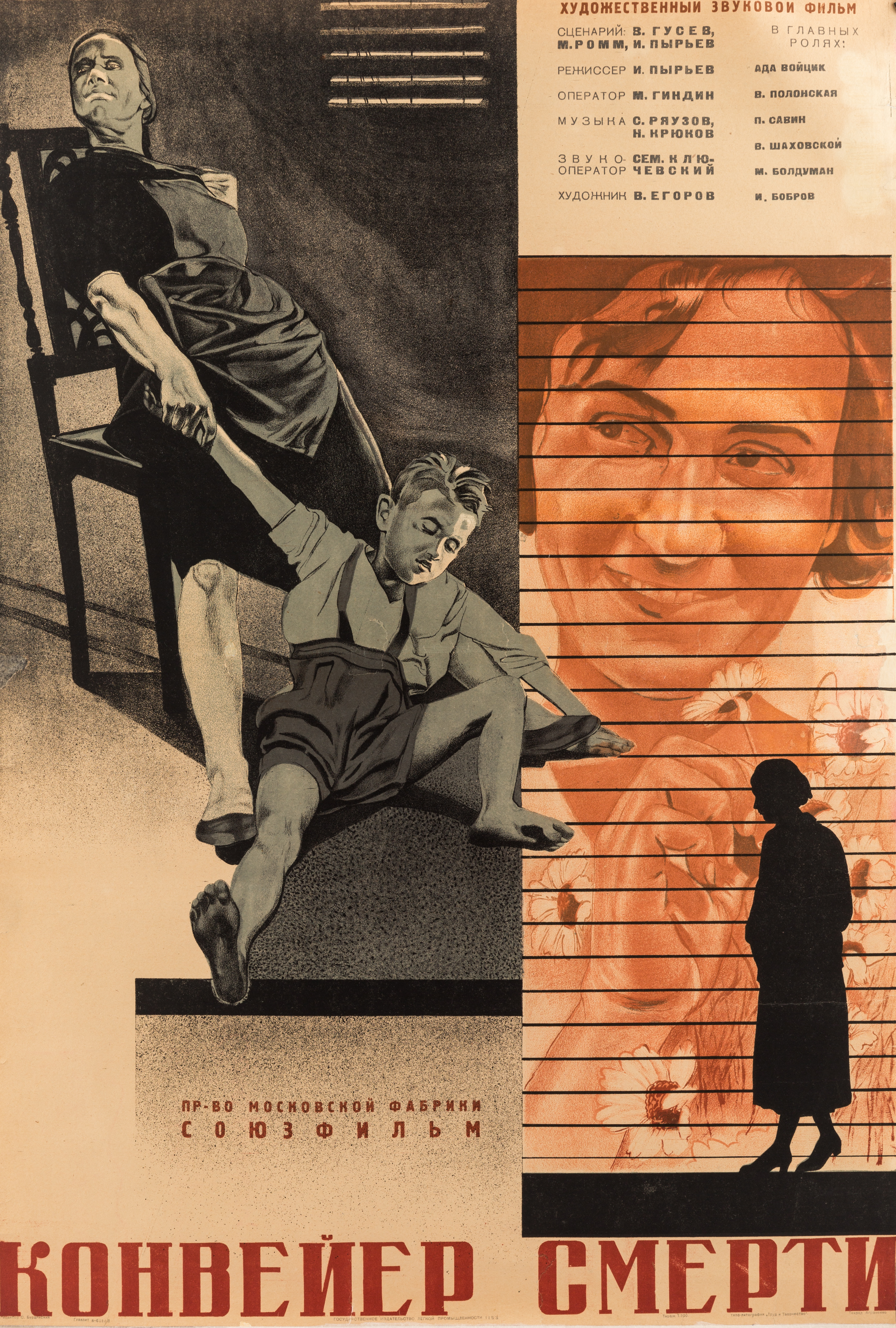
- Russian: Конвейер смерти
- Directed by: Ivan Pyryev
- Written by: Viktor Gusev; Ivan Pyrev; Mikhail Romm
- Starring: Mikhail Astangov; Mikhail Bolduman; Veronika Polonskaya; Maksim Shtraukh; Ada Vojtsik
- Cinematography: Mikhail Gindin
- Music by: Nikolai Kryukov; Sergei Ryauzov
- Release date: 1933
- Country: Soviet Union
- Language: Russian

The Conveyor of Death (Russian: Конвейер смерти) is a 1933 Soviet film directed by Ivan Pyryev.

== Plot ==
Set in the early 1930s in a fictional capitalist country, the film follows three young women—Louise, Ellie, and Anni—who are thrown out of work by a devastating economic crisis. Their dreams of a better life collapse: Louise hopes to marry her fiancé, Dick, a young worker and Komsomol member, but finds herself humiliated at the labor exchange and ultimately takes a job at a weapons factory. Spoiled and shallow, Ellie spirals into despair and resorts to prostitution in her pursuit of an easy life—her degrading encounter with the repulsive Prince Sumbatov becomes a stark symbol of her downfall. Only Anni, a committed communist, endures hardship with dignity, dedicating herself to the revolutionary cause as part of the "Red Front".

Meanwhile, unrest brews at the local arms factory, where workers are being recruited to fulfill a large order for weapons destined for imperialist wars in China and South America. Dick, alongside his comrade Kurt and other communists, urges the workers to reject participating in what they call the "conveyor of death". But hunger and desperation push many to accept the work—Louise among the first. A clandestine resistance begins. Dick is arrested while distributing anti-war leaflets, but he escapes. The workers rise up against the police and emerge victorious. A strike breaks out at the factory, and for the first time, even those who once stood aside from the class struggle—like Louise—join the fight.

== Background ==
The original screenplay by Mikhail Romm was titled "Commodity of the Squares" and under this name, the film went into production in 1932. The original plot focused on the fate of three young women during the global economic downturn in Germany (the Weimar Republic). The film was completed by the end of 1932 but was shelved by film officials, who deemed it too long, unclear, and lacking a strong depiction of the fight against fascism. While revisions were underway, the Nazis came to power in Germany, prompting the removal of all references to the country in the film's setting. The film premiered on November 7, 1933, but failed to win over audiences.

== Cast ==
- Ada Vojtsik as Luisa
- Veronika Polonskaya as Eleonora
- Tamara Makarova as Anni
- Vladimir Shakhovskoy as Dick
- Pyotr Savin as Kristi - postman
- Vladimir Chernyavsky as Avgust Kroon
- Ivan Bobrov as Max
- Mikhail Bolduman as Kurt
- Mikhail Astangov as Prince Sumbatov
- Aleksandr Chistyakov as Kashevskiy - master
