= O Gênio do Crime =

O Gênio do Crime (The Genius of Crime) is a 1969 novel, the first book by Brazilian author João Carlos Marinho. It remains a publishing success, with more than 1 million copies sold in 62 editions, and is cited as one of the great novels of Brazilian children's literature. It is a severe social critique of Brazilian society.

In 2006 it was published in Spanish under the title El Crimen del Genius. It was adapted for film twice: in 1973 by Tito Teijido, entitled O Detetive Bolacha contra o Gênio do Crime, and in 2026, by Lipe Binder, under the original title O Gênio do Crime.
