= École nouvelle de la Suisse romande =

International school in Lausanne, Switzerland

Coordinates: 46.5268283°N 6.6527254°E

New School of the French-speaking Switzerland
- French: École nouvelle de la Suisse romande

Information
- School type: Boarding school
- Established: 1906; 119 years ago
- Gender: Mixed
- Age: 3 to 18
- Enrollment: c. 600
- Language: French and English

École Nouvelle de la Suisse Romande (English: New School of the French-speaking Switzerland) or ENSR International School is a private, co-educational boarding school, founded in 1906 and located in Lausanne, Switzerland. It has approximately 600 students and boarding facilities for students aged 12 and above. It is a secular school with educational programmes from kindergarten to the final year of high school offering a programme in French with English or a programme in English with French. Students have the choice of two diplomas: The International Baccalaureate or the Swiss Maturity.

== History ==
ENSR International School was founded in 1906 at Chailly, Lausanne, by Edouard Vittoz. It was originally founded as part of the New Education movement at the beginning of the 20th century – a movement which promoted the creation of boarding schools in countryside settings, with modern pedagogy focused on balanced, holistic child development.

ENSR opened its doors with an enrolment of 36 students in 1906. From its very beginnings, it was notable for being a mixed-gender school. Its first campus was located inside three apartments of the Maurer building. In 1909, the school, located between Chailly and la Fauvette, quickly grew in size. The present campus was constructed between 1908 and 1909 and was officially inaugurated on 30 October 1909.

The first Alumni society of ENSR was created in 1909, and became known as the ENSR Alumni Association several decades later.

== External Accreditation ==
ENSR International School is accredited by the International Baccalaureate Organisation (since 1971, the first school in the world to receive such accreditation).

The School is a member of AVDEP, FSEP, Swiss Label, NFI and of SEBIQ.

ENSR International School is fully accredited by Cambridge English as a preparation centre and several of its English teachers are certified Cambridge English teachers.

ENSR enjoys partnerships with other international schools, such as Schulle Schloss Salem in Germany.

Through the Alumni Association and the Neotema Foundation, ENSR also maintains strong links with Thailand. Students and teachers have the opportunity each year to visit Wang Klaikangwon School in Huahin, Thailand, where they are able to take part in a cultural exchange with Thai teachers and students.

A partnership with the Languages Department of the University of Geneva and the Distance Learning Foundation allows Thai teachers and members of the Ministry of Education to visit ENSR annually for two weeks of seminars and exchanges.

== Location ==
ENSR International School is located in the Chailly district of Lausanne, in the north-east of the city. The campus is conveniently located near the city centre (several minutes away by bus) but within proximity to parks and forests.

== Boarding ==
ENSR International School's co-ed boarding facilities are located on the 2.6 hectare school campus and has the capacity to accommodate up to 80 students aged 12 – 18 years.

== Alumni Association ==
ENSR's Alumni Association, the Association des Anciens élèves de l’Ecole Nouvelle plays an important role in school life. The Association is very active in the organisation of activities, including the Ski Camp, the Grand Jeu games, breakfasts, and other events. Alumni, who are located all across the world, are able to maintain contact with current students and their parents. The Association, in association with the Distance Learning Foundation, has special links with Thailand for the promotion of the French language.

== Notable alumni ==
- Ananda Mahidol (Rama VIII) (1925—1946)
- Bhumibol Adulyadej (Rama IX) (1927–2016), King of Thailand
- Géraldine Chaplin (born 1944), actress
- Jacques Piccard (1922 - 2008), Swiss oceanographer
- Fernand Auberjonois (1910–2004), journalist and foreign correspondent
- Edward Chichester, 6th Marquess of Donegall (1903–1975), British peer and journalist
- Rodrigo Hernán Lloreda Caicedo (1942—2000), Colombian lawyer and politician
- João Carlos Marinho (born 1935), Brazilian author
- Iosif Prut (1900–1996), Russian playwright
- Kurt Martin (1899-1975), art historian
- Christophe Gallaz
- Robert Piguet (1898 - 1953), fashion designer
- Patrick Nordmann
- Antoine Rebstein
- Marc Rochat (Alpine skier)
- Philippe Amon (Director General of SICPA, Forum of the 100)
- Stefan Catsicas (Forum of the 100)
- Jean-Philippe Rochat
