= Dream (1943 film) =

- Directed by: Mikhail Romm
- Written by: Yevgeny Gabrilovich; Mikhail Romm
- Starring: Yelena Kuzmina; Vladimir Solovyov
- Cinematography: Boris Volchek
- Music by: Henryk Wars
- Release date: 13 September 1943
- Running time: 1h 40min
- Country: Soviet Union
- Language: Russian

Dream (Russian: Мечта, romanized: Mechta) is a 1943 Soviet drama film directed by Mikhail Romm.

== Plot ==
Dream (full film)

The film is set in 1933.

From poor villages in Western Ukraine, at that time belonging to Poland, thousands of people are going to cities in search of work and happiness. Among them is Anna. After working all night as a janitor at a local restaurant, in the morning she returns to her duties as a servant in a rooming house proudly named as "Dream". All inhabitants of the guest house are people broken by life, vainly trying to straighten up, but despite all efforts, somehow tolerate defeat in the battle against the ruthless world. And at the head of this ship which is about to go down, stands Madame Skorohod, who is convinced that she really made it. Paradoxically her compassion mixes with fierce ruthlessness to those below her social status, all-consuming greed and the similarly boundless love for her loser son, for whom she has lived, worked, committed vile acts, while knowing in her heart the futility of these efforts.

== Cast ==
- Yelena Kuzmina - Anna
- Vladimir Solovyov - Vasil, Anna's brother
- Vladimir Shcheglov - Tomash, worker
- Faina Ranevskaya - Madame Rosa Skorohod
- Arkadi Kislyakov - Lazar Skorohod
- Ada Vojtsik - Vanda
- Mikhail Astangov - Stanislav Komorovsky
- Mikhail Bolduman - Zygmunt Dombek
- Rostislav Plyatt - Yanek, cabdriver
- Nikolay Orlov - Old weaver
- Pyotr Glebov
