= Princess Mary (film) =

- Russian: Княжна Мери
- Directed by: Isidor Annensky
- Written by: Isidor Annensky; Arkady Gajdar; Mikhail Lermontov (novel)
- Starring: Anatoliy Verbitskiy; K. Sanova; Karina Shmarinova; Leonid Gubanov; Mikhail Astangov; Klavdiya Yelanskaya
- Cinematography: Mikhail Kirillov
- Music by: Lev Shvarts
- Release date: 1955
- Country: Soviet Union

Princess Mary (Russian: Княжна Мери) is a 1955 Soviet historical romance film directed by Isidor Annensky. It is based on the novel A Hero of Our Time by Mikhail Lermontov.

== Plot ==
Pechorin learns that his friend Grushnitsky is in love with Princess Mary Ligovskaya and he attracts her attention.

== Cast ==
- Anatoliy Verbitskiy as Pechorin (as A. Verbitskiy)
- K. Sanova as princess Mary
- Karina Shmarinova
- Leonid Gubanov as Grushnitskiy (as L. Gubanov)
- Mikhail Astangov as Verner (as M. Astangov)
- Klavdiya Yelanskaya as Ligovskaya (as K. Yelanskaya)
- Tatyana Piletskaya as Vera (as T. Pileskaya)
- Vitali Politseymako as Dragunskiy kapitan (as V. Politseymako)
- Fyodor Nikitin as husband of Vera
- Arutyun Akopyan as Alfelbaum (as A. Akopyan)
- Georgiy Georgiu as Rayevich (as G. Georgiu)
- Dmitriy Kara-Dmitriev as servant
- Viktor Koltsov as
- Konstantin Nemolyayev as officer
- Tatyana Pankova
- Konstantin Mikhaylov
