= Spy of Napoleon =

1936 film

- Directed by: Maurice Elvey
- Written by: Fred V. Merrick; L. du Garde Peach; Harold Simpson
- Based on: A Spy of Napoleon by Emmuska Orczy
- Produced by: Julius Hagen
- Starring: Richard Barthelmess; Dolly Haas; Frank Vosper; Francis L. Sullivan
- Cinematography: Curt Courant
- Edited by: Jack Harris
- Music by: William Trytel
- Production company: Julius Hagen Productions
- Distributed by: Twickenham Film Distributors; Grand National Pictures
- Release date: 9 September 1936
- Running time: 101 minutes
- Country: United Kingdom
- Language: English

Spy of Napoleon is a 1936 British historical drama film directed by Maurice Elvey and starring Richard Barthelmess, Dolly Haas, Frank Vosper, Henry Oscar and James Carew. It is based on the 1934 novel A Spy of Napoleon by Baroness Emmuska Orczy, best known for writing The Scarlet Pimpernel. It was shot at Twickenham Studios in London and on location around Loch Lomond. The film's sets were designed by the art director Andrew Mazzei.

== Plot ==
An illegitimate daughter of Louis Napoleon is taken on as an agent by Napoleon III, ruler of France, who wishes her to spy on the aristocracy whom he suspects of wanting to overthrow him.

== Cast ==
- Richard Barthelmess as Gerard de Lanoy
- Dolly Haas as Eloise
- Frank Vosper as Napoleon III
- Francis L. Sullivan as Chief of Police
- Joyce Bland as Empress Eugenie
- C. Denier Warren as Benicolet
- Henry Oscar as Hugo Blot
- Marjorie Mars as Anna
- Brian Buschell as Phillippe St. Paul
- Lyn Harding as Bismarck
- Wilfrid Caithness as Von Moltke
- George Merritt as Prussian Consul
- Stafford Hillard as Newspaper seller
- James Carew as Gatling
