= Daniil Khrabrovitsky =

Soviet screenwriter and filmmaker

- Даниил Храбровицкий
- Born: 28 June 1923; Rostov-on-Don, Soviet Union
- Died: 1 March 1980 (aged 56); Moscow, Soviet Union

Daniil Yakovlevich Khrabrovitsky (Russian: Даниил Яковлевич Храбровицкий; 28 June 1923 – 1 March 1980) was a Soviet screenwriter and film director.

== Filmography ==
- 1959: Everything Begins from the Road (Все начинается с дороги)
- 1959: To Believe in the Fixed (Исправленному верить)
- 1961: Nine Days in One Year (Девять дней одного года)
- 1961: Clear Skies (Чистое небо)
- 1965: Roll Call (Перекличка)
- 1969: Of The Mail (Почтовый)
- 1972: Taming of the Fire (Укрощение огня)
- 1975: Tale of the Human Heart (Повесть о человеческом сердце)
- 1979: Poem about Wings (Поэма о крыльях)
