= A Spy of Napoleon =

1934 novel

First edition (publ. Hodder & Stoughton)

A Spy of Napoleon is a 1934 historical novel by the British writer Baroness Emmuska Orczy. An illegitimate daughter of Louis Napoleon is taken on as an agent by Napoleon III, ruler of France, who wishes her to marry into and spy on the aristocracy who he suspects of wanting to overthrow him. Her lover, meanwhile, is sent to Switzerland to infiltrate revolutionaries there.

== Adaptation ==
In 1936 it was made into a film Spy of Napoleon starring Richard Barthelmess, Dolly Haas and James Carew.
