= Boule de Suif =

Short story by Guy de Maupassant

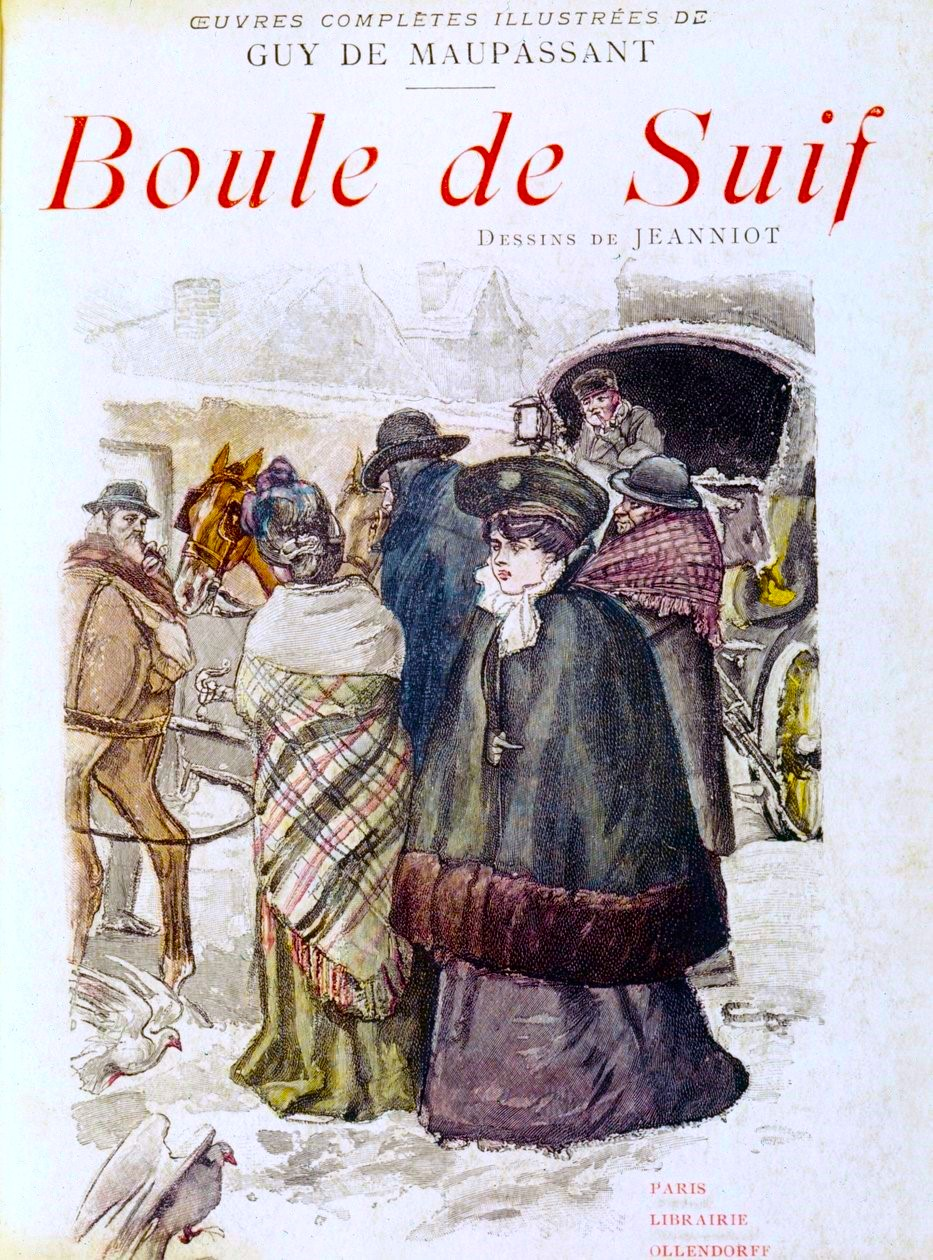
Cover of an edition of "Boule de Suif"

"Boule de Suif" (French pronunciation: [bul də sɥif]), translated variously as "Dumpling", "Butterball", "Ball of Fat", "Ball of Lard", or "Small Ball", is a short story by the late-19th-century French writer Guy de Maupassant, first published on 15/16 April 1880. It is arguably his most famous short story and is the title story for his collection on the Franco-Prussian War, titled Boule de Suif et Autres Contes de la Guerre (Dumpling and Other Stories of the War).

== Plot ==
The story follows a group of French residents of Rouen, recently occupied by the Prussian Army. The ten travellers decide for various reasons to leave Rouen and flee to Le Havre in a stagecoach. Sharing the carriage are Boule de Suif or "Butterball" (lit. suet dumpling, also translated as ball of fat), a prostitute whose real name is Elisabeth Rousset; the strict Democrat Cornudet; a shop-owning couple from the petty bourgeoisie, M. and Mme. Loiseau; a wealthy upper-bourgeoisie factory-owner and his wife, M. and Mme. Carré-Lamadon; the Comte and Comtesse of Bréville; and two nuns. Thus, the carriage constitutes a microcosm of French society, representing different parts of the French population during the late 19th century.

Due to the terrible weather, the coach moves very slowly and by midday has only covered a few miles. The occupants initially snub Boule de Suif, but their attitudes change when she produces a picnic basket full of lovely food and offers to share its contents with the hungry travellers.

At the village of Tôtes, the carriage stops at the local coaching inn, and the occupants, hearing a German voice, realise they have blundered into Prussian-held territory. A Prussian officer detains the party at the inn indefinitely without telling them why. Over the next two days, the travellers become increasingly impatient, and are finally told by Boule de Suif that they are being detained until she agrees to have sex with the officer. She is repeatedly called before the officer, and always returns in a heightened state of agitation. Initially, the travellers support her and are furious at the officer's arrogance, but their indignation soon disappears as they grow angry at Boule de Suif for not submitting to the officer so that they can leave. Over the course of the next two days, the travelers use various examples of logic and morality to convince her it is the right thing to do; she finally gives in to the officer's demands, and he allows them to leave the next morning.

As they continue on their way to Le Havre, these "representatives of Virtue" ignore Boule de Suif and turn to polite topics of conversation, glancing scathingly at the young woman while refusing to even acknowledge her, and refusing to share their food with her the way that she did with them earlier. As the coach travels on into the night, Cornudet starts whistling the Marseillaise which sours the mood of everyone in the coach, and all the while Boule de Suif, bemoaning her lost dignity, can hardly suppress her sobs.

== Publication history ==
It was first published in 1880 in Les Soirées de Médan, a collection of Naturalist short stories dealing with the Franco-Prussian war.

== Adaptations ==
The plot has often been adapted, in whole or in part, for films and other media:

- In 1928, a silent film version was The Woman Disputed by Henry King and Sam Taylor.
- In 1932, Shanghai Express by Josef von Sternberg, starring Marlene Dietrich, was loosely based on the story, with significant changes.
- In 1934, the Moscow Art Players, under the auspices of the Soviet studio Mosfilm, produced a silent film version of "Boule de Suif" called Pyshka (Dumpling). It was adapted and directed by Mikhail Romm and starred Galina Sergeyеva. The film was re-released by Mosfilm in 1955 with a narration and sound effects added to it, but remained unknown outside of Russia until its belated premiere in New York in 1958. New York Times reviewer Howard Thompson describes the film as "little more than a musty curio" but with a storyline that "is still pretty wonderful as a yarn and a scathing commentary on hypocrisy and selfishness"
- In 1935, Kenji Mizoguchi made Maria no Oyuki (Oyuki the Virgin).
- Of his 1939 film Stagecoach, John Ford said it was "really 'Boule de Suif'" and McBride attributes the "film's sharp social criticism" to its being "more deeply influence[d] by Maupassant" than by Ernest Haycox's 1937 short story "The Stage to Lordsburg" that established the framework of the film itself.
- In 1940, Irish playwright Lennox Robinson adapted the story for the stage under the name Roly Poly. The production premiered at the Gate Theatre in November 1940. The production was directed by Hilton Edwards.
- In 1943, a remake of Shanghai Express by Ralph Murphy was called Night Plane from Chungking.
- In 1944, Hollywood director Robert Wise undertook a project for RKO Radio Pictures titled Mademoiselle Fifi, based on two of Maupassant's short stories, "Boule de Suif" and the 1882 "Mademoiselle Fifi". This version starred Simone Simon as Elizabeth Bousset, who is the "little laundress" of the short story "Mademoiselle Fifi" rather than the prostitute of "Boule de Suif", and the dandified and lecherous lieutenant is played by Kurt Kreuger.
- In 1944, the Mexican film The Escape directed by Norman Foster was set during the French Intervention in Mexico.
- In 1945, a French film version was released as Boule de Suif, released in the US in 1947 as Angel and Sinner. This film directed by Christian-Jaque, based on a screenplay by Henri Jeanson and starring Micheline Presle and Louis Salou, also imported much of the character of the lecherous Prussian soldier from the Maupassant story "Mademoiselle Fifi".
- In 1951, Peking Express by William Dieterle was an American remake of Night Plane from Chungking.
- The 1959 episode, "Lady on the Stagecoach" from the American television series Have Gun Will Travel, with Richard Boone as Paladin, was based on "Boule de Suif". The half-hour episode transposed the scene from France to the Western US in 1868. In this version, the young woman was the daughter of an Apache chief. Her suitor was the leader of an outlaw gang. The outlaw is foiled in his attempt to abduct the woman by Paladin. In an added twist, the young woman forgives the outlaw leader for trying to abduct her and tells Paladin to let him go, because, she says, "He said he had respect for me."
- In 1959, Anatole Litvak's The Journey with Deborah Kerr and Yul Brynner borrowed heavily from the plot device of a group of travellers detained by an authoritarian foreign officer with a romantic interest in an attractive passenger.
- In July 2006, the opera The Greater Good, or The Passion of Boule de Suif opened as a part of the Glimmerglass Opera Festival in Cooperstown, New York. The opera was composed by Stephen Hartke based on a libretto by Phillip Littell and directed by David Schweizer.
- In 2007, Dr. Kausar Mahmood translated "Boule de Suif" and many other stories into the Urdu language under the title of Momi Gainde. It was published by Takhleeqat, Mozang Road, Lahore.
- In 2009, it was adapted and drawn by Li-An as a French-language graphic novel and released by Delcourt Press. In an interview, Li-An noted that one reason "Boule de Suif" was chosen for the Delcourt "Ex Libris" collection was that it had been "more or less at the base of John Ford's Stagecoach" and that the original short story offered a timeless message about human nature and how the "value of a person does not depend on social status" but rather on one's own personality.
