= Last of the Comanches =

1953 film by Andre de Toth

- Theatrical release poster
- Directed by: Andre de Toth
- Written by: Kenneth Gamet
- Produced by: Buddy Adler
- Starring: Broderick Crawford; Barbara Hale; Johnny Stewart; Lloyd Bridges
- Cinematography: Ray Cory; Charles Lawton Jr.
- Edited by: Al Clark
- Music by: George Duning
- Color process: Technicolor
- Production company: Columbia Pictures
- Distributed by: Columbia Pictures
- Release dates: January 28, 1953 (Los Angeles); February 1, 1953 (United States)
- Running time: 85 minutes
- Country: United States
- Language: English

Last of the Comanches is a 1953 American Western film directed by Andre de Toth and starring Broderick Crawford, Barbara Hale, Johnny Stewart and Lloyd Bridges. The film is a remake of the 1943 World War II film Sahara, starring Humphrey Bogart. Lloyd Bridges appeared in both films.

== Plot ==
In 1876 all the Indians are at peace except the Comanches led by Black Cloud. When he wipes out a complete town, leaving only burnt-out ruins, just six soldiers are left and they retreat into the desert, hoping to reach the safety of Fort Macklin. But, it is, at least, 100 miles (160.9 km) away and they are short of water. They are reinforced by members of a stagecoach and find limited water at a deserted mission. Pinned down by Black Cloud they send an Indian boy who was a prisoner on to the fort for reinforcements, while they fight off Black Cloud. He is also suffering from lack of water and they try to delay him with (bogus) offers of water until the cavalry can arrive to rescue them. The stagecoach is carrying a consignment of dynamite and this is used to lay a trap for the marauding Indians – a truly spectacular explosion ensues...

== Cast ==
- Broderick Crawford as Sgt. Maj. Matt Trainor
- Barbara Hale as Julia Lanning
- Johnny Stewart as Little Knife
- Steve Forrest as Lt. Floyd
- Lloyd Bridges as Jim Starbuck
- Mickey Shaughnessy as Pvt. Rusty Potter
- George Mathews as Romany O'Rattigan
- Hugh Sanders as Denver Kinnaird
- Chubby Johnson as Henry Ruppert
- Martin Milner as Pvt. Billy Creel
- Milton Parsons as Satterlee the Prophet
- Carleton Young as Major Lanning
- Jack Woody as Cpl. Floyd
- Ric Roman as Pvt. Martinez
- John War Eagle as Black Cloud

== Comic book adaption ==
- Avon Periodicals: Last of the Comanches (1953)
