= João Carlos Marinho =

Brazilian writer and lawyer (1935–2019)

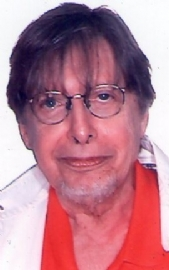
João Marinho

João Carlos Marinho Homem de Mello (25 September 1935 – 17 March 2019) was a Brazilian writer and former lawyer. He was best known by the pen names João Carlos Marinho and João Carlos Marinho Silva. He authored, among other books, O Gênio do Crime, his first novel published in 1969. His work, mainly juvenile thrillers, is considered a landmark in the renewal of the Brazilian children's literature in the 1970s. He wrote 18 titles, 13 of them dedicated to the adventures of the Turma do Gordo.

== Early life ==
Born in Rio de Janeiro, he spent his childhood and adolescence in Santos and São Paulo, before going to study at the École nouvelle de la Suisse romande in Lausanne, Switzerland, where he remained until 20 years of age. He graduated in Law from University of São Paulo and was a lawyer in Guarulhos for nearly 30 years. After retiring as a lawyer, he moved to the neighborhood of Pinheiros, in São Paulo, the scene of many of his narratives.

Marinho died on 17 March 2019, in São Paulo.

== Works ==
=== Adventures of Turma do Gordo ===
- O Gênio do Crime, 1969
- O Caneco de Prata, 1971
- Sangue Fresco, 1982
- O Livro da Berenice, 1984
- Berenice Detetive, 1987
- Berenice Contra o Maníaco Janeloso, 1990
- Cascata de Cuspe - Game Over para o Gordo, 1992
- O Conde Futreson, 1994
- O Disco I: A Viagem, 1996
- O Disco II: A Catástrofe do Planeta Ebulidor, 1998
- O Gordo Contra os Pedófilos, 2001
- Assassinato na Literatura Infantil, 2005
- O Fantasma da Alameda Santos, 2015

=== Others ===
- Professor Albuquerque e a Vida Eterna, 1973 (romance)
- Pedro Soldador, 1976 (romance)
- Conversando de Monteiro Lobato, 1978 (essay)
- Pai Mental e Outras Hístórias, 1983 (short stories)
- Anjo de Camisola, 1988 (poetry)
- O Dueto de Gatos (e Outros Duetos), 2012 (short stories)
