= The Lost Patrol (1934 film) =

1934 film by John Ford

- Original theatrical poster
- Directed by: John Ford
- Screenplay by: Garrett Fort; Dudley Nichols
- Based on: Patrol; 1927 novel by Philip MacDonald
- Produced by: Merian C. Cooper; Cliff Reid; John Ford
- Starring: Victor McLaglen; Boris Karloff; Wallace Ford; Reginald Denny
- Cinematography: Harold Wenstrom
- Edited by: Paul Weatherwax
- Music by: Max Steiner
- Distributed by: RKO Radio Pictures
- Release date: February 16, 1934
- Running time: 73 minutes
- Country: United States
- Language: English
- Budget: $262,000
- Box office: $583,000

The Lost Patrol is a 1934 American pre-Code war film by RKO, directed and produced by John Ford, with Merian C. Cooper as executive producer and Cliff Reid as associate producer from a screenplay by Dudley Nichols from the 1927 novel Patrol by Philip MacDonald. Max Steiner provided the Oscar-nominated score. The film, a remake of a 1929 British silent film, starred Victor McLaglen, Boris Karloff, Wallace Ford, Reginald Denny, J. M. Kerrigan and Alan Hale. (Note: The Lost Patrol (1929) coincidentally starred Victor McLaglen's younger brother Cyril McLaglen in the lead role.)

MacDonald's story, and the 1936 Soviet film The Thirteen (set in the Central Asia desert during the Basmachi rebellion and directed by Mikhail Romm), inspired the 1943 film Sahara, featuring Humphrey Bogart.

== Plot ==
During World War I, the young lieutenant in charge of a small British mounted patrol in the empty Mesopotamian desert is shot and killed by an unseen sniper. This leaves the sergeant at a loss, since he had not been told what their mission is and has no idea where they are. Riding north in the hope of rejoining their brigade, the eleven remaining men reach a deserted oasis where they find water, edible dates, and shelter.

During the night, one of the sentries is killed, the other seriously wounded, and all their horses are stolen, leaving them stranded. They bury the dead man and put his sword at the head of his grave. One by one, the remaining men are picked off by the unseen assailants. During the course of the film, the men talk and reminisce and fight—and deal with their situation. In desperation, the sergeant sends two men chosen by lot on foot for help, but they are caught and their mutilated bodies returned. One man, Abelson, suffering from heat exhaustion, sees a mirage and wanders into deadly rifle fire. The pilot of a British biplane spots the survivors, but nonchalantly lands nearby and despite frantic warnings is killed. After dark, the sergeant takes the machine gun from the aircraft and then sets the plane on fire as a signal to any British troops. Sanders, a religious fanatic, goes mad and walks into deadly fire. Pvt. Morelli tries to save him but fails, as he runs back to the Sergeant, he too is gunned down.

In the end only the sergeant is left and, thinking he too is dead, the six Arabs who have been besieging the oasis advance on foot. Using the machine gun from the aircraft, the sergeant kills them all. A British patrol which had seen the smoke from the burning plane rides up and the officer in charge asks the sergeant roughly where his men are. In silence, the sergeant looks toward their graves, six swords gleaming in the sun.

== Cast ==
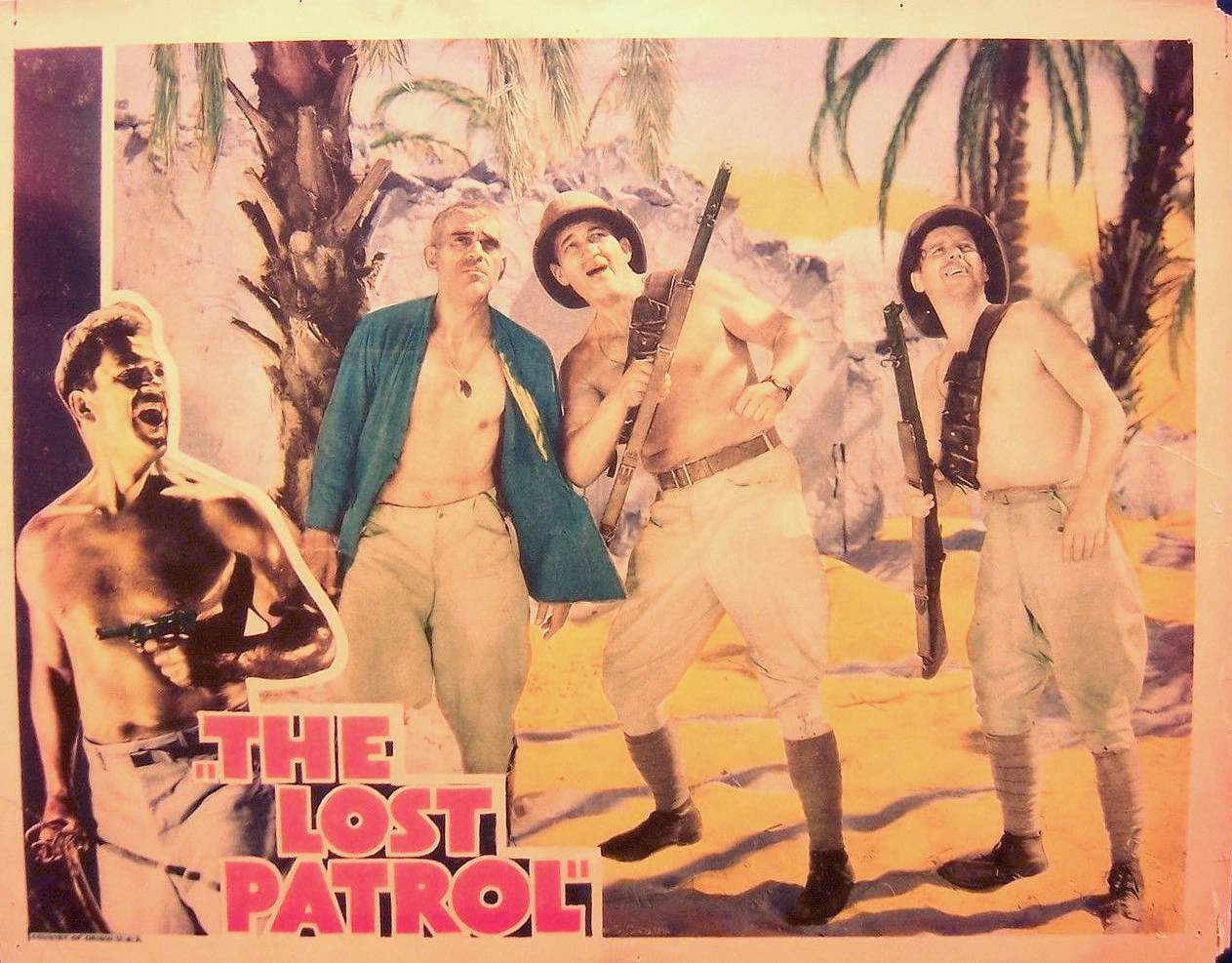
Lobby card

- Victor McLaglen as The Sergeant
- Boris Karloff as Sanders
- Wallace Ford as Morelli
- Reginald Denny as George Brown
- J. M. Kerrigan as Quincannon
- Billy Bevan as Herbert Hale
- Alan Hale as Matlow Cook
- Brandon Hurst as Corporal Bell
- Douglas Walton as Pearson
- Sammy Stein as Abelson
- Howard Wilson as Aviator
- Paul Hanson as Jock MacKay

== Production and casting ==
The film was directed by John Ford, who also directed The World Moves On and Judge Priest in 1934. The script was written by Dudley Nichols and Garrett Fort, based on the 1927 war novel Patrol, by Philip MacDonald. The novel was first adapted in 1929, by Walter Summers, who directed and wrote the film with Victor McLaglen’s younger brother Cyril in the lead role. The novel and movies focus on the psychological strain on a patrol of British soldiers when they become lost in the desert and surrounded by the enemy in Iraq. MacDonald himself served in the British cavalry during World War I in the Mesopotamian campaign.

Richard Dix was cast to play the lead role in The Lost Patrol but he went into another film instead and Victor McLaglen replaced him. McLaglen himself was a World War I veteran, having served as a captain (acting) with the 10th Battalion, Middlesex Regiment. Later he claimed to have served with the Royal Irish Fusiliers. He served for a time as military assistant provost marshal for the city of Baghdad. McLaglen would work with Ford and Nichols again in The Informer. The three of them would win Academy Awards for Best Actor, Best Director and Best Adapted Screenplay.

Already an actor in 1909, Boris Karloff attempted to enlist in the British Army during World War I, but was rejected due to his heart murmur.

Wallace Ford and Reginald Denny, who played Morelli and Brown, had both served in World War I. Ford served in the United States cavalry, while Denny served as an observer/gunner in the Royal Flying Corps. Denny would eventually found a company that made radio-controlled target aircraft during World War II.

=== Filming ===
The Lost Patrol was filmed in Algodones Dunes, California, and Yuma, Arizona. Filming began on August 31 and ended on September 22, 1933. In Algodones Dunes, the temperatures soared and one of the film's producers wound up in the hospital with sunstroke. According to Karloff's biographer Peter Underwood, the temperature on the Yuma locations could be as hot as 150 °F (66 °C) and actors were limited to working two hours a day.

== Reception ==
Film historian Alun Evans in Brassey's Guide to War Films, considered the production, "... something of a classic, if only for the number of copy-cat pictures it spawned." The film made a profit of $84,000. Film reviewer Paul Tatara claims, "Critics have alternately hailed The Lost Patrol as a flawed masterpiece and a failed experiment. In reality, it's probably a little bit of both." In a contemporary review, Mourdant Hall of The New York Times, noted: "In The Lost Patrol, a picture now sojourning at the Rialto, women are conspicuous by their absence. It is an audible adaptation of Philip MacDonald's novel Patrol, which was exhibited here in silent film form several years ago. The present production is highly effective from a photographic standpoint, but the incidents are often strained."

Among its accolades, it was listed as one of the 10 Best Films of 1934 by The New York Times and received a nomination for Best Picture by the National Board of Review, while Max Steiner was nominated for the Academy Award for Original Music Score. On Rotten Tomatoes, the film holds an approval rating of 100% based on 6 reviews, with a weighted average rating of 7.6/10.

== See also ==
- List of American films of 1934
- Mesopotamian Campaign
- Boris Karloff filmography
- Bataan, a 1943 MGM film with a similar plot to The Lost Patrol, and also co-written by Fort and Nichols.
