= Sahara (1995 film) =

Television film by Brian Trenchard-Smith

- Release poster
- Genre: Action; War
- Screenplay by: David Phillips
- Story by: Philip MacDonald
- Directed by: Brian Trenchard-Smith
- Starring: Jim Belushi
- Music by: Garry McDonald; Lawrence Stone
- Countries of origin: United States; Australia
- Original languages: English; German

Production
- Producer: Darryl Sheen
- Cinematography: John Stokes
- Editors: Alan Lake; Patrick Stewart
- Running time: 106 minutes
- Production companies: Village Roadshow Pictures; TriStar Television

Original release
- Network: Showtime
- Release: April 25, 1995

Sahara (also known as Desert Storm) is a 1995 action war television film shot in Australia and directed by Brian Trenchard-Smith and starring Jim Belushi. Sahara is a remake of the 1943 film of the same title starring Humphrey Bogart. The film premiered on Showtime on April 25, 1995.

== Plot ==
In June 1942, on the eve of the Battle of El Alamein, American Sergeant Joe Gunn and the crew of his M3 Lee tank Lulu Belle are the sole survivors of their unit. Boxed in by the enemy, they have no choice but to head south. They come across a group of Allied stragglers at a destroyed first aid station. The stragglers, led by British doctor Captain Halliday, decide to ride with Gunn in an attempt to escape the advancing Afrika Korps. Along the way, they pick up first British Sudanese soldier Tambul and his Italian prisoner, Giuseppe, then downed Luftwaffe pilot Lieutenant von Schletow. The group ends up at a deserted Saharan oasis in search of water. With the Germans right behind them, they decide to stay and defend the well, holding up a battalion of 500 Germans.

The well has completely dried up by then. A standoff and battle of wills begins between Gunn and Major von Falken, the German commander. Gunn keeps up the pretense that the well has much water and negotiates to buy time. Eventually, the Germans attack and are beaten off again and again, but one by one, the defenders are killed. During the fighting, von Schletow, the German flyer, tries to escape, injuring Giuseppe who tries to stop him. Giuseppe is then killed by German fire as he tries to alert Gunn. Tambul chases down and kills von Schletow, but is shot as he returns. Before he dies, he tells the others that the Germans did not learn that the well was dry.

When the German commander attempts to resolve the impasse, embittered "Frenchie" Leroux meets him outside the fort and kills him, only to be shot down by a sniper while returning to his side. Without a leader, the thirst-maddened Germans' final assault turns into a full-blown surrender as they drop their weapons and claw across the sand towards the well. Gunn discovers, to his shock, that a German shell that exploded in the well has tapped into a source of water. Gunn and Bates, the only Allied survivors, disarm the Germans while they drink their fill. Ultimately, a British Long Range Desert Patrol arrives at the oasis to take charge of the prisoners.

== Cast ==
- Jim Belushi as Sergeant Joe Gunn
- Michael Massee as Corporal Jean "Frenchie" Leroux
- Alan David Lee as Osmond Bates
- Jerome Ehlers as Captain Halliday
- Simon Westaway as Marty Williams
- Mark Lee as Jimmy Doyle
- Robert Wisdom as Sergeant Major Tambul
- Paul Empson as Waco Hoyt
- William Upjohn as Casey
- Todd MacDonald as Mike Clarkson
- Alexander Petersons as Major Hans von Falken
- Julian Garner as Lieutenant von Schletow
- Angelo D'Angelo as Giuseppe
- Simon Elrahi as Arabian guide
- Claus Dyson as Sergeant Kraus
- David Slingsby as Captain Mueller
- Mark Gerber as Private Bergmann

== Production ==
The desert duel in Sahara between Lulubelle and a Luftwaffe aircraft featured a period-accurate aircraft and tank.

Director Brian Trenchard-Smith, the son of an Australian officer in the Royal Air Force lived in the UK, but before migrating to Australia, studied filmmaking. Among his 39 movies, five were commissioned by Showtime, including Sahara, the remake of the World War II classic. The film was made on location at Port Stephens, New South Wales, Australia. Some of the German soldiers were played by 130 Royal Australian Air Force (RAAF) and Australian Army personnel.

A Fiat G.59 in Luftwaffe desert camouflage was used in the film. The tank in the film was an M3 Medium Tank from World War II. The version supplied to Australia was the Grant variant, with a different turret. The original 1943 movie differed by having the American version, aka Lee. The commander cupola with the .30 caliber machine gun removed and the tracks used on British Commonwealth M3 Medium Tanks.

== Reception ==
Film historian Alun Evans in Brassey's Guide to War Films, mainly reviewed the earlier 1943 production, but compared and contrasted the two features, noting that the remake had "... sunlight so bright, you need to turn the contrast buttons right down, if you could only say that about the movie."

The New York Times TV reviewer said Belushi "delivers a terrific performance with stunning authority" and the film "proves remarkably effective, bringing us back to a time when good and bad really were quite distinguishable. It's a good yarn, told well once again. And Mr. Belushi's powerful performance could push him to the head of the line on the profitable action-movie circuit."

== See also ==
- List of American films of 1995
- Sahara (1943), the original film
- Nine Men (1943), a similar film about a holdout in the desert

== Notes ==
=== Bibliography ===
- Evans, Alun. Brassey's Guide to War Films. Dulles, Virginia: Potomac Books, 2000. ISBN 1-57488-263-5.
