= Heinrich Greif =

German actor (1907–1946)

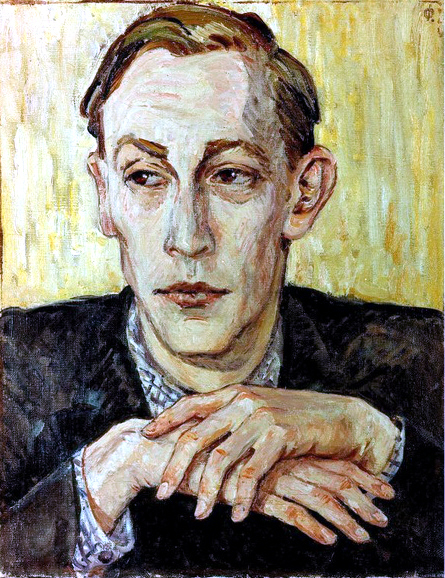
- Born: 11 March 1907; Dresden, German Empire
- Died: 16 July 1946 (aged 39); Berlin, Allied-occupied Germany
- Occupation: Actor
- Years active: 1934–1945

Otto Karl Heinrich Greif (11 March 1907 – 16 July 1946) was a German actor and social activist.

== Biography ==
Heinrich Greif was born 11 March 1907 in Dresden.

Since 1926, he studied in the studio at the theater Volksbühne under the direction of Erwin Piscator.

In 1933, he joined the Communist Party of Germany. After the Nazis' rise to power led to party and trade union work being made illegal, he published the theater magazine Rampa. Soon, he emigrated to Switzerland.

In 1934–1935 he worked in Zurich, then in Moscow, where he worked until 1945 as chief editor of the German edition of Radio Moscow and acted in films.

In 1945, he returned to Germany. He played in Deutsches Theater, and also worked in the administration of culture in Dresden.

He died 16 July 1946 in Berlin during a hernia operation at the clinic Charité. The operation was carried out personally by the head of surgical department, 71-year-old Ferdinand Sauerbruch. By this time, Sauerbruch already showed symptoms of cerebral sclerosis: mistakes were made during the routine operation that caused the death of the actor.

In 1951, the German Democratic Republic was approved Heinrich Greif Prize for outstanding achievements in the field of cinema.
