= Tatyana Barysheva =

Soviet actress

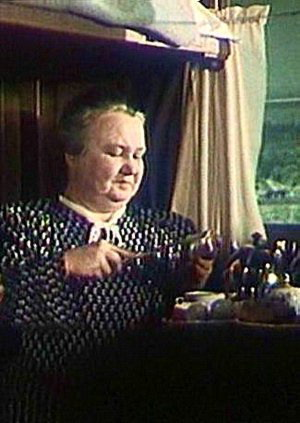
- Tatyana Barysheva as passenger in The Train Goes East (1947).
- Born: Tatyana Semyonovna Barysheva; 31 December 1896; Moscow, Russian Empire
- Died: 10 February 1979 (aged 82); Moscow, Soviet Union
- Occupation: Actor
- Years active: 1925–1968

Tatyana Semyonovna Barysheva (Russian: Татья́на Семёновна Ба́рышева; 31 December 1896 - 10 February 1979) was a Soviet stage and film actress.

== Life ==
Barysheva was born in Moscow. From 1915 to 1918 she was an actress at the Drama Studio of the Moscow Philharmonic. Later she also worked at the Kalyaevsky People's House in Moscow, as well as with theater troupes in Vladimir and Vyatka. In 1945, she became an actress at the Moscow State Film Actor Theater, where she remained until 1957. During her film career of more than forty years, she tended to play comedic character roles. Outside of cinema, she was most active in the vaudeville scene, where her fellow actors nicknamed her "Kolobok" in reference to her rotund physique. In 1977 she moved into a film actors' nursing home in Moscow, and died there two years later.

== Filmography ==
1. 1925 — Moroka (Морока) — peasant girl
2. 1926 — Wings of the Slave (Крылья холопа) — hay girl
3. 1926 — The Reckoning (Расплата) — NEP woman
4. 1927 — Bulat-Batır (Булат-батыр) — the genius of victory
5. 1928 — The Captain's Daughter (Капитанская дочка) — deaconess
6. 1930 — The State Official (Государственный чиновник) — nun
7. 1932 — The High Life (Изящная жизнь) — prostitute
8. 1932 — The Master of the World (Властелин мира) — sentry
9. 1932 — Wings (Крылья) — masseuse
10. 1933 — The Black Barracks (Чёрный барак) — barrack commandant's wife
11. 1933 — Conveyor of Death (Конвейер смерти) — bit part
12. 1933 — One Joy (Одна радость) — philistine
13. 1934 — Petersburg Night (Петербургская ночь) — provincial actress
14. 1934 — The Private Life of Peter Vinograd (Частная жизнь Петра Виноградова) — Senya's mother
15. 1935 — Ball and Heart (Мяч и сердце) - head of children's home
16. 1936 — Chudesnitsa (Чудесница) — milkmaid
17. 1936 — Paris Dawn (Зори Парижа) — bit part
18. 1939 — Vasilisa the Beautiful (Василиса Прекрасная) — Melanya's mother
19. 1939 — Sorochinskaya Fair (Сорочинская ярмарка) — Kuma
20. 1939 — The Foundling (Подкидыш) — dentist
21. 1939 — Night in September (Ночь в сентябре) — Sokolov's wife
22. 1941 — Four Hearts (Сердца четырёх) — Assistant professor Yershova
23. 1941 — The Pig and the Shepherd (Свинарка и пастух) — kolkhoz worker
24. 1941 — The Artamanov Case (Дело Артамоновых) — Barsky's wife
25. 1944 — Six P.M. (В 6 часов вечера после войны) — resident of house number 5
26. 1944 — Girl No. 217 (Человек № 217) — Frau Krauss
27. 1945 — Twins (Близнецы) — orphanage director
28. 1946 — Son of the Regiment (Cын полка) — doctor
29. 1947 — Ballad of Siberia (Сказание о земле Сибирской) — tea party guest
30. 1947 — New House (Новый дом) — Vishnyak's wife
31. 1948 — First-Grade Girl (Первоклассница) — Marisya's grandmother
32. 1949 — The Train Goes East (Поезд идёт на восток) — Claudia Semyonova
33. 1949 — Konstantin Zaslonov (Константин Заслонов) — woman
34. 1950 — Generous Summer (Щедрое лето) — Antonovich's wife
35. 1950 — Zhukovsky (Жуковский) — Arina
36. 1955 — Blue Bird (Синяя птичка) — aunt Nyusya
37. 1955 — The White Poodle (Белый пудель) — nanny
38. 1956 — A Child was Born (Человек родился) — nurse
39. 1963 — Kingdom of Crooked Mirrors (Королевство Кривых Зеркал) — Olya's grandmother
40. 1964 — Jack Frost (Морозко) — matchmaker
41. 1964 — Welcome, or No Trespassing (Добро пожаловать, или Посторонним вход воспрещён) — cook
42. 1968 — Fire, Water, and Brass Pipes (Огонь, вода и… медные трубы) — nurse
