= Mikhail Romm =

Soviet filmmaker (1901–1971)

- Михаил Ромм
- Born: 24 January [O.S. 11 January] 1901; Irkutsk, Russia
- Died: 1 November 1971 (aged 70); Moscow, Soviet Union
- Resting place: Novodevichy Cemetery, Moscow
- Occupations: Film director; screenwriter
- Notable work: Lenin in October (1937); Nine Days in One Year (1962); Triumph Over Violence (1965)
- Title: People's Artist of the USSR (1950)
- Awards: Stalin Prize (1941, 1946, 1948, 1949, 1951)

Mikhail Ilyich Romm (Russian: Михаил Ильич Ромм; 24 January [O.S. 11 January] 1901 – 1 November 1971) was a Soviet film director, screenwriter and pedagogue. He received the title of People's Artist of the USSR in 1950.

== Life and career ==
=== Early life ===
He was born in Irkutsk into a family of mixed Russian Jewish and Russian German descent. He graduated from gymnasium in 1917 and entered the Moscow College for Painting, Sculpture and Architecture. From 1918 to 1921, he served in the Red Army during the Russian Civil War, first as a signalman and later rising to the rank of inspector of a Special Commission concerning the numbers of the Red Army and Fleet (Russian: Особая комиссия по вопросам численности Красной Армии и Флота) of the Field Staff of the Supreme Military Soviet of the Republic (Russian: Полевой штаб Реввоенсовета Республики). As such he traveled a lot and had the opportunity to see much of the life in different parts of the country, something that he later said he "recalled with gratitude".

After the end of his military career, Romm received a scholarship from the Soviet government. In 1925, he graduated as a sculptor from the class of Anna Golubkina of the Highest Artistic-Technical Institute and worked as a sculptor and translator. From 1928 to 1930, he conducted research on the theory of cinema in the Institute for the methods of extra-scholastic work. From 1931 he worked at the Mosfilm studio, first as an assistant, and screen writer.

In October 1934, he co-signed a collective letter to Joseph Stalin from workers in the cinema industry, declaring that "we work in different ways... but we are all inspired with a general desire to express the ideas that inspire the best part of mankind, the ideas of Marx and Lenin, the ideas of the brilliant Leader of the most outstanding and revolutionary party: Joseph Vissarionovich Stalin."

=== Film career ===
Romm's first film, Boule de Suif (1934) was a silent version of Guy de Maupassant's eponymous story. Next he began work on a film version of The Queen of Spades, which he intended to have ready in time for the centenary of the death of its author, the poet Alexander Pushkin. and which was to include large sections of wordless pantomime. In 1936, he commissioned Sergei Prokofiev to write the incidental music. At the same time, he was making another film, Anka. This project embroiled him in a dispute with the deputy head of Mosfilm, Yelena Sokolovskaya, and was never completed. He then accepted a commission to make The Thirteen, a Soviet version of the 1934 American film The Lost Patrol, directed by John Ford. Romm's version was shot in the desert in Turkmenistan.

After the release of The Thirteen in May 1937, Romm returned to work on The Queen of Spades. but was ordered by the head of the film industry, Boris Shumyatsky to break off and make Lenin in October, which he was required to finish in four months, in time for the 20th anniversary of the Bolshevik revolution. While he was working on the screen play, which coincided with the Great Purge, he stayed in the Moscow flat of an assistant director of Mosfilm, Albert Slivkin. On 3 August, uniformed NKVD officers raided the flat and arrested Slivkin, who was shot the following March. Despite that, Romm completed the film in time for Stalin to have a private viewing on 6 November 1937, just before its release. He then returned, again, to work on The Queen of Spades, but in 1938, the project was terminated by the new head of the cinema industry, Semyon Dukelsky, a former NKVD officer whom Romm later described as "an idiot, a son of a bitch... a cretin, a dog."

From 1940 to 1943, he was an artistic leader for the Mosfilm films production. From 1942 to 1947, he was the director of a theater studio for movie actors. From 1938 he was a lecturer, from 1948 he was the leader of the actor's-producer department of the VGIK, professor (from 1962). He educated and influenced many prominent film-directors, including Andrei Tarkovsky, Grigory Chukhray, Vasily Shukshin, Nikita Mikhalkov, Georgiy Daneliya, Alexander Mitta, Igor Talankin, Revaz Chkheidze, Gleb Panfilov, Vladimir Basov, Tengiz Abuladze, Elem Klimov and many others.

Another prominent film of Romm's was about young nuclear physicists; Nine Days in One Year (1962). The documentary Triumph Over Violence, (aka Ordinary Fascism) (1965) about the Third Reich gained over forty million viewers. No other historic documentary won such a numerous audience.

He wrote many books and articles on the theory of cinematographic art, and also memoirs. He was an honorary corresponding member of the Academy of the skills of DDR (1967).

He died in Moscow in 1971.

== Filmography ==
=== Director ===
- Boule de Suif (1934)
- The Thirteen (1936)
- Lenin in October (1937); co-directed with Dmitri Vasilyev
- Lenin in 1918 (1939)
- Dream (1941)
- Girl No. 217 (1945)
- The Russian Question (1947)
- Vladimir Ilyich Lenin (1949); documentary, co-directed with Vasily Belyayev
- Secret Mission (1950)
- Admiral Ushakov (1953)
- Attack from the Sea (1953)
- Murder on Dante Street (1956)
- A Lesson in History (1957); co-directed with Lev Arnshtam and Hristo Piskov
- Nine Days in One Year (1962)
- Boris Shchukin (1963); documentary
- Triumph Over Violence (1965); documentary
- Lenin Is Alive (1969); documentary
- First Pages (1971); documentary
- And Still I Believe... (1974); documentary, finished by Elem Klimov, Marlen Khutsiev and German Lavrov

=== Screenwriter ===
- The Conveyor of Death (1933; co-written with Viktor Gusev and Ivan Pyryev)
- Boule de Suif (1934)
- The Thirteen (1936; co-written with Iosif Prut)
- Dream (1941; co-written with Yevgeny Gabrilovich)
- Girl No. 217 (1945; co-written with Yevgeny Gabrilovich)
- The Russian Question (1947)
- Vladimir Ilyich Lenin (1949; co-written with Vasily Belyayev and Yevgeny Kriger)
- A Weary Road (1956; co-written with Boris Brodsky)
- Murder on Dante Street (1956; co-written with Yevgeny Gabrilovich)
- Nine Days in One Year (1962; co-written with Daniil Khrabrovitsky)
- Boris Shchukin (1963)
- Triumph Over Violence (1965; co-written with Maya Turovskaya and Yuri Khanyutin)
- And Still I Believe... (1974; co-written with Solomon Zenin and Aleksandr Novogrudsky)

=== Narrator ===
- Boris Shchukin (1963)
- Triumph Over Violence (1965)
- And Still I Believe... (1974)

== Awards and honors ==
- Two Orders of Lenin (1938, 1967)
- Honored Art Worker of the RSFSR (1940)
- Stalin Prize first degree (1941) – for films Lenin in October and Lenin in 1918
- Stalin Prize second degree (1946) – for film Girl No. 217
- Stalin Prize first degree (1948) – for film The Russian Question
- Stalin Prize first degree (1949) – for documentary film Vladimir Ilyich Lenin
- Stalin Prize first degree (1951) – for film Secret Mission
- People's Artist of the USSR (1950)
- Order of the Red Banner of Labour (1961)
- Vasilyev Brothers State Prize of the RSFSR (1966) – for film Nine Days in One Year
- Order of the October Revolution (1971)
- Medal "For Valiant Labour in the Great Patriotic War 1941–1945"
- Medal "In Commemoration of the 800th Anniversary of Moscow"
