= Shukshin =

Shukshin (Russian: Шукшин) is a Russian masculine surname, its feminine counterpart is Shukshina. It may refer to

- Lidiya Fedoseyeva-Shukshina (born 1938), Russian actress, wife of Vasily Shukshin
- Maria Shukshina (born 1967), Russian actress, daughter of Lidiya and Vasily
- Vasily Shukshin (1929–1974), Russian actor, writer, screenwriter and movie director
