= Treyvas =

The surname Treyvas, Treivas or Trejvas may refer to:

- Emma Treyvas (1918–1982), Soviet actress
- Andrey Treivas, birth name of Michael Lucas, Russia-born American and Israeli gay porn actor
- Revekka Treivas, wife of Boris Galerkin, Russian mathematician and engineer
- Roza Treyvas, wife of Nikita Khrushchev's son Leonid Khrushchev
- Boris Treyvas (1898–1937), Soviet Komsomol and Bolshevik leader

- Treyvas was also one of the historical names of Treyvaux, Switzerland
