= Lazar Antsi-Polovsky =

- Born: Lazar Yakovlevich Antsi-Polovsky; 28 January 1896
- Died: 30 January 1968 (aged 72)
- Occupations: Film director and actor, screenwriter
- Years active: 1922–1966

Lazar Yakovlevich Antsi-Polovsky (Russian: Ла́зарь Я́ковлевич А́нци-Поло́вский; 28 January 1896 – 30 January 1968) was a Soviet film director, screenwriter and film actor. Honoured Worker of the Arts Industry of the RSFSR (1959).

== Filmography ==
=== Actor ===
- 1922 – Dolya ty russkaya, dolyushka zhenskaya as Panteleimon
- 1922 – The Miracle Maker as Antip the clerk

=== Director ===
- 1938 – If War Comes Tomorrow (co-directed with Yefim Dzigan, Georgy Beryozko and Nikolai Karmazinsky)
