= Bury Me Behind the Baseboard =

- Film poster
- Directed by: Sergey Snezhkin
- Written by: Sergey Snezhkin; Pavel Sanayev
- Produced by: Vladimir Zheleznikov; Mikhail Litvak; Leonid Litvak
- Starring: Aleksandr Drobitko; Svetlana Kryuchkova; Aleksei Petrenko; Maria Shukshina
- Cinematography: Vladislav Gurtchin
- Edited by: Marina Vasilieva
- Music by: Svyatoslav Kurashov
- Production companies: Globus Film Studio; Ministry of Culture
- Distributed by: RUSCICO
- Release date: 3 December 2009
- Running time: 110 minutes
- Country: Russia
- Language: Russian
- Budget: $1 million

Bury Me Behind the Baseboard (Russian: Похорoните меня за плинтусом, romanized: Pokhoronite menya za plintusom) is a 2009 Russian psychological drama film directed by Sergey Snezhkin, based on the autobiographical story of the same name by Pavel Sanayev.

== Plot ==
Eight-year-old Sasha Savelyev lives with his grandmother and actor-grandfather. The boy is not given to his mother. The grandmother takes care of her often ill grandson and brings him up with crazy love, which gradually turns into a real tyranny.

== Cast ==
- Aleksandr Drobitko as Grandson
- Svetlana Kryuchkova as Grandma
- Aleksei Petrenko as Granddad
- Maria Shukshina as Mother
- Konstantin Vorobyov as Tolik
- Valery Kukhareshin as Aaron Moiseevich, homeopath

== Production ==
Actresses Lidiya Fedoseyeva-Shukshina, Elena Sanayeva and Era Ziganshina claimed the role of grandmother.

Svetlana Kryuchkova claims that many of the film's scenes, which made it closer to the book, were cut at the behest of the producers.

== Accolades ==
Winner of the 2009 Nika Award in the categories "Best Actress" (Svetlana Kryuchkova) and "Best Supporting Actress" (Maria Shukshina).
