= On the Same Planet =

- Russian: На одной планете
- Directed by: Ilya Olshvanger
- Written by: Savva Dangulov; Mikhail Papava
- Starring: Innokenty Smoktunovsky; Emma Popova; Yulyen Balmusov; Andro Kobaladze; Panteleymon Krymov
- Cinematography: Yevgeni Shapiro
- Music by: Boris Tishchenko
- Release date: 1965
- Country: Soviet Union
- Language: Russian

On the Same Planet (Russian: На одной планете) is a 1965 Soviet biographical drama film directed by Ilya Olshvanger.

== Plot ==
The film tells about Lieutenant Reshetov, who observes the total collapse of the Russian army and decides to go to Petrograd to kill Lenin.

== Cast ==
- Innokenty Smoktunovsky as Vladimir Lenin
- Emma Popova as Nadezhda Krupskaya
- Yulyen Balmusov as Felix Dzerzhinsky
- Andro Kobaladze as Joseph Stalin
- Panteleymon Krymov
- Yevgeni Lebedev as Yakov Spiridonov
- Pavel Luspekayev as Nikolai Markin
- Nikolay Simonov as Col. Robbins
- Yefim Kopelyan as Spanish Ambassador
- Bruno O'Ya as American journalist
