= The Miracle Maker =

The Miracle Maker may refer to:

- The Miracle Maker (1922 film), Soviet film
- The Miracle Maker (1999 film), animated film
- The Miracle Makers, a 1923 American silent film
