= Strange People =

Strange People may refer to:

- Strange People (1933 film), an American mystery film
- Strange People (1969 film), a Soviet drama film
