= Strange People (1969 film) =

- Russian: Странные люди
- Directed by: Vasily Shukshin
- Written by: Vasily Shukshin
- Produced by: Yakov Zvonkov
- Starring: Vsevolod Sanayev; Panteleymon Krymov; Sergei Nikonenko; Elena Sanayeva; Nina Sazonova; Yevgeni Lebedev
- Cinematography: Valeri Ginzburg
- Edited by: Natalya Loginova
- Music by: Karen Khachaturyan
- Production company: Gorky Film Studio
- Release date: 1969
- Running time: 83 min.
- Country: Soviet Union
- Language: Russian

Strange People (Russian: Странные люди, romanized: Strannye lyudi) is a 1969 Soviet drama film directed by Vasily Shukshin.

The film consists of three short stories, the main characters of which are strange people who live in a village and have a rich inner world.

== Plot ==
=== "Bratka" ===
A young villager, Vaska, travels to Yalta to visit his older brother, who has been living there for some time. The brother, divorced and concerned about "setting up a household," takes Vaska along to visit a single woman, Lidia Nikolaevna, whom he views as a potential partner. Lidia has a young daughter, Masha, who is sent out with a friend while the adults drink and sing with a guitar. The brother explains to Vaska that Lidia’s husband (portrayed in a photograph by Vasily Shukshin himself) left the family due to heavy drinking. Later, the brother mentions another potential match, although he feels it’s less suitable. The next day, Vaska rides the cable cars and decides to return to his village. At home, he lies, claiming he never visited his brother, having lost his money and spent three days with a friend in the district center.

=== "The Fatal Shot" ===
In a Siberian village, a group of young hunters arrives to join an elderly hunter, Bronka, on a hunting trip. Bronka’s wife pleads with him to behave, as she’s tired of the gossip in the village. During a break, Bronka asks the group if they’ve heard about the attempts on Hitler’s life. He claims there were actually two, though the second remains unknown. He recounts a story from June 1943 when, as a young medic, he was chosen to impersonate a captured German officer due to their resemblance. His mission was to assassinate Hitler during a visit to the front. Dressed as the officer and carrying a package for the Führer, Bronka infiltrated the bunker but missed his shot with a Browning pistol. Despite the passion in his story, its truth remains ambiguous.

=== "Thoughts" ===
This tale follows Kolka, a young villager wrestling with creative struggles. To the other villagers, Kolka seems odd—always deep in thought, carving wooden figurines, and in no hurry to marry or embrace the monotony of daily rural life. He attempts to sculpt a figure of Stenka Razin, a historical figure, though no one understands why he bothers with such a trivial pursuit. One day, the village elder, Matvey, strikes up a conversation with Kolka and realizes the carving is Kolka's way of interpreting the historical significance of Razin. Matvey advises him to ignore the ridicule of others and continue his creative work.

== Cast ==
- Vsevolod Sanayev as Matvey Ivanovich Ryazantsev
- Panteleymon Krymov as Veniamin Zakharovich Dulich, history teacher
- Sergei Nikonenko as Vasya
- Elena Sanayeva as Ryazantsev's daughter
- Nina Sazonova as Ryazantsev's wife
- Yevgeny Yevstigneyev as Vasya's brother
- Lidiya Fedoseyeva-Shukshina as Lidiya Nikolaevna
- Maria Shukshina as Mashenka
- Yevgeni Lebedev as Bronislav Ivanovich Pupkov
- Lyubov Sokolova as Alyona, Pupkov's wife
- Viktor Avdyushko as collective farm chairman
