= McMafia =

British crime drama television series

- Genre: Crime drama
- Created by: Hossein Amini; James Watkins
- Based on: McMafia: A Journey Through the Global Criminal Underworld by Misha Glenny
- Directed by: James Watkins
- Starring: James Norton; David Strathairn; Juliet Rylance; Merab Ninidze; Aleksey Serebryakov; Maria Shukshina; Angel Woodland; David Dencik; Oshri Cohen; Sofia Lebedeva; Caio Blat; Kirill Pirogov; Nawazuddin Siddiqui; Karel Roden
- Composers: Tom Hodge; Franz Kirmann
- Countries of origin: United Kingdom; United States
- No. of series: 1
- No. of episodes: 8

Production
- Executive producers: Nick Marston; Dixie Linder; Ben Hall; Robyn Slovo; Matthew Read; Hossein Amini; James Watkins; Misha Glenny
- Producer: Paul Ritchie
- Production company: Cuba Pictures

Original release
- Network: BBC One (UK); AMC (USA)
- Release: 1 January – 11 February 2018

McMafia is a British crime drama television series created by Hossein Amini and James Watkins, and directed by Watkins. It is inspired by the non-fiction book McMafia: A Journey Through the Global Criminal Underworld by journalist Misha Glenny (2008). The series stars James Norton as Alex Godman, the British-raised son of a Russian mafia boss living in London whose father is trying to escape from the world of organised crime. It is co-produced by BBC, AMC Networks, and Cuba Pictures. It premiered in the United Kingdom on BBC One on 1 January 2018, and in the United States on AMC on 26 February 2018. The series was canceled after one season.

== Cast ==
=== Main cast ===
- James Norton as Alex Godman, a young financier who, under the influence of circumstances, begins to cooperate with the Russian mafia and the Mexican cartel
- David Strathairn as Semiyon Kleiman, Russian-Israeli businessman and politician linked to the Israeli mafia
- Juliet Rylance as Rebecca Harper, Alex's fiancée
- Merab Ninidze as Vadim Kalyagin, powerful member of the Russian mafia
- Aleksey Serebryakov as Dimitri Godman, Alex's father, businessman and Russian mafia ex-member
- Maria Shukshina as Oksana Godman, Alex's mother
- Faye Marsay as Katya Godman, Alex's sister
- David Dencik as Boris Godman, Alex's uncle associated with the Israeli mafia and Russian mafia
- Oshri Cohen as Joseph, Israeli bodyguard working for Kleiman
- Sofia Lebedeva as Lyudmilla Nikolayeva, beauty therapist
- Caio Blat as Antonio Mendez, Colombian gangster working for a Mexican cartel
- Kirill Pirogov as Ilya Fedorov, Vadim's right-hand man, special services officer
- Nawazuddin Siddiqui as Dilly Mahmood, Kleiman's Indian business partner and Mumbai gangster
- Karel Roden as Karel Benes, Czech gangster

=== Recurring cast ===
- Yuval Scharf as Tanya
- Anna Levanova as Natasha
- Clifford Samuel as Femi
- Maria Mashkova as Masha
- Kemi-Bo Jacobs as Karin
- Atul Kale as Benny Chopra, Mumbai gangster, Vadim's Indian business partner
- Evgeni Golan as Marat, gangster and hitman, an enforcer working for Vadim
- Eve Parmiter as Jennifer
- Tim Ahern as Sydney Bloom, an English financier who preached the need for ethical business, made his fortune on financial scams in Africa
- Ellie Piercy as Sandrine
- Danila Kozlovsky as Grigory Mishin, businessman linked to the Russian mafia
- Alexander Dyachenko as Oleg, diplomat at the Russian embassy
- Fernando Cayo as Guillermo Alegre, Mexican cartel boss
- Lidiya Fedoseyeva-Shukshina as Vadim Kalyagin's mother

== Production ==
McMafia was inspired by journalist Misha Glenny's non-fiction book McMafia: A Journey Through the Global Criminal Underworld, published in 2008. The series took a few stories from Glenny's book, which documents various mafia organisations thriving around the world today. The series was created by Hossein Amini and James Watkins, and is a co-production of the BBC, AMC, and Cuba Pictures, in association with Twickenham Studios.

The BBC announced the series in October 2015. In April 2016, it was announced that James Norton had been cast in the lead role of Alex Godman and that co-creator Watkins would direct all eight episodes. Additional casting, including Maria Shukshina and Aleksey Serebryakov as Alex's parents, and David Strathairn as a shady Israeli businessman, was announced in November 2016. In addition to Amini and Watkins, David Farr, Peter Harness, and Laurence Coriat co-wrote the series.

Filming locations included London, Zagreb, Split, Opatija, Primošten, Qatar, Mumbai, Prague, Cairo, Belgrade, Belize, Istanbul, Moscow and Tel Aviv. The budget was several million pounds per episode.

== Episodes ==
No. in series	Title	Directed by	Written by	Original release date	UK viewers (millions)
1	"Episode 1"	James Watkins	Hossein Amini and James Watkins	1 January 2018	9.82
Russian businessman and gangster Vadim Kalyagin avoids an assassination attempt in Dubai. In London, Alex Godman runs a small hedge fund. He is the son of former gangster Dimitri Godman, who was run out of Russia by Vadim. When rumours of illegality hit Alex's fund, he turns to his uncle Boris for help securing new investors. They travel to Tel Aviv to meet Boris's friend Semiyon Kleiman, a Knesset member who wants Alex to launder money for him. Alex refuses, and discovers Boris spread the rumours to force Alex to do business with Semiyon. Alex confronts Boris just as Boris is murdered by Vadim's men. Alex narrowly escapes, and learns from Semiyon that Boris planned Vadim's failed assassination to reclaim the Godman family legacy. Saying that the Godman's will not remain safe from Vadim, Semiyon asks Alex's help to overthrow Vadim via business domination. He has Alex travel to Versailles to ostensibly ask Vadim's forgiveness. Vadim asks whether Alex wants peace or war.
2	"Episode 2"	James Watkins	Hossein Amini and James Watkins	2 January 2018	8.67
A young woman, Lyudmilla, arrives in Cairo to take up a job as a beautician, only to find she has been deceived and kidnapped by human traffickers. Semiyon seeks to take control of Mumbai from Vadim and needs allies requiring money. He uses Alex Godman to transfer the money through his investment company which Alex does concealing the facts from his staff. Lyudmilla held with three other girls discovers the ruthlessness of the traffickers. Alex is called to Prague by Semiyon who is trying to unseat Vadim from his smuggling operations. Alex's father attempts suicide. Lyudmilla is passed to traffickers in Israel and selected by Semiyon's personal assistant Tanya.
3	"Episode 3"	James Watkins	David Farr and Hossein Amini	7 January 2018	7.46
Semiyon grows his business empire in Prague and Mumbai and a concerned Vadim goes to Prague looking for answers. Semiyon also has plans for a high class casino ship in Israeli waters and Tanya coaches Ludymilla to use her sexuality to discover secrets from Semiyon's prospective business partners. Rebecca, Alex's girlfriend, is approached by Antonio Mendez claiming to be Alex's old friend from university. Mendez phones Alex, who does not know him, and arranges a meeting at his villa in the South of France which he accepts taking Rebecca, as requested, with him to find out what the man wants. Mendez wants to use Semiyon's ships to bring drugs into Europe. Alex proposes to Rebecca.
4	"Episode 4"	James Watkins	David Farr and Hossein Amini	14 January 2018	6.74
Semiyon advises Alex not to do business with the Mexican cartel. Alex employs a computer expert to conceal his dealings with Semiyon from his staff. Rebecca is concerned about Alex when she discovers he has a second phone, which he lies about, she takes her concern to his father. Semiyon uses his contacts to discover the whereabouts of Vadim's drugs in Mumbai. Semiyon leaves the decision to steal the drugs to Alex warning him there will be repercussions. Rebecca confronts Alex about his dealings with Semiyon, but unknown to her he has authorised the theft.
5	"Episode 5"	James Watkins	Laurence Coriat and Hossein Amini	21 January 2018	6.49
Alex and Semiyon disagree on how to keep the pressure on Vadim. Semiyon is arrested for homosexual rape and Lyudmilla sees a way to escape Semiyon's employment; but she needs Alex as a go-between. Rebecca meets Antonio for advice about Alex's business dealings. Masha confides to Katya, Alex's sister, that she is pregnant by Dimitri. To have the charges dropped, Alex blackmails Semiyon to allow his ships to smuggle Antonio's drugs and release Lyudmilla. He agrees to the former but not the latter.
6	"Episode 6"	James Watkins	Laurence Coriat and Hossein Amini	28 January 2018	6.33
Alex poaches Semiyon's employee to organise a bodyguard team in London to protect his parents and sister. Furthermore Alex provokes a temporary split with his unsuspecting fiancée Rebecca, who moves into a separate apartment. The idea is to remove her from the threat posed by Vadim's thugs, but the ruse is exposed by visiting Benes who has been pressed into Vadim's service. Rebecca is shot in the stomach, but is saved by Alex's bodyguard arriving in time to kill the assassin.
7	"Episode 7"	James Watkins	Peter Harness and Hossein Amini	4 February 2018	6.15
Alex confesses to his family his mafia entanglements. His hospitalised fiancée, Rebecca, has lost Alex's baby and disowns him. His father insists on protecting the family using old Russian contacts, leading to two outcomes. First, Alex meets Vadim and Semiyon in Istanbul to sue for peace with Vadim. Alex nevertheless does not trust Vadim and forges an alliance with Antonio and his Mexican mafioso colleague. Secondly, Dimitri's hitmen targeting Vadim in Russia accidentally kill Vadim's cherished daughter Natasha instead.
8	"Episode 8"	James Watkins	Peter Harness and Hossein Amini	11 February 2018	6.31
Alex flies to Moscow unaware of his father's actions and is detained by Ilya's agents. He escapes and is protected by his bodyguard and Lyudmilla, now reunited with her grateful parents. Meanwhile Ilya's boss at the Russian secret service criticises Ilya's loyalty to Vadim. In a business meeting with Mexican and Russian drug oligarchs, Alex secures his position as a powerful mafioso, even cutting out Antonio. Secret service agents shoot and wound Vadim who escapes to an apartment and then faces Alex in a final confrontation.

== Reception ==
McMafia has an approval rating of 71% on review aggregator website Rotten Tomatoes, based on 38 reviews, and an average rating of 6.7/10.

Lucy Mangan, writing for The Guardian said that the show was "beautifully put together" and described the script as "a cut above average".

== Future ==
In 2018, BBC One announced that it had recommissioned the programme for an eight-part second series.

In March 2022, it was reported that the planned second series had been cancelled, but author and executive producer Misha Glenny immediately denied the report on Twitter.

On 25 April 2025, Misha Glenny confirmed "with great sadness" that McMafia had been cancelled; despite having come "close to filming" the second series twice.
