= Ivanna (1959 film) =

1959 film by Viktor Ivchenko

- Directed by: Viktor Ivchenko
- Written by: Vladimir Belyaev
- Starring: Inna Burduchenko; Anatoly Motornyi
- Cinematography: Aleksei Prokolenko
- Edited by: L. Mkhitartants
- Music by: Lev Olevskiy; Anatoliy Svechnikov
- Production company: Dovzhenko Film Studios
- Release date: 1959
- Running time: 90 minutes
- Country: Soviet Union
- Language: Russian

Ivanna (Russian: «Иванна») is a 1959 Soviet anti-religious drama film directed by Viktor Ivchenko. It was seen by 30.2 million viewers in the USSR.

== Plot ==
The film is set in the year 1940. Ivanna Stavnichaya, the daughter of Greek Catholic priest Theodos, goes to Lviv University, which opened after the establishment of Soviet power. However, the secretary of the admission committee, a hidden nationalist, declares to the girl that she was not accepted because of "social origin". Ivanna accuses the Soviet authorities of injustice, while in fact her fiancé, the fanatical Greek Catholic Roman Hereta, hid from her the truth about the call to study which came from the university. Upset Ivanna asks for help from Metropolitan Andrey Sheptytsky, head of the Greek Catholic church in Ukraine, and he advises Ivanna to go to the monastery.

The Second World War begins, the Germans enter Lviv. Ivanna sees the ministers of the church cooperating with the invaders, blessing the massacre of partisans, Jews and civilians. Ivanna's girlfriend, Julia, joins up the girl with the partisans. Ivanna enters their detachment, but the Ukrainian Greek Catholics learn about this and begin hunting for the young partisan ... Ivanna's life ends tragically - the German invaders arrest her and after cruel torture execute her.

== Cast ==
- Inna Burduchenko as Ivanna
- Anatoly Motornyi as Theodosius Stavnycyi
- Dana Kruk as Yulya, a friend of Ivanna
- Did Panas as Panas Stepanovych Holub
- Evgeny Ponomarenko as comrade Taras Sadakly
- Vladimir Goncharov as captain Zhurzhenko
- Vladimir Arkushenko as Mykola Andriovych Zubar, senior lieutenant of the NKVD
- Anatoly Yurchenko as Oleksa Gavrylyshyn
- Lev Olevsky as Émile Léger, French musician
- Dmitry Stepovoi as metropolitan Andrey Sheptytsky
- Olga Nozhkina as abbess
- Georgi Polinsky as Dasko
- Alexander Korotkevich as "railwayman"
- Vladimir Dalsky as oberfuhrer Alfred Dietz
- Vyacheslav Voronin as Roman Gereta, the fiancé of Ivanna
- Boris Mirus as Dmytro Andriovych Kablak, Secretary of the Admission Committee
- Vasily Fushchych as Zenon Verhola
- Maria Kapnist as nun

== Anathema ==
The film, released in 1960 in Catholic Poland, was anathematized by Pope John XXIII.
