= Petro Vesklyarov =

Soviet and Ukrainian actor (1911–1994)

Petro Yukhymovych Vesklyarov
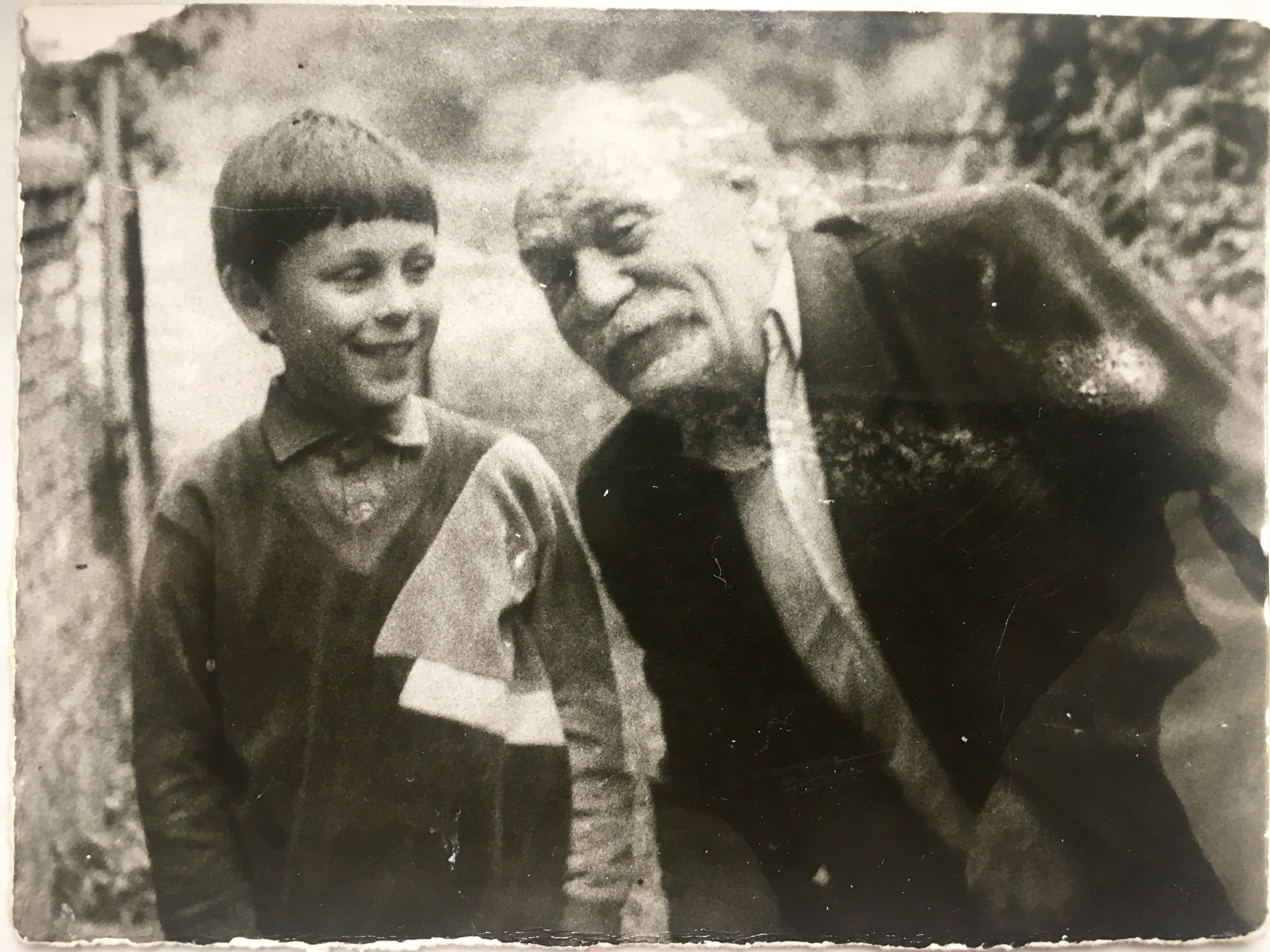
- Panas with his grandson Andriy
- Born: Pinchas Chaimovich Wechsler; June 10, 1911; Talne, Umansky Uyezd, Kiev Governorate, Russian Empire (now Ukraine)
- Died: January 5, 1994 (aged 82); Kyiv, Ukraine
- Other name: Did Panas
- Occupations: Theater and television actor

Petro Yukhymovych Vesklyarov (Ukrainian: Вескляров Петро Юхимович; 10 June [O.S. 28 May] 1911 in Talne, Ukraine – January 5, 1994 in Kyiv) was a Soviet and Ukrainian theater and television actor.He was also known by the nickname Did Panas (Grandpa Panas, Ukrainian: дід Панас).

Born Pinchas Wechsler, Vesklyarov was an actor in a travelling workers' theatre between 1932 and 1940, and between 1946 and 1959 he performed at the Taras Shevchenko Musical-Drama Theatre in Lutsk, Volyn. Between 1959 and 1982 Veslklyarov worked in the Dovzhenko Film Studios, appearing in a number of films. He starred in the 1959 drama film Ivanna and appeared in the 1970 comedy film Two Days of Miracles. During this time (1964–1986) he appeared as the character "Дід Панас" (Grandpa Panas) in the television series "На добраніч, діти" (Goodnight, children).

In 1973, he was awarded the title Meritorious Artist of the Ukrainian SSR.

== Commemoration ==
He was buried in the columbarium of the Baikove cemetery. The widow left for the United States, before handing over the films with the recordings of "Grandpa Panas" to the Kapranov brothers.

In 2019, a memorial plaque was installed on the premises of the Talne school, where the house where Petro Veskliarov was born stood. In 2022, in Talne, Cherkasy region, Krylov Street became Veskliarov Street.
