= Leonid Kuravlyov =

Soviet and Russian film actor (1936–2022)

- Леонид Куравлёв
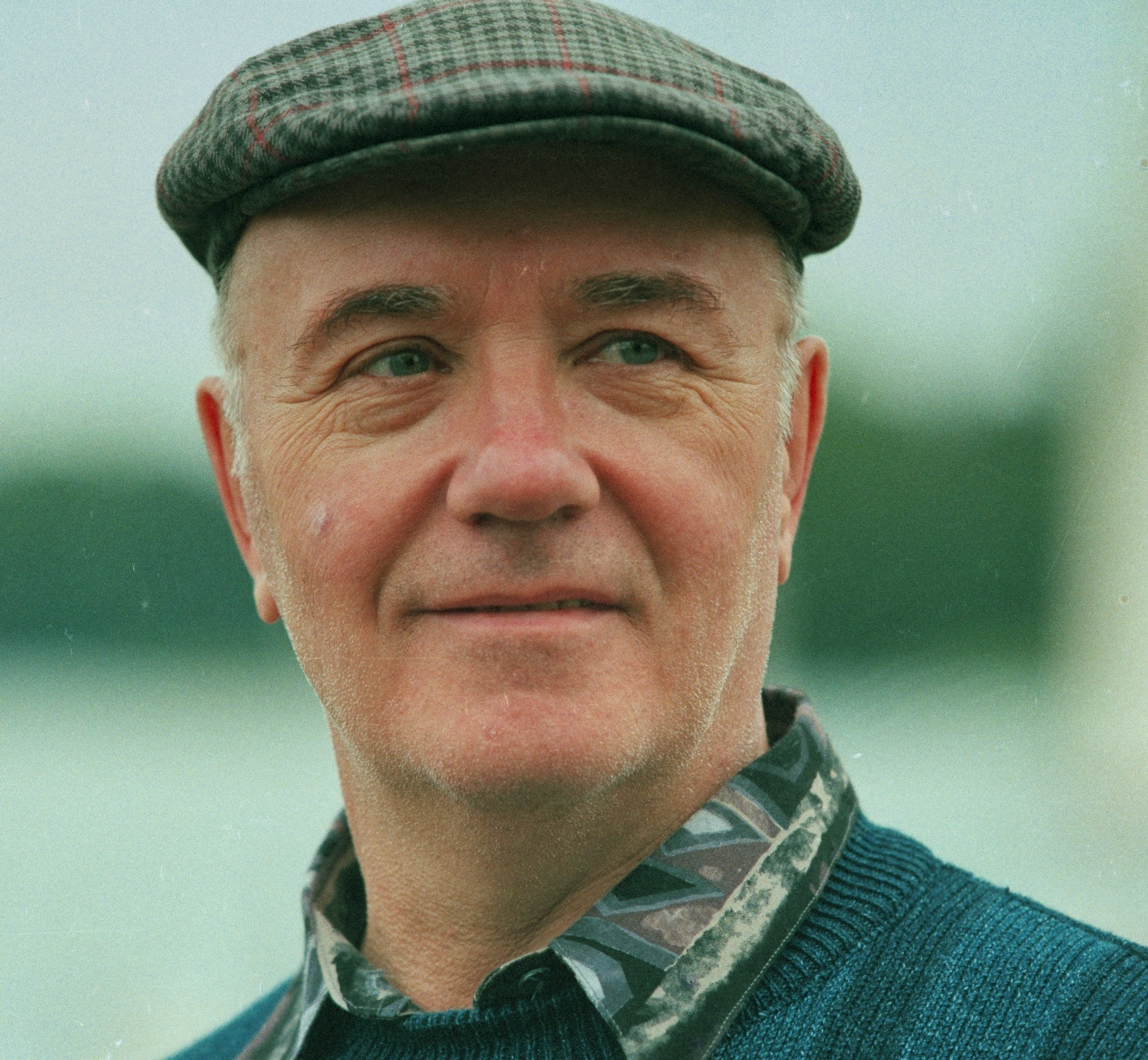
- Kuravlyov in 1997
- Born: Leonid Vyacheslavovich Kuravlyov; 8 October 1936; Moscow, Russian SFSR, Soviet Union
- Died: 30 January 2022 (aged 85); Moscow, Russia
- Occupation: Actor
- Years active: 1959–2015
- Spouse: Nina Kuravlyova (m. 1960; died 2012)
- Children: 2

Leonid Vyacheslavovich Kuravlyov (Russian: Леонид Вячеславович Куравлёв; 8 October 1936 – 30 January 2022) was a Soviet and Russian film actor. He became a People's Artist of the RSFSR in 1976.

== Early life ==
Kuravlyov was born in Moscow into a working-class family. His father Vyacheslav Yakovlevich Kuravlyov (1909–1979) worked as a locksmith at the Salyut Machine-Building Association and his mother Valentina Dmitriyevna Kuravlyova (1916–1993) was a hairdresser. In 1941, with the start of the Nazi invasion of the Soviet Union (known in Russia as the Great Patriotic War) his mother was arrested on a false report, accused of counter-revolutionary activity (Article 58) and exiled to Karaganda, Kazakh SSR to work at the local plant. In five years, she was freed without a right to live in Moscow and sent to Zasheyek, Murmansk Oblast in the Russian far north where she continued working as a hairdresser. In 1948, she managed to get permission to see her son who spent a year with her at Zasheyek, and in 1951 she finally returned to Moscow.

== Career ==
In 1955 Kuravlyov entered VGIK to study acting under Boris Bibikov. He graduated in 1960 and joined the Theater Studio of Film Actors. He made his first movie appearances while still a student. In 1960, he was noted by Vasily Shukshin and took part in his diploma film Reported From Lebyazhye. In 1961, they both starred in the popular melodrama When the Trees Were Tall, and in 1964, Shukshin gave him the leading role in his comedy movie There Is Such a Lad which brought Kuravlyov true fame and which he considered to be the start of his successful movie career. He also acted in Your Son and Brother (1965) and felt so grateful for what the director did for him that he later named his son after Shukshin.

The role of Shura Balaganov in Mikhail Schweitzer's comedy The Little Golden Calf based on the book by Ilf and Petrov was one of his first successful roles: he managed to create an image of a brash yet charming petty thief. His other notable roles of that period include Khoma Brut in one of the first Soviet horror movies Viy (1967), antagonist Sorokin in a psychological melodrama Not Under the Jurisdiction (1969), Robinson Crusoe in Stanislav Govorukhin's Life and Amazing Adventures of Robinson Crusoe (1972), a Nazi officer Kurt Eismann in Seventeen Moments of Spring (1973) and Lavr Mironovich in Pyotr Todorovsky's The Last Victim (1975).

In the 1970s, he appeared in three to four films per year. Even though Kuravlyov was adept at playing serious dramatic roles, he is still best known for his leading roles in top-grossing comedy movies such as Afonya (1975) by Georgiy Daneliya (11th highest-grossing Soviet film, highest-grossing film of the year, 62.2 mln viewers), Leonid Gaidai's Ivan Vasilievich: Back to the Future (1973, 17th highest-grossing film, 60 mln viewers) and It Can't Be! (1975, 46th highest-grossing film with 46.9 mln viewers), The Most Charming and Attractive (1985) by Gerald Bezhanov (the highest-grossing film of 1985, 44.9 mln viewers) and others.

According to Russian actress Lidiya Fedoseyeva-Shukshina, after being tipsy, Kuravlyov openly spoke about his negative attitude towards the leadership of the Soviet Union. She recalled that, drunk, he had opened the window at her house and had shouted to the whole street that he hated the Soviet regime. She had feared that "the police would come and take everyone away as rebels."

=== Later years ===
During the late 1990s he hosted a popular TV programme The World of Books with Leonid Kuravlyov where he talked about new book releases. In two years it was closed and then relaunched with new hosts. In 2012, he was awarded the IV class Order "For Merit to the Fatherland".

Kuravlyov was a devoted Christian, a member of the Russian Orthodox Church.

In 2014, Kuravlyov along with 100 other Russian members of culture signed an open letter in support of Vladimir Putin's position regarding Ukraine and Crimea. In his last years Kuravlyov lived in a nursing home where he was diagnosed with dementia.

In January 2022, he was hospitalized with pneumonia. According to Kuravlyov's son, tests for COVID-19 were negative.

=== Death ===
Kuravlyov died from pneumonia on 30 January 2022, at the age of 85.

== Selected filmography ==
- All that Jam (Весь этот джем, 2015) as Father Leonty
- The Book of Masters (Книга Мастеров, 2009)
- The Heirs (Наследники, 2008)
- Streets of Broken Lights (Улицы разбитых фонарей, 2005) as Ershov, police colonel
- Brigada (Бригада, 2002) as MVD general
- The Aristocratic Peasant Girl (Барышня-крестьянка, 1995) as Grigory Muromsky
- Shirli-Myrli (Ширли-мырли, 1995) as US Ambassador to Russia
- The Master and Margarita (Мастер и Маргарита, 1994) as Bosoy, chairman of housing association
- Weather Is Good on Deribasovskaya, It Rains Again on Brighton Beach (На Дерибасовской хорошая погода или на Брайтон-Бич опять идут дожди, 1992) as President of USSR Mikhail Gorbachev'
- The Stairway (Лестница, 1989) as Uncle Misha
- Private Detective, or Operation Cooperation (Частный детектив, или Операция "Кооперация", 1989) as editor in chief
- Entrance to the Labyrinth (Вход в лабиринт, 1989) as Lev Khlebnikov
- Yolki-palki (Ёлки-палки!, 1988) as electrician
- The Left-Hander (Левша, 1987) as Emperor Alexander I Pavlovich
- The Twentieth Century Approaches (Двадцатый век начинается, 1986) as Von Bork
- The Most Charming and Attractive (Самая обаятельная и привлекательная, 1985) as Misha Dyatlov
- Dangerous for Your Life! (Опасно для жизни!, 1985) as Spartak Molodtsov
- TASS Is Authorized to Declare... (ТАСС уполномочен заявить..., 1984) as Zotov
- The Invisible Man (Человек-невидимка, 1984) as Thomas Marvel
- The Trust That Has Burst (Трест, который лопнул, 1984) as Farmer Ezra Plunkett
- Copper Angel (Медный ангел, 1984) as Larsen, professor
- We Are from Jazz (Мы из джаза, 1984) as Samsonov
- Look for a Woman (Ищите женщину, 1983) as Inspector Granden
- Vitya Glushakov - A Friend of the Apaches (Витя Глушаков — друг апачей, 1983)
- Simply Awful! (Просто ужас!, 1982) as Ruslan Ivanovich
- Ladies Invite Gentlemen (Дамы приглашают кавалеров, 1980)
- Borrowing Matchsticks (За спичками, 1980) as peasant
- The Meeting Place Cannot Be Changed (Место встречи изменить нельзя, 1979) as "Kopchyony", thief
- Little Tragedies (Маленькие трагедии, 1979) as Leporello, servant of Don Juan
- Tailcoat for Scapegrace (Фрак для шалопая, 1979) as police captain Deev
- Incognito from St. Petersburg (Инкогнито из Петербурга, 1977) as Shpekin, postmaster
- Mimino (Мимино, 1977) as Professor Khachikyan
- Timur and His Team (Тимур и его команда, 1976) as Georgiy Garaev, Timur's uncle
- You to Me, Me to You (Ты — мне, я — тебе, 1976) as Ivan Kashkin / Sergei Kashkin
- Afonya (Афоня, 1975) as Afanasy Borshchov
- The Flight of Mr. McKinley (Бегство мистера Мак-Кинли, 1975) as Mr. Droot
- It Can't Be! (Не может быть!, 1975) as Vladimir Zavitushkin
- Circus in the Circus (Соло для слона с оркестром, 1974) as Grísa
- Seventeen Moments of Spring (Семнадцать мгновений весны, 1973) as Kurt Eismann
- Ivan Vasilievich: Back to the Future (Иван Васильевич меняет профессию, 1973) as George Miloslavsky, burglar
- This Merry Planet (Эта весёлая планета, 1973) as Y
- Life and Amazing Adventures of Robinson Crusoe (Жизнь и удивительные приключения Робинзона Крузо, 1972) as Robinson Crusoe
- Two Days of Miracles (Два дня чудес, 1970) as Vadim Murashev
- Liberation (Освобождение, 1970) as Chuikov's signaler
- Shine, Shine, My Star (Гори, гори, моя звезда, 1970)
- The Beginning (Начало, 1970) as Arkady
- The Little Golden Calf (Золотой телёнок, 1968) as Shura Balaganov
- A Literature Lesson (Урок литературы, 1968)
- Time, Forward! (Время, вперед!, 1968) as Korneyev
- Viy (Вий, 1967) as Khoma Brutus
- Older Sister (Старшая сестра, 1966) as Volodya
- Your Son and Brother (Ваш сын и брат, 1965) as Stepan Voyevodin
- There Is Such a Lad (Живёт такой парень, 1964) as Pashka Kolokolnikov
- The Little Golden Calf as Shura Balaganov
- Michman Panin (Мичман Панин, 1960) as stoker Pyotr Kamushkin
- There Will Be No Leave Today (Сегодня увольнения не будет ... , 1959)
