= Green Chains =

- Russian: Зелёные цепочки
- Directed by: Grigori Aronov
- Written by: German Matveyev; Feliks Mironer
- Starring: Aleksandr Grigoryev; Igor Urumbekov; Vladimir Leletko; Pavel Luspekayev; Oleg Belov; Aleksey Mikhaylov
- Cinematography: Nikolai Zhilin
- Edited by: O. Ivanova
- Music by: Isaac Schwarts
- Release date: 1970
- Country: Soviet Union
- Language: Russian

Green Chains (Russian: Зелёные цепочки) is a 1970 Soviet adventure film directed by Grigori Aronov.

== Plot ==
The film takes place in the summer of 1941. Styopa and Misha return to their native Leningrad from a pioneer camp and meet a one-armed man on the way, whom they decide to help. Suddenly, a bombardment begins, which tears them apart, and the luggage of the man remains with the guys. Returning to Leningrad, they open their suitcase and find fascist missiles there, as a result of which they go in search of a one-armed man.

== Cast ==
- Aleksandr Grigoryev as Mishka Alakseyev
- Igor Urumbekov as Vaska Kozhukh
- Vladimir Leletko as Styopka Panfilov
- Pavel Luspekayev as Ivan Vasilyevich
- Oleg Belov as Alesey Burakov
- Aleksey Mikhaylov
- Fyodor Odinokov as Semyon Semyonov (as F. Odinokov)
- Andrey Krupenin as Shurka
- Aristarkh Livanov as Zhorka
- Aleksandr Lipov as Valeriy Kuplanov
