= Your Son and Brother =

- Directed by: Vasily Shukshin
- Written by: Vasily Shukshin
- Cinematography: Valery Ginzburg
- Music by: Pavel Chekalov
- Production companies: Gorky Film Studio; Second Creative Association
- Release date: 1966
- Running time: 87 minutes
- Country: Soviet Union

Your Son And Brother (Russian: Ваш сын и брат, romanized: Vash syn i brat) is a 1966 Soviet drama film directed by Vasily Shukshin. The film is based on Vasily Shukshin's short stories Styopka (Стёпка), Ignat Has Arrived (Игнат приехал) and Snake Poison (Змеиный яд).

== Plot ==
An old man named Yermolai Voyevodin lives in a Siberian village. He has four sons and a daughter. They all have different lives. The oldest one - Ignat, moves to Moscow and begins to perform at a circus. He is happy with his life and manages to seduce his brother, Maxim, into coming to the capital. Maxim finds a job as a laborer at a construction site, but constantly feels loneliness. He longs for his village, but he is too proud to come back home. Another son, Stepan, gets into a "righteous" fight and goes to prison. Three months before his official release, Stepan escapes from prison and returns to his village to see his relatives and his homeland and to find strength to serve his sentence, as he calls it. The old man is left with his favorite son Vasily and a mute daughter Verka. Yermolai is very emotional over the breakup of his family and dreams of getting all of his sons together under his roof, but will his dream ever come true? Father blames Ignat for bragging, says that he is playing the fool in the city, calls on to use his strength in his homeland. Ignat does not understand him, he does not want to live in the village.

== Cast ==
- Vsevolod Sanayev as Yermolai Voyevodin
- Leonid Kuravlyov as Stepan Voyevodin
- Anastasia Filippova as mother
- Marta Grakhova as Vera Voyevodina
- Aleksei Vanin as Ignaty Voyevodin
- Leonid Reutov as Maxim Voyevodin
- Viktor Shakhov as Vasily Voyevodin
- Nikolai Grabbe as Nikolai Ivanovich
- Alexandra Dorokhina as Sasha
- Svetlana Zhgun as Nyurka
- Vadim Zakharchenko as doctor
- Olesya Ivanova as Claudia
- Leonid Knyazev as Ivan Egorov, Claudia's husband
- Svetlana Kharitonova as pharmacist

== Awards ==
1967 Vasilyev Brothers State Prize of the RSFSR (Valery Ginzburg, Vsevolod Sanaev, Vasily Shukshin)
