= Vitya Glushakov - A Friend of the Apaches =

1983 Soviet children's comedy film

- Russian: Витя Глушаков — друг апачей
- Directed by: Gerald Bezhanov
- Written by: Gerald Bezhanov; Anatoly Eyramdzhan
- Starring: Leonid Kuravlyov; Andrei Yuritsyn; Ekaterina Semyonova; Vladimir Lizunov; Roman Dolgov
- Cinematography: Sergei Zajtsev
- Music by: Vladimir Rubashevsky
- Release date: 1983
- Country: Soviet Union
- Language: Russian

Vitya Glushakov - A Friend of the Apaches (Russian: Витя Глушаков — друг апачей) is a 1983 Soviet children's comedy film directed by Gerald Bezhanov.

== Plot ==
A dreamer, Vita, writes a novel about the life of the Apache and gets acquainted on a tram with the unemployed Arkady, whose life as a result makes sense.

== Cast ==
- Leonid Kuravlyov
- Andrei Yuritsyn
- Ekaterina Semyonova
- Vladimir Lizunov
- Roman Dolgov
- Igor Yasulovich
- Yevgeniya Sabelnikova
- Galina Polskikh
- Mikhail Kokshenov
- Anna Varpakhovskaya
