= Pavel Luspekayev =

Soviet actor

- Born: Pavel Bogdasarovich Luspekan; 20 April 1927; Luhansk, Ukrainian SSR, Soviet Union
- Died: 17 April 1970 (aged 42); Moscow, Russian SFSR, Soviet Union
- Education: Mikhail Shchepkin Higher Theatre School
- Occupation: Actor
- Years active: 1956–1970

Pavel Borisovich Luspekayev (Russian: Па́вел Бори́сович Луспека́ев;с20 April 1927, Luhansk — 17 April 1970, Moscow) was a Soviet actor who is best known for his role of Vereschagin in the classic Russian movie White Sun of the Desert. Laureate of the State Prize of the Russian Federation (1997, posthumously).

== Biography ==
Pavel Luspekayev was born in Luhansk, Ukrainian SSR in 1927. His father Bogdasar Luspekyan was an Armenian butcher from a village near Nakhichevan-on-Don (Russian city founded by Armenian settlers). His mother Seraphima Kovaleva came from Don Cossacks. During the World War II he joined the Soviet partisans at the age of 16 and fought shortly after with the 3rd Ukrainian Front. When his feet suffered severe frostbite, he had to be demobilised in 1944. Luspekayev's lower limbs never fully recovered.

In 1945 Luspekayev became student in the Mikhail Shchepkin Higher Theatre School in Moscow. After finishing the school in 1950 he performed in Tbilisi's Griboedov Russian Drama Theatre, in 1956 in Kiev's Lesya Ukrainka National Academic Theater of Russian Drama. In 1959 he joined Leningrad's Bolshoi Drama Theatre where he performed in plays under director Georgy Tovstonogov. In 1965 Luspekayev was awarded the title of Meritorious Artist (Zasluzhenny aktyor) of RSFSR.

The long-term effects of the suffered frostbite caused a peripheral vascular disease in Luspekayev's legs when he was 26. The illness progressed, and after he finished the movie The Republic of ShKID (1966) both of his legs had to be amputated just below the knees.

Nevertheless, he continued to perform on prosthesis, even though he was suffering from pain. During filming of White Sun of the Desert in 1969, Luspekayev's condition worsened, and he could barely walk. His wife was carrying a small folding chair, and Luspekayev had to take a rest every 20 steps. In the original script, the role of Vereschagin was a minor one, but during filming, the role began to expand, with some of the scenes being improvised on the spot. The connection between the actor and the role he was playing became so strong, that the crew began to call Vereschagin by name Pavel (Pasha), even though in the script his name was Alexander.

Shortly after the White Sun of the Desert was released, Pavel Luspekayev died from a heart aneurysm. He was buried in the Northern Cemetery of Saint Petersburg.

== Personal life ==
He was married to the BDT actress Inna Kirillova. They had one daughter and two grandchildren.

== Filmography ==
Year	Title	Role	Notes
1954	They Descended from the Mountains	Boris	
1957	The Secret of Two Oceans	Kartsev	
1959	Blue Arrow	Chief of Staff	
1960	Ezop	Agnostos	TV Movie
1961	Kochvatz en aprelu	Vazgen Aramyan	
1961	Baltic Sky	Kuznetsov	
1963	Nylon Nets	Stepan	
1965	Mercy Train	Lutokhin	
1965	The Salvos of the Aurora Cruiser	fat officer	
1965	On the Same Planet	Nikolai Markin	
1966	Going Inside a Storm	Aleksei Ivanovich Denisov	
1966	A Long Happy Life	Pavel	
1966	Three Fat Men	Gen. Karaska	
1966	The Republic of ShKID	Kostalmed	
1967	On the Wild Shore	Gladyshev	
1967	An Incident That No One Noticed	Teterin	
1969	Castling to the Long Side	Rebrov	
1969	Tomorrow, on April 3rd...		
1969	Her name is Spring	teacher	
1970	White Sun of the Desert	Pavel Vereshchagin	
1970	Green Chains	Ivan Vasilyevich	
1972	Such a Long, Long Road...	Ivan Artamonov	(final film role)
