= Misha Glenny =

English journalist and broadcaster (1958)

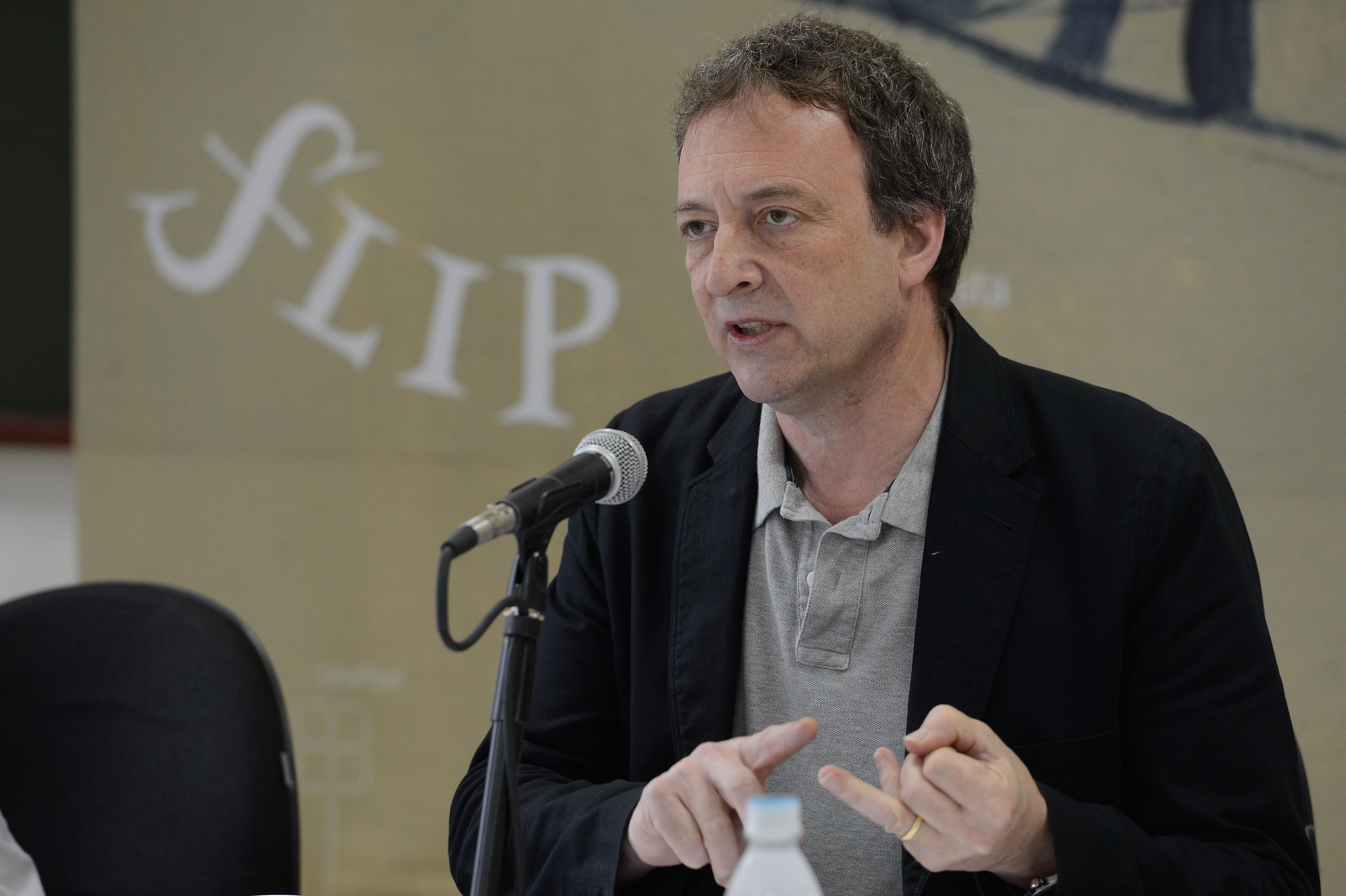
- Glenny in 2016
- Born: 25 April 1958 (age 68)
- Education: Magdalen College School, Oxford; University of Bristol; Charles University, Prague
- Occupations: Journalist and broadcaster
- Spouse: Kirsty Lang
- Children: 3

Michael V. E. "Misha" Glenny (born 25 April 1958) is an English journalist and broadcaster, specialising in southeast Europe, global organised crime, and cybersecurity. He was Rector of the Institute for Human Sciences (IWM, Institut für die Wissenschaften vom Menschen) in Vienna between 2022 and 2026. In January 2026, he replaced Melvyn Bragg as the host of BBC Radio 4's history of ideas programme In Our Time.

== Early life and education ==
Glenny was born in Kensington, London, the son of Juliet Mary Crum and Michael Glenny, a Russian studies academic and translator. His parents separated when he was 13. Glenny has described his ancestry as "three-quarters Anglo-Celtic and a quarter Jewish". He has also said "My family is entirely Celtic ... my ancestors come from Dublin, Newry, Stirling, Glasgow and Argyll.

His parents moved from London to Oxford, where he was educated at Magdalen College School. He studied drama and German at the University of Bristol before attending Prague's Charles University. He is multilingual, speaking English, German, Serbo-Croat, Czech and Portuguese.

== Career ==
He became Central Europe correspondent for The Guardian and later the BBC. He specialised in reporting on the Yugoslav Wars in the early 1990s that followed the breakup of Yugoslavia. While at the BBC, Glenny won a Sony special award in 1993's Radio Academy Awards for his "outstanding contribution to broadcasting". In McMafia (2008), he wrote that international organised crime could account for 15% of the world's GDP. Glenny advised the US and some European governments on policy issues and for three years ran an NGO helping with the reconstruction of Serbia, Macedonia and Kosovo. Glenny appeared in the documentary film, Raw Opium: Pain, Pleasure, Profits (2011).

Glenny's later books continue an interest in international crime. DarkMarket (2011) concerns cybercrime and the activities of hackers involved in phishing and other activities. Nemesis: One Man and the Battle for Rio (2015) about the leading Brazilian drug trafficker Antônio Francisco Bonfim Lopes (known as "Nem") in Rocinha, a Rio de Janeiro favela (slum).

From January 2012, Glenny was visiting professor at Columbia University's Harriman Institute, teaching a course on "crime in transition". In an interview in October 2011, he also spoke about his book, DarkMarket; assessing cybercriminals with Simon Baron-Cohen at Cambridge; the Stuxnet cyberattack which resulted in "gloves off" attention from governments; and other more recent cyberattacks.

Glenny was an executive producer of the BBC One eight-part drama series, McMafia, inspired by his non-fiction book of the same name (2008).

Glenny is a producer and the writer of the BBC Radio 4 series, How to Invent a Country, also made available as a podcast. An audio book of the same name was published by Penguin Random House in January 2021, consisting of the series' first 28 episodes broadcast October 2011–March 2019.

In 2019, Glenny presented a podcast on the life of Vladimir Putin titled Putin: Prisoner of Power.

In 2022, Glenny presented a five-part series, The Scramble for Rare Earths, on BBC Radio 4. In the programmes he says, “In this series I’m finding out why the battle for a small group of metals and critical raw materials is central to rising geopolitical tensions around the world.”

From May 2022 until March 2026, Glenny was Rector of the Institute of Human Sciences in Vienna.

== Personal life ==
Glenny is married to English journalist and broadcaster Kirsty Lang and has three children: two with his first wife (a son and a daughter, Sasha, who died by suicide in 2014 at age 22) and a son with Lang. He lives in Shepherd's Bush, west London.

== Publications ==
- The Rebirth of History: Eastern Europe in the Age of Democracy (1991) ISBN 978-0-14014-394-2
- The Fall of Yugoslavia: The Third Balkan War (1992; revised in 1996) ISBN 978-0-14025-771-7
- The Balkans: Nationalism, War and the Great Powers, 1804–1999 (1999; revised 2012) ISBN 978-1-77089-273-6
- McMafia: A Journey Through the Global Criminal Underworld (2008) ISBN 978-0-09948-125-6
- DarkMarket: Cyberthieves, Cybercops and You (2011) ISBN 978-0307592934
- Nemesis: One Man and the Battle for Rio (2015) ISBN 978-0-09958-465-0

== See also ==
- True crime
