= McMafia: A Journey Through the Global Criminal Underworld =

2008 book by Misha Glenny

- Author: Misha Glenny
- Language: English
- Publication date: 2008

McMafia: A Journey Through the Global Criminal Underworld is a nonfiction book written by Misha Glenny and published in 2008 by Random House. Glenny is a former correspondent for the BBC World Service who covered Central Europe.

The book provided the evidential basis for the (fictional) 2018 TV series, McMafia.

== Summary ==
According to the book, the collapse of the Soviet Union was the catalyst for organized crime to proliferate in Eastern Europe. Glenny supplies first hand descriptions, and chronicles a multinational journey of organized transnational crime in the age of the deregulated globalized market place. For sources, Glenny conducted hundreds of interviews with mainstream business people, as well as former and existent law enforcement and government officials.
