= Kalina krasnaya =

Russian expression describing a plant

Kalina krasnaya is a Russian expression which describes the Viburnum opulus (Russian: Калина кра́сная, romanized: Kalina krasnaya, or Кали́на обыкнове́нная, Kalina obyknovennaya).

The term kalina describes the berry and krasnaya the color red. Viburnum opulus (kalina) is an important element of the Russian folk culture. Kalina derived in Russian language from kalit' or raskalyat', which means "to make red-hot". In Old Russian language the word for beautiful and red were completely identical. In the modern Russian language, the terms for red and beautiful are still strongly connected linguistically. Krasnaya (Russian: кра́сная) means red and is connected in modern Russian language to beautiful (Russian: красиво).

The expression kalina krasnaya which means red viburnum is a symbol for love, beauty, youth, luck and passion and feelings people seek to feel. It represents one side of the Mother Rusĭ. A kalina berry can also symbolize a transition to the opposite, emotions and emotional worlds that feel painful for people, like sadness and grief (Горькая Калина, gor'kaya kalina).

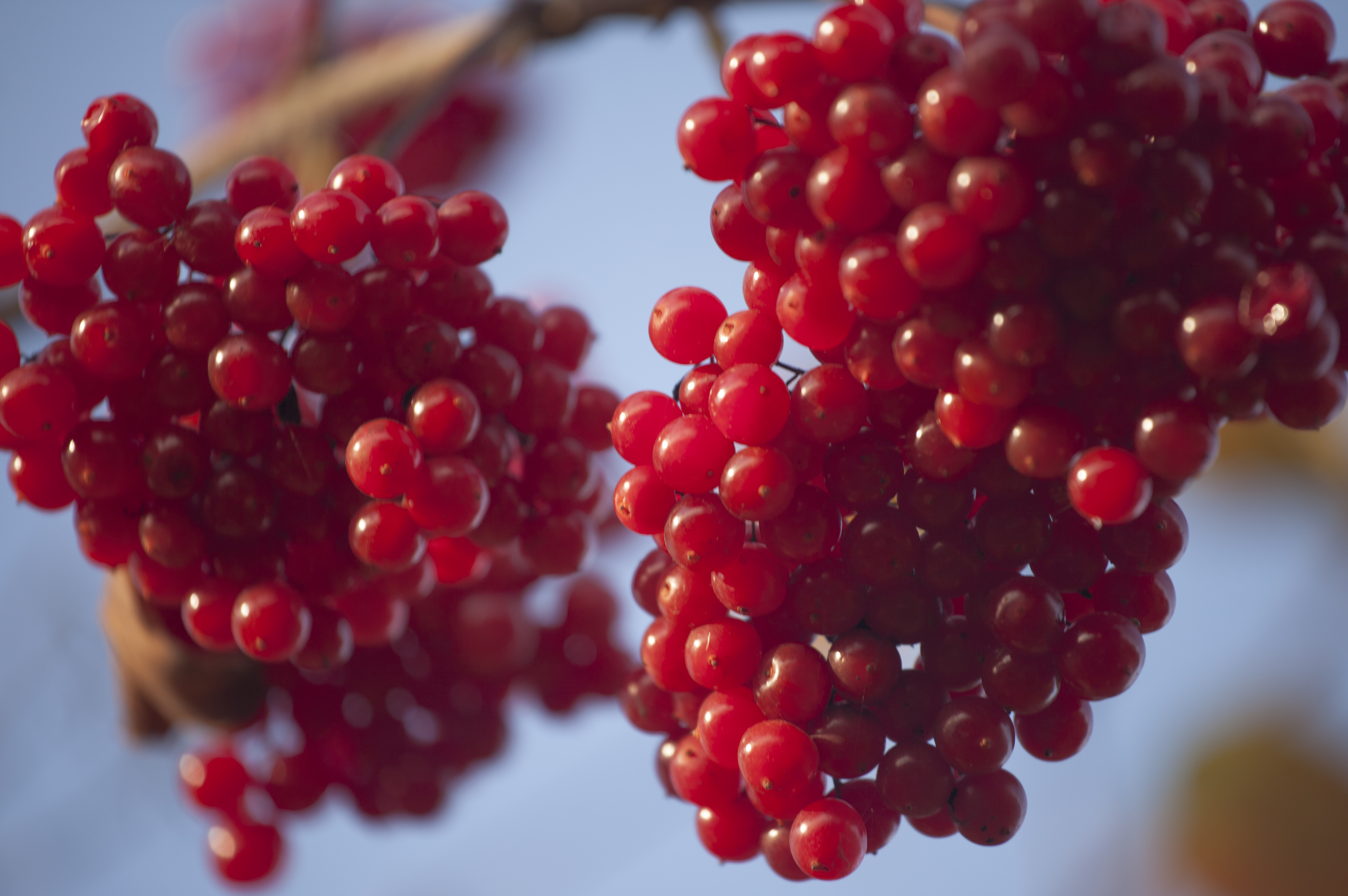
Kalina krasnaya, which describes the Viburnum opulus, is associated in Russian culture with human feelings and emotions

In Russian folklore, Kalina Krasnaya is the subject of many songs and poems, such as "Kalinka" from 1860.

== See also ==
- The Red Snowball Tree
