= If War Comes Tomorrow =

- Russian: Если завтра война...
- Directed by: Yefim Dzigan; Lazar Antsi-Polovsky; Georgy Beryozko; Nikolai Karmazinsky
- Written by: Yefim Dzigan; Mikhail Svetlov; Georgy Beryozko
- Starring: Inna Fyodorova; Vsevolod Sanayev
- Music by: Dmitry Pokrass; Daniil Pokrass
- Release date: 1938
- Running time: 66 min.
- Country: Soviet Union
- Language: Russian

If War Comes Tomorrow (Russian: Если завтра война...) is a 1938 Soviet war drama and propaganda film directed by Lazar Antsi-Polovsky, Georgy Beryozko, Yefim Dzigan and Nikolai Karmazinsky.

The film tells about the readiness of the Red Army to defend the Soviet Union in the event of an enemy attack.

== Plot ==
The fascists declare war. The entire Soviet people, young and old, rise to defend their socialist homeland. Volunteers are being recruited at workplaces, and millions of patriots rally under the battle banners. From distant Uzbekistan, sunny Georgia, the Kuban and the Don, the Terek and the Urals, from the fields of Ukraine, and the factories of Donbass, trains carrying heroic defenders of the Motherland head to the frontlines.

Marshal of the Soviet Union, Comrade Voroshilov, arrives at the forward positions and delivers a speech that resonates in the hearts of every soldier. The order is given: break through the enemy front and defeat them on their own territory. A decisive battle begins. Tanks overcome fascist defenses and crush their artillery. Soviet air forces penetrate deep into enemy lines, deploying parachute troops. The paratroopers block the path of enemy reinforcements.

With shouts of "For the Soviet Motherland!" and a powerful "Hurrah!" the Soviet soldiers charge into attack.

== Cast ==
- Inna Fyodorova as commander's wife
- Vsevolod Sanayev as soldier (uncredited)
- Serafim Kozminsky as air brigade commander
