= The Heirs (2008 film) =

- Russian: Наследники
- Directed by: Konstantin Odegov
- Written by: Konstantin Odegov
- Produced by: Konstantin Odegov
- Starring: Aleksandr Bashirov; Yuliya Galkina; Aleksandr Golubkov; Denis Karasyov; Leonid Kuravlyov
- Cinematography: Radik Askarov
- Music by: Aleksey Rybnikov
- Release date: 2008
- Country: Russia
- Language: Russian

The Heirs (Russian: Наследники) is a 2008 Russian drama film directed by Konstantin Odegov.

== Plot ==
The plot focuses on an ordinary family living in one village in the taiga. Father works as a driller and mother as a nurse. It would seem that everything is fine with them, but suddenly father begins to drink and draws his wife into it, leaving his son without supervision.

== Cast ==
- Aleksandr Bashirov
- Yuliya Galkina
- Aleksandr Golubkov
- Denis Karasyov
- Leonid Kuravlyov
- Yekaterina Rednikova
- Vladimir Tolokonnikov
- Pavel Yurchenko
- Amadu Mamadakov
