= Copper Angel =

- Directed by: Veniamyn Dorman
- Written by: Isay Kuznetsov
- Starring: Anatoly Kuznetsov; Irina Shevchuk; Aleksandr Filippenko; Leonid Kuravlyov; Leonid Yarmolnik; Valentin Smirnitsky; Nikolai Yeremenko Jr.; Liya Akhedzhakova; Alim Kouliev
- Cinematography: Vadim Korniliev
- Music by: Mikael Tariverdiev
- Production company: Gorky Film Studios
- Release date: 1984
- Running time: 89 min.
- Country: Soviet Union
- Language: Russian

Copper Angel (Russian: Медный ангел, romanized: Medny angel) is a 1984 Soviet action film directed by Veniamyn Dorman and starring Anatoly Kuznetsov, Leonid Kuravlyov and Aleksandr Filippenko.

== Plot ==
The international geological expedition headed by Soviet engineer Kurmaev (Anatoly Kuznetsov), is doing research with the purpose of construction of hydroelectric power station in a remote mountain area of a Latin American country. Hotel Copper Angel forms the base of the expedition, a refuge for the brothers Valdes gang who are selling illegal drugs and a target for the reactionary organization.

== Cast ==
- Anatoly Kuznetsov as Kurmayev
- Irina Shevchuk as Marina Gromova, geologist
- Valentin Smirnitsky as Vladislav
- Leonid Yarmolnik as Maurice Barro
- Leonid Kuravlyov as Larsen
- Aleksandr Filippenko as Santiliano
- Archil Gomiashvili as Antonio Valdéz
- Nikolai Yeremenko Jr. as Sebastien Valdez
- Alim Kouliev as Jose Kodrero
- Liya Akhedzhakova as Rosita
- Rostislav Yankovsky as Levon, politician
- Vadim Zakharchenko as Max
- Alexander Yakovlev as Vaqueros
