= Simply Awful! =

- Directed by: Aleksandr Polynnikov
- Written by: Yaroslav Kharechko
- Starring: Dima Zamulin; Semyon Morozov; Anna Tolstaya
- Cinematography: Arkady Povzner
- Music by: Bogdan Trotskuk
- Production company: Odessa Film Studio
- Release date: 1982
- Running time: 110 minutes
- Country: Soviet Union
- Language: Russian

Simply Awful! (Russian: Просто ужас!, romanized: Prosto uzhas!) is a 1982 Soviet fantasy comedy film directed by Aleksandr Polynnikov based on the play of the same name by Yuri Sotnik. It is the second adaptation of the play, the first one was Two Days of Miracles in 1970.

== Plot ==
The film tells about the adventures of sixth grader Anton Murashov and his father, who are both convinced that it would be very easy to be a completely different person and do other tasks, perhaps even easier than being yourself. Father of Anton's friend invents the "Wish-fulfiller" and with the help of this machine Anton and Vadim Petrovich exchange places — Anton becomes a veterinarian, and his veterinarian father, a schoolboy.

== Cast ==
- Dima Zamulin — Anton Murashov
- Semyon Morozov — Vadim Petrovich
- Anna Tolstaya — Alenka
- Galina Venevitinova — Marousia
- Alla Budnitskaya — Varvara Ivanovna
- Leonid Kuravlyov — Ruslan Ivanovich
- Elizaveta Nikishchihina — Anna Borisovna
- Yevgeniya Khanayeva — Antonina Georgievna
- Aleksandr Shirvindt — Chief Physician
- Lidia Ezhevskaya — Louise Vasilievna
- Natalya Krachkovskaya — Raisa Nikolaevna
- Sergey Golubkov — Serezha
- Natalya Seleznyova — girl with a wrench
- Liliya Gritsenko — teacher of geography
- Herman Kachin — Leonid Nikolaevich
- Vladimir Yumatov — friend of Murashov Sr.
- Tamara Yarenko — teacher
- Alexander Glovyak — artist
- Natalya Kustinskaya — cat lady
- Vladimir Naumtsev — teacher of mathematics
- Elena Fetisenko — landlady
- Georgiy Georgiou — neighbor of the Murashovs
- Alexander Vasyushkin — cameo
- Yevgeny Morgunov — owner of the goat
- Valery Nosik — hunter
