= There Is Such a Lad =

- Directed by: Vasily Shukshin
- Written by: Vasily Shukshin
- Starring: Leonid Kuravlyov; Lidiya Chaschina; Larisa Burkova; Renita Grigoryeva; Nina Sazonova
- Cinematography: Valeri Ginzburg
- Music by: Pavel Chekalov
- Production company: Gorky Film Studio
- Release date: 1964
- Running time: 101 minutes
- Country: Soviet Union
- Language: Russian

There Is Such a Lad (Russian: Живёт такой парень, romanized: Zhivyot takoy paren) is a 1964 Soviet romantic comedy film, directed by Vasily Shukshin. The movie is based on Vasily Shukshin's collection of short stories.

The movie tells the story of an Altai truck driver Pashka Kolokolnikov (played by Leonid Kuravlyov) - a kind, funny, and outgoing person, who loves life. He is a simpleton with a variety of gross provincial expressions and remarks, who likes to make fun of people and play practical jokes. But it turns out that he can also be a hero, when he prevents the explosion of a gasoline truck by risking his life.

== Plot ==
The film follows Pashka Kolokolnikov, nicknamed "Piramidon," a young, optimistic, and somewhat naïve truck driver navigating the Chuisky Tract near Gorno-Altaysk. Open-hearted and curious about life, Pashka encounters various people on his journeys, each shaping his experiences. One day, he meets a kolkhoz chairman who hires him to transport timber. During this assignment, Pashka meets Nastya, a reserved librarian, and begins courting her. Despite his efforts, Nastya remains indifferent, preferring her suitor Gena. After an awkward confrontation, Pashka accepts her rejection and even encourages Gena to reconcile with her, reflecting on his own unlucky love life.

In another episode, Pashka picks up a city woman who discusses household culture. Initially refusing her payment, he becomes offended by her husband's dismissive remark and demands an exaggerated fare. Later, he visits his old acquaintance, Katya, hoping to reignite their friendship, but she rejects his advances, leading to an argument about modern relationships. That night, Pashka hears a story from his landlady about a driver who encountered a spectral woman in white—a personification of Death. This tale haunts Pashka, and he dreams of Nastya as the mysterious figure, blending his romantic longing with existential fears.

During a routine trip with his colleague Kondrat Stepanovich, Pashka plays matchmaker, introducing him to a widow named Anisya, leading to a budding romance. Pashka’s life takes a dramatic turn when a fire breaks out at a fuel depot. While others flee, Pashka heroically drives the burning truck off the premises, preventing an explosion but sustaining injuries. In the hospital, a journalist from Leningrad interviews him, sparking a playful connection. He also has a heartfelt conversation with a retired teacher, who urges him to pursue knowledge and find joy in simplicity. The film ends with Pashka dreaming of Nastya again, but this time she appears as Love rather than Death, inspiring him to persevere and seek fulfillment in life.

== Awards ==
The film won the Lion of Saint Marco prize at the Venice Film Festival in 1964 for Best Children's Film and received an award at the All-Union Film Festival (Leningrad, 1964) for Best Comedy Film ("For the cheerfulness, lyricism and originality").

== Cast ==
- Leonid Kuravlyov as Pashka Kolokolnikov
- Lidiya Chaschina as Nastya Platonova
- Larisa Burkova as Katya Lizunova
- Renita Grigoryeva as a city woman
- Nina Sazonova as Anisya
- Anastasia Zuyeva as Marfa
- Bella Akhmadulina as journalist
- Boris Balakin as Kondrat Stepanovich
- Rodion Nakhapetov as Gena
- Viktor Filippov as collective farm chairman
- Ivan Ryzhov as Head tank farms
- Nikolai Fedortsov as Pasha friend
- Yevgeniy Teterin as teacher
- Natalia Gitserot as Leading fashion show
- Yuri Grigoryev as Oleg
- Elena Volskaya as nurse
- Nina Ivanova as Nina

== Production ==
During filming Boris Balakin continued working despite suffering from fever. After finishing a scene with Nina Sazonova the crew went on lunch break, while Balakin rested on his chair in the décor. Trying to get up, he died of a heart attack. In order to keep Balakins' part in the film, director Shukshin rewrote his screenplay to remove Balakin's one unfilmed scene.
