= The Beloved (1940 film) =

1940 film

- Russian: Любимая девушка
- Directed by: Ivan Pyryev
- Written by: Pavel Nilin
- Starring: Marina Ladynina; Vsevolod Sanaev; Leonid Kmit; Aleksandr Zrazhevsky; Mariya Yarotskaya
- Cinematography: Valentin Pavlov
- Music by: Lev Shvarts
- Release date: 1940
- Running time: 83 minute
- Country: Soviet Union
- Language: Russian

The Beloved (Russian: Любимая девушка) is a 1940 Soviet romantic drama film directed by Ivan Pyryev.

== Plot ==
Successful turner-multiplayer of one car factory Vasily, having received a new home, tries to persuade his girlfriend to move to him. It would seem all right, but on the first day of their life together they quarrel, as a result of which Varya returns to her home. Soon she has a baby. Her family does everything possible to reconcile the couple.

== Starring ==
- Marina Ladynina as Varya Lugina
- Vsevolod Sanaev as Vasiliy Dobryakov
- Leonid Kmit as Viktor Simakov
- Aleksandr Zrazhevsky as Semyon Dementevich
- Mariya Yarotskaya as Evdikiya Petrovna
- Faina Ranevskaya as Marya Ivanovna
- Ivan Lobyzovskiy as Kostya Zaytsev (as I. Lobyzovskiy)
- Nikolai Nikitich as Judge
- Sergei Antimonov as Doorman in Maternity Home (uncredited)
- Pyotr Glebov as Spectator in the stands (uncredited)
