= The Salvos of the Aurora Cruiser =

- Russian: Залп «Авроры»
- Directed by: Yuri Vyshinsky
- Written by: Yuri Vyshinsky; Boris Lavrenyev
- Starring: Sergey Boyarskiy; Zinaida Kirienko; Mikhail Kuznetsov; Pavel Luspekayev; Mikhail Yekaterininsky
- Cinematography: Anatoli Nazarov
- Music by: Vasiliy Solovev-Sedoy
- Release date: 1965
- Country: Soviet Union
- Language: Russian

The Salvos of the Aurora Cruiser (Russian: Залп «Авроры») is a 1965 Soviet historical drama film directed by Yuri Vyshinsky.

== Plot ==
The film takes place in Petrograd in October 1917. Lenin is going to organize an armed uprising, while Zinoviev is against it. Most members of the Central Committee support Lenin. The Russian Provisional Government sends its troops to the Winter Palace, and the commander of the cruiser Aurora receives an order to go to sea.

== Cast ==
- Sergey Boyarskiy
- Zinaida Kirienko
- Mikhail Kuznetsov
- Pavel Luspekayev
- Mikhail Yekaterininsky
