= Happy Go Lucky (1972 film) =

- Directed by: Vasily Shukshin
- Written by: Vasily Shukshin
- Produced by: Yakov Zvonkov
- Starring: Vasily Shukshin; Lidiya Fedoseyeva-Shukshina; Vsevolod Sanayev; Georgi Burkov; Zinovy Gerdt
- Cinematography: Anatoly Zabolotsky
- Music by: Pavel Chekalov
- Release date: 2 April 1972
- Running time: 90 min
- Country: Soviet Union
- Language: Russian

Happy Go Lucky (Russian: Печки-лавочки, romanized: Pechki-lavochki, literally Stoves and benches — ironic regional saying that may mean Various subjects for casual conversations or/and Distracting lies depending on the certain context) is a 1972 Soviet comedy film directed by Vasily Shukshin.

== Plot ==
Story about a travel of married couple from a far-off village in the Altai Mountains to the southern sea. For the first time in life spouses go to the holiday according to the trade-union committee permit moreover in a separate coupe. Road adventures and a rhythm of new life carry them away, but among beauty of the southern nature they can't forget about native places and close people who wait for their return.

== Cast ==
- Vasily Shukshin as Ivan Rastorguyev
- Lidiya Fedoseyeva-Shukshina as Nyura Rastorgueva
- Vsevolod Sanayev as Professor
- Georgi Burkov as Viktor, fake сonstructor, thief
- Zinovy Gerdt as 2nd professor
- Ivan Ryzhov as Train steward
- Stanislav Lyubshin as Ivan Stepanov
- Vadim Zakharchenko as Business traveller

== Facts ==
- A significant part of the shooting took place in the village of Shulgin Log on the bank of the Katun River. All the shooting took four months.
- The role of Ivan Sergeevich Rastorguev was proposed to Leonid Kuravlyov, but he refused it.
