= Tree Sticks! =

- Russian: Ёлки-палки!
- Directed by: Sergey Nikonenko
- Written by: Sergey Nikonenko; Vasiliy Shukshin
- Starring: Sergey Nikonenko; Ekaterina Voronina; Galina Polskikh; Leonid Kuravlyov; Yevgeny Yevstigneyev
- Cinematography: Nikolai Puchkov
- Release date: 1988
- Country: Soviet Union
- Language: Russian

Tree Sticks! (Russian: Ёлки-палки!) is a 1988 Soviet comedy film directed by Sergey Nikonenko.

== Plot ==
The film tells of an unusual and stubborn man who tries to create a perpetual motion machine and write a philosophical treatise, but feels very unhappy.

== Cast ==
- Sergey Nikonenko
- Ekaterina Voronina
- Galina Polskikh
- Leonid Kuravlyov
- Yevgeny Yevstigneyev
