= Vadim Zakharchenko =

Soviet and Russian actor (1929–2007)

- Born: 19 February 1929; Novosibirsk, Russian SFSR, Soviet Union
- Died: 2 January 2007 (aged 77); Moscow, Russia
- Occupation: Actor
- Years active: 1953—1999

Vadim Viktorovich Zakharchenko (Russian: Вадим Викторович Захарченко; 19 February 1929 — 2 January 2007) was a Soviet and Russian actor. He appeared in more than one hundred films from 1954 to 2002. Honored Artist of the Russian Federation (1993).

== Selected filmography ==
Year	Title	Role	Notes
1956	The Forty-First (Сорок первый)	Lieutenant Kuchkovskiy	
1958	And Quiet Flows the Don (Тихий Дон)	Prokhor Zykov	
1965	Your Son and Brother (Ваш сын и брат)	doctor	
1965	Come Here, Mukhtar! (Ко мне, Мухтар!)	investigator	
1967	Viy (Вий)	Khalyava	
1972	Happy Go Lucky (Печки-лавочки)	business traveller	
1979	The Garage (Гараж)	a shareholder with glasses	
1980	Could One Imagine? (Вам и не снилось...)	episode (not titles)	
1984	Copper Angel (Медный ангел)	Max	
1985	One Second for a Feat (Секунда на подвиг)	Chief Physician	
1987	Visit to Minotaur (Визит к Минотавру)	store manager	
1993	My Family Treasure (Сокровище моей семьи)	Vessily	
1995	The Aristocratic Peasant Girl (Барышня-крестьянка)	servant	
