= Maria Shukshina =

Russian actress (born 1967)

- Мария Шукшина
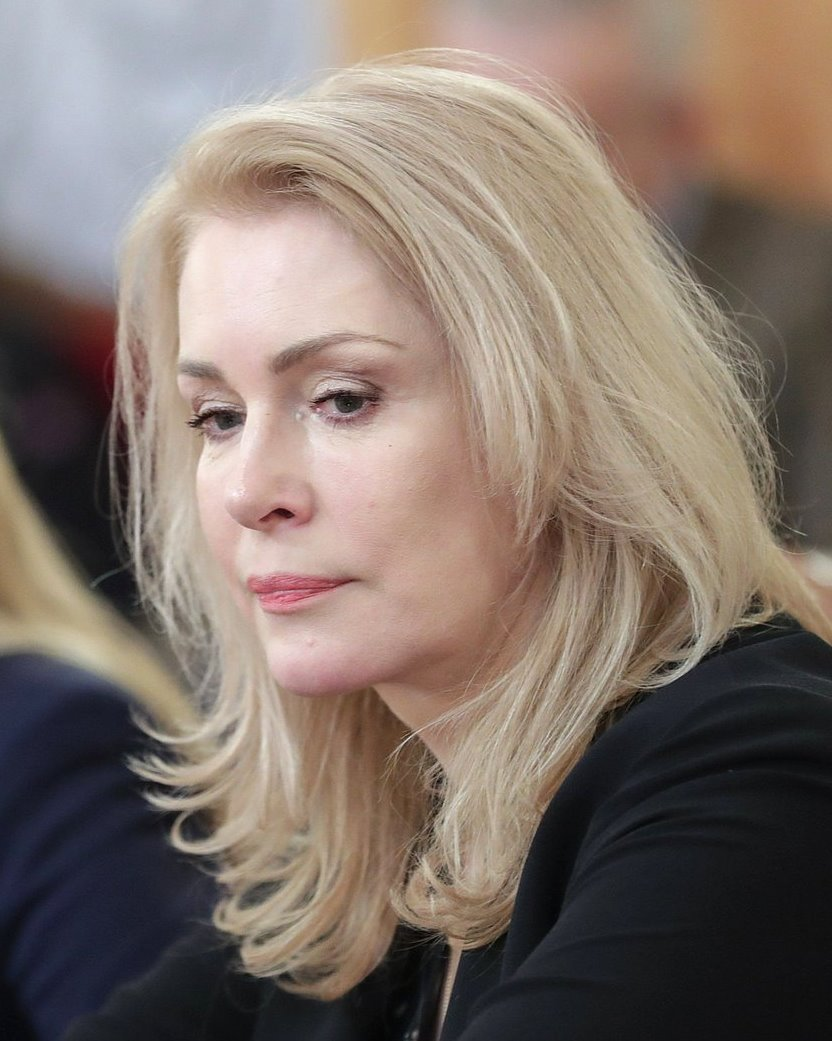
- Shukshina in 2023
- Born: 27 May 1967 (age 59); Moscow, Russian SFSR, Soviet Union
- Education: Institute of Foreign Languages
- Occupations: Actress; television; translator (formerly)
- Years active: 1969–present
- Children: 4
- Awards: Nika Award - 2009

Maria Vasilievna Shukshina (Russian: Мария Васильевна Шукшина; born 27 May 1967) is a Russian actress. Her film credits include Burnt by the Sun 2: Exodus (2010), Bury Me Behind the Baseboard (2009) and American Daughter (1995). Her television credits include Dear Masha Berezina (2004), Take me with You (2008) and McMafia (2018). She hosted the show Wait for Me on Channel One Russia and was a member of the judging panel on Minute of Fame.

== Biography ==
=== Early life and education ===
Maria Shukshina was born in Moscow, the daughter of Russian writer, film director and actor Vasily Shukshin and Russian film actress Lidiya Fedoseyeva-Shukshina. The actress has an older half-sister Anastasia, and younger sister Olga.

She graduated from the translation department of Moscow's Institute of Foreign Languages. After the institute she worked as an interpreter and broker on the Russian commodity exchange.

=== Film and television career ===
In 1969, at the age of one and a half years, Shukshina starred in the segment "Brother" in the anthology film of Vasily Shukshin Strange people. And at the age of five Masha, together with her sister Olga, played the daughters of the Rastorguev family in the film Happy Go Lucky.

Two years later, the actress appeared again on the screen. She played the role of Vishnyak's daughter in the film directed by Sergei Nikonenko Birds over the City.

In the mid-1990s, Maria Shukshina starred in several popular films. In Karen Shakhnazarov's film American Daughter (1995), the actress played a practical and unsentimental businesswoman, who flees from her husband along with her young daughter to America. In the same year Shukshina played a similar role in the film What a Wonderful Game by Pyotr Todorovsky where Maria appeared as a beautiful student who, without hesitation, hands over her classmates to state security agencies.

In the early 2000s in Alla Surikova's comedy television series Perfect Couple the actress played a brief role of a journalist who interviews Armen Dzhigarkhanyan.

Maria had a lead role in Vsevolod Shilovsky's television series People and Shadows: The Secrets of the Puppet Theater (2001).

In the 2004 television series Dear Masha Berezina played Katya, who independently tries to make a career in the modeling business.

In the serial film Brezhnev, the actress appears as Nina Korovyakova, the last romantic interest of Leonid Brezhnev, a woman who had a certain influence on the omnipotent general secretary.

In the popular melodramatic series Take me with you (2008) Maria played the main role - Maria Karetnikova, a rich woman, disillusioned with her life of luxury.

The actress played the character of Polina Ivanova in the melodrama of Vlad Furman Terrorist Ivanova. In the film the son of Polina Ivanova becomes a cripple through the fault of an influential businessman, and her husband dies in jail. The woman decides to take revenge.

In the drama Bury Me Behind the Baseboard, shot by director Sergei Snezhkin based on the self-titled autobiographical novel by Pavel Sanayev, Shukshina played the role of Olga, the weak-willed mother of the main hero Sasha.

The actress featured in Burnt by the Sun 2: Exodus, Deli Case No. 1, Made in the USSR, The Fire-place Guest, Who, If not I?, Stanitsa, Yolki 3, Good-bye, boys, Mannequin, Outgoing nature, Husband on call, His own stranger, Yolki 5, Such work.

In 2018 she played Oksana Godman, mother of the protagonist Alex Godman, in the BBC crime drama McMafia.

=== Television host ===
From 1999 to 2014, Maria Shukshina hosted the program Wait for Me on Channel One. She a member of the judging panel on the fifth season of Minute of Fame. In 2018 she is to host the talk show A Visit in the Morning.

== Controversies ==
During the COVID-19 pandemic in Russia, Shukshina became an anti-vaccination activist, stating that the existing vaccines have not been sufficiently tested and should not be used. Instagram restricted following her account, displaying the warning that the account posted false information on a regular basis.

In 2022, she supported Russia's invasion of Ukraine. On 8 July 2022, the Meshchansky District Court of Moscow sentenced Alexei Gorinov, a lawyer and municipal councilor of the Krasnoselsky District, to seven years in prison. He was accused of disseminating "knowingly false information" about the Russian Armed Forces under the recently introduced Article 207.3 of the Criminal Code of the Russian Federation. His arrest and ensuing sentencing followed a statement he made about Russian aggression in Ukraine during a council meeting on 15 March 2022. The case was opened after a public denunciation by Shukshina who posted a video with a title: ""Here are the deputies we have! And not just anywhere, but right under the nose of the Kremlin." and two State Duma deputies said that they had written statements.

== Honors ==
In 2008, she received the honorary title of Meritorious Artist of Russia.

== Personal life ==
- First husband – Artyom Tregubenko (divorced).
  - Daughter – Anna Tregubenko (born 2 July 1988), studied at the Faculty of Producing at Gerasimov Institute of Cinematography.
    - Grandson – Vyacheslav (born 21 November 2014).
- Second husband – businessman Aleksey Kasatkin (divorced).
  - Son – Makar Kasatkin (born 20 November 1997).
    - Grandson – Mark (born 20 April 2018).
- Third husband – lawyer and businessman Boris Vishnyakov.
  - Twins son – Foma Vishnyakov and Foka Vishnyakov (born 31 July 2005).

== Filmography ==
Year	Title	Role	Notes
1969	Strange People	Masha	
1972	Happy Go Lucky	uncredited	
1974	Birds over the City	Masha Vishnyakova	
1990	The Eternal Husband		
1995	American Daughter	Yelena	
1995	What a Wonderful Game	Olya	
1998	The Circus Burned Down, and the Clowns Have Gone	Lena, second wife of Nikolai	
2001	A perfect match		TV series
2002	The Adventures of a magician	a hereditary witch Katerina	TV series
2004	My Big Armenian Wedding	Nadia	Mini-series
2004	Dear Masha Berezina	Katya (in the episodes)	TV series
2004	Narrow Bridge	Natasha, former wife of Vladimir	TV
2004	I love you	Alexandera	TV series
2005	Brezhnev	nurse	
2006-07	Pope of all trades	Yuliya Slavina	TV series
2007	Sac with a bright future	Katerina Koltsova	Mini-series
2008	Guilty Without Guilt	Taisa Ilinishna Shelavina	TV
2008	Take me with you	Margarita Karetnikova	TV series
2008	Indigo	Irina Sergeevna Ardashnikova	
2009	Terrorist Ivanova	Polina Ivanovna Ivanova	TV series
2009	Justice Volkov	Irina	
2009	Bury Me Behind the Baseboard	Olga, mother of Sasha Saveliev	
2009	Roof	Tatiana	
2009	Take me with you 2	Margarita Karetnikova	TV series
2010	Burnt by the Sun 2: Exodus	Zinaida	
2011	Made in the USSR	Tatiana Fertman	TV series
2011	Deli Case number 1	Zoya Platonova	TV series
2011	My Crazy Family!	Lidiya	
2012	Who, if not I?	Nina Berkutova	TV series
2012	Fireplace Guest	Eleanora, attorney	TV
2013	The Village	Marina Gorobets	TV series
2013	Yolki 3	Natasha	
2014	Mannequin	mum Vadim	Mini-series
2014	Outgoing Nature	Veronika	TV series
2014	Goodbye, boys!	Yevdokia Matveyevna, mother of Kolya	TV series
2015	It's Another	Alexandera Marinets, police lieutenant colonel	TV series
2016	Yolki 5	Natasha	
2018	McMafia	Oksana Godman	Television miniseries
2026	Seven Versts Before Dawn	Yefrosinya Shabanova	
