= The Red Snowball Tree =

- Original film poster
- Directed by: Vasily Shukshin
- Written by: Vasily Shukshin
- Starring: Vasily Shukshin; Lidiya Fedoseyeva-Shukshina; Georgi Burkov; Ivan Ryzhov; Maria Skvortsova
- Cinematography: Anatoli Zabolotsky
- Music by: Pavel Chekalov
- Production company: Mosfilm
- Release date: 1974
- Running time: 107 minutes
- Country: Soviet Union
- Language: Russian
- Budget: 289 000 rubles
- Box office: 140 million tickets

The Red Snowball Tree (Russian: Калина красная, romanized: Kalina krasnaya) is a 1974 Soviet drama film written and directed by Vasily Shukshin. It was the most successful film of that year. In total, the film sold an estimated 140 million tickets at the Soviet box office, making it the highest-grossing Soviet film of all time. German film director and screenwriter Rainer Werner Fassbinder included The Red Snowball Tree in the top ten of his favorite films.

== Plot ==
Yegor Prokudin (Vasili Shukshin), a recidivist thief nicknamed Gorye (Grief), completes his prison sentence and moves to a village to meet his pen pal Lyuba (Lidiya Fedoseyeva-Shukshina) who lives there. She is a stranger that wrote to him while he was in prison.

At first, Yegor plans to lay low for a while before returning to crime. Lyuba appears to genuinely love him, despite his criminal past and skepticism from her own friends and hostility from parents.

Yegor goes to town where he spends a lot of money drinking and dancing with strangers, and wires some money to his former associate. While he is away, Lyuba's friends try to convince her to get back together with her ex-husband, thinking that Yegor may start stealing again.

Yegor returns and settles in a village with Lyuba, and decides to break with the criminal past. The villagers get over their initial distrust of the ex-convict, and accept him into their community.

He drives with Lyuba to another village and asks her to impersonate a social worker to speak to an elderly woman living there. She talks about her tough life and says she has not seen her son for 18 years, while Yegor sits in another room wearing sunglasses. After the visit, Yegor tearfully admits it was his mother.

Lyuba's ex-husband and his friend visit Yegor and start a fight, but they retreat after seeing Yegor has no fear of them. Yegor starts a new job as a tractor driver in the field and enjoys being close to nature.

Yegor's former associate arrives to the village, asking him to return to town and giving him some money for travel expenses. Yegor throws the money in his face. Shortly after that, five criminals arrive to the village, shoot Yegor and escape.

Yegor dies in Lyuba's hands, while her brother Pyotr (Aleksei Vanin) chases them with his dump truck, crushing them and pushing their car into the river.

== Name ==
The name of the film refers to the snowball tree, otherwise known as the guelder-rose, a type of Viburnum.

== Production ==
The director has long nurtured plans to shoot a picture about Stepan Razin, but the State Committee for Cinematography put forward a condition to Shukshin - before he begins to work on a historical drama he must first direct a picture about the present. Shukshin then decided to adapt the story Kalina Krasnaya which he published in the magazine Nash Sovremennik.

Filming took place in Belozersk, Vologda Oblast, as well as in the surrounding villages - Sadovaya, Desyatovskaya and Krokhino. Local villagers took part in the episodic roles.

In November 1973, when the shooting was completed and Vasily Shukshin was busy with the editing, he suffered a severe attack of the peptic ulcer disease. The director was hospitalized but after staying in the hospital for a few days, he escaped from there and continued work on the film.

== Cast ==
- Vasili Shukshin as Yegor Prokudin, former burglar
- Lidiya Fedoseyeva-Shukshina as Lyuba Baykalova, Yegor's bride
- Ivan Ryzhov as Fedor Baykalov, Lyuba's father
- Maria Skvortsova as Lyuba's mother
- Aleksei Vanin as Pyotr Baykalov, Lyuba's brother
- Maria Vinogradova as Zoya, Pyotr's wife
- Euphemia Bystrova as Yegor's mother
- Zhanna Prokhorenko as inquisitor
- Lev Durov as Sergey Mikhailovich, ofitsiant
- Alexander Gorbenko as Kolya, former Lyuba's husband
- Nikolai Grabbe as chief of corrective labor colony
- Nikolay Pogodin as director of sovkhoz
- Georgi Burkov as Guboshlyop, criminal leader
- Tatyana Gavrilova as Lusyen, criminal girlfriend
- Artur Makarov as Buzya, criminal
- Oleg Korchikov as Shurka, criminal
- Natalya Gvozdikova as telegraph operator
- Iya Arepina as Yegor's sister

== Awards ==
- Polish Film Critics Award Warsaw siren for best foreign film in 1973, shown in Poland
- The main prize of the All-Union Film Festival in Baku (1974) "For an original, brilliant talent of the writer, director and actor"
- Readers of the magazine Soviet Screen picked it as best film of the year, and Shukshin as best actor.
- Shukshin posthumously received the Lenin Prize in 1976.
