= Liudmyla Alfimova =

Ukrainian actress (1935–2024)

- Людмила Алфімова
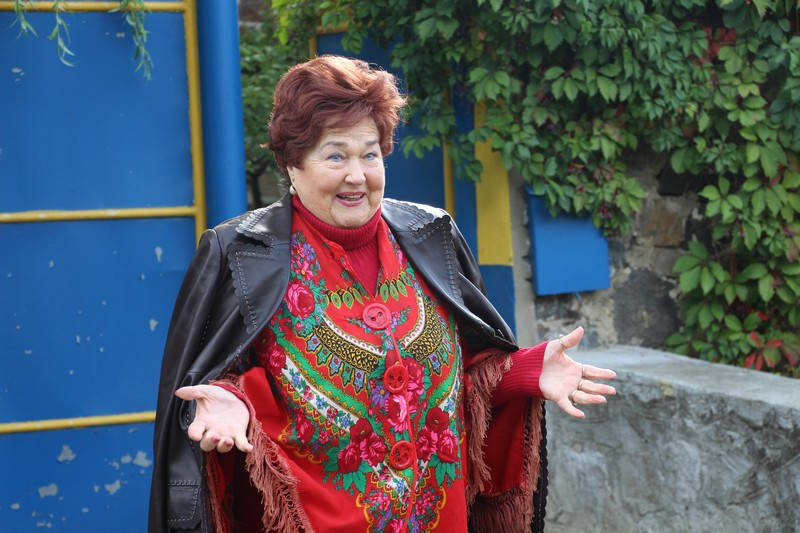
- Alfimova in 2020
- Born: Liudmyla Ivanivna Alfimova; 4 September 1935; Kharkiv, Ukrainian SSR, USSR
- Died: 22 February 2024 (aged 88); Pechera, Tulchyn Raion, Vinnytsia Oblast, Ukraine
- Education: Kharkiv Theatre Institute
- Occupation: Actress
- Years active: 1958–1992

Liudmyla Ivanivna Alfimova (Ukrainian: Людмила Іванівна Алфімова; 4 September 1935 – 22 February 2024) was a Ukrainian actress. She graduated from the Kharkiv Theatre Institute in 1958 and began working for Dovzhenko Film Studios.

== Filmography ==
- The Train Goes to Kiev (1958)
- Ordinary Story (1960)
- Chasing Two Hares (1961)
- The Heirs (1960)
- Our Honest Bread (1964)
- A Bag Full of Hearts (1964)
- Buryan (1967)
- Wedding in Malinovka (1967)
- Out of Boredom (1967)
- Between the High Crops (1970)
- Goodbye, Pharaohs! (1974)
- Yurka's Dawns (1974)
- The Right to Love (1977)
- The right to Manage (1981)
- Good Intentions (1984)
- Grooms (1986)
- Through Main Street with an Orchestra (1986)
- Now the Son of Man is Glorified (1990)
- Lord, Forgive Us, Sinners (1992)
