= Wedding in Malinovka =

- Directed by: Andrei Tutyshkin
- Written by: Leonid Yukhvid
- Produced by: Semyon Malkin
- Cinematography: Vyacheslav Fastovich
- Edited by: Mariya Pen
- Music by: Boris Aleksandrov
- Production company: Lenfilm
- Release date: 1967
- Running time: 95 minutes
- Country: Soviet Union
- Language: Russian
- Box office: 74.6 million tickets

Wedding in Malinovka (Russian: Свадьба в Малиновке, Svadba v Malinovke) is a 1967 Soviet musical comedy film directed by Andrei Tutyshkin. It is based on an operetta by Boris Aleksandrov adapted by Leonid Yukhvid.

The film is about a Ukrainian village during the time of the Russian Civil War. With power alternating almost daily between Soviet and nationalist forces, the villagers of Malinovka are never sure who is in charge, so they modify their behaviour and dress accordingly.

== Plot ==
The village of Malinovka, during the Russian Civil War, finds itself under constantly changing rulers. Despite the hardships of war, love blossoms between the shepherd Andreyka and Yarinka, the daughter of a revolutionary exiled to Siberia during the Tsarist era. Trouble arrives when a band led by the "ideological ataman" Gritsian Tavrichesky, a native of the village, seizes Malinovka. The ataman, intent on establishing his own "independent state," begins his reign with looting and violence. He becomes infatuated with Yarinka and attempts to force her into marriage through threats.

Frightened, Yarinka escapes into the forest, where she encounters a small detachment of Red Army cavalry, scouts sent by Grigory Kotovsky's forces. She pleads for their help, and the unit's commander, Nazar Duma, devises a plan to defeat the numerically superior bandits. For the plan to work, Yarinka must pretend to agree to marry the ataman. Meanwhile, the Red Army captures a White Army officer, Chechel, who had been sent to establish an alliance with Gritsian's band. Disguised as Chechel, Nazar Duma infiltrates the wedding. His strategy involves catching the bandits off guard while they are drunk, delivering grandiose toasts, charms the crowd with his refined manners, and discreetly disables the gang's machine guns.

As the time for the attack approaches, the signal is delayed. Gritsian grows suspicious of "Chechel" and pressures Yarinka, forcing Nazar to act alone. In a critical moment, reinforcements arrive, and the bandits are defeated. They are attacked from two sides: by Nazar's cavalry and by the women of Malinovka, led by Yashka the Artilleryman. The next morning, after this unconventional "wedding," Nazar Duma, who turns out to be Yarinka's father, gives his blessing to her union with Andreyka.

== Cast ==
- Vladimir Samoilov as Nazar Duma, Red squadron commander
- Liudmyla Alfimova as Sofya (vocal by Valentina Levko)
- Valentina Lysenko as Yarinka
- Yevgeni Lebedev as Nechipor
- Zoya Fyodorova as Gorpina Dormidontovna
- Heliy Sysoyev as Andreyka (vocal by Mikhail Egorov)
- Mikhail Pugovkin as Yashka the Gunner
- Nikolai Slichenko as Petrya
- Grigori Abrikosov as Grytsko Balyasny, or Pan-Ataman Gritsian Tavrichesky.
- Andrei Abrikosov as Balyasny Senior
- Mikhail Vodyanoy as Popandopulo
- Tamara Nosova as Komarikha
- Emma Treyvas as Tryndychikha
- Aleksei Smirnov as Smetana
- Margarita Krinitsyna as Redhead
- Aleksandr Orlov as priest
- Lyubov Tishchenko as peasant woman
- Boris Leskin as bandit
- Vyacheslav Voronin as Chechil

Dance scenes were cast with the participation of the Moldovan dance troupe Joc.

== Cultural influence ==
One of the film's main characters, Nazar Duma, has a completely unrelated namesake in a different famous Soviet film, Tractor Drivers (1939).
