= Adult Children =

1961 film

- Russian: Взрослые дети
- Directed by: Villen Azarov
- Written by: Valentina Spirina
- Starring: Aleksey Gribov; Zoya Fyodorova; Liliya Aleshnikova; Aleksandr Demyanenko; Vsevolod Sanaev
- Cinematography: Vladimir Mejbom; Sergei Zajtsev
- Edited by: Raisa Novikova
- Music by: Aleksandr Flyarkovsky
- Release date: 1961
- Running time: 76 minute
- Country: Soviet Union
- Language: Russian

Adult Children (Russian: Взрослые дети, romanized: Vzroslye deti) is a 1961 Soviet teen comedy-drama film directed by Villen Azarov.

== Plot ==
Anatoly Kuzmich Korolev (played by Alexey Gribov) retires and, together with his wife, Tatyana Ivanovna (Zoya Fyodorova), begins planning how to spend their newfound free time. Unexpectedly, their daughter, Lyudmila (Lilliana Alyoshnikova), brings home her husband, Igor (Alexander Demyanenko), without warning. When asked how they plan to live, the young couple initially say they will rent a room on the outskirts of Moscow. However, they eventually agree to stay in Lyudmila’s childhood home, sharing the space with her parents.

As they settle in, the newlyweds move a painting—purchased by Anatoly and Tatyana 28 years ago for New Year’s Eve 1930—from their room into the parents' room.

Lyudmila and Igor are both architects, and Igor is tasked with leading a team designing a new residential district. The younger generation frequently gathers at the Korolevs’ home, discussing their aspirations, challenges, and the possibilities of the upcoming construction project.

In due course, the young couple welcomes a baby and decide to raise the child at home instead of sending them to daycare.

== Cast ==
- Aleksey Gribov as Anatoly Kuzmich Korolyov
- Zoya Fyodorova as Tatyana Ivanova
- Liliya Aleshnikova as Lysusya
- Aleksandr Demyanenko as Igor
- Vsevolod Sanaev as Vasili Vasilyevich
- Andrey Tutyshkin as Boris Vladimirovich
- Gennadiy Bortnikov
