= Viy (1967 film) =

1967 film by Konstantin Yershov

- Russian theatrical release poster
- Directed by: Konstantin Yershov; Georgi Kropachyov
- Screenplay by: Aleksandr Ptushko; Konstantin Yershov; Georgi Kropachyov
- Based on: Viy by Nikolai Gogol
- Starring: Leonid Kuravlyov; Natalya Varley; Alexei Glazyrin; Vadim Zakharchenko; Nikolai Kutuzov
- Cinematography: Fyodor Provorov; Viktor Pishchalnikov
- Edited by: R. Pesetskaya; Tamara Zubova
- Music by: Karen Khachaturian
- Production company: Artistic Association "LUCH"
- Distributed by: Mosfilm
- Release date: 27 November 1967
- Running time: 76 minutes
- Country: Soviet Union
- Language: Russian
- Budget: 50,000 Soviet Ruble

Viy (Spirit of Evil, or Vii; Russian: Вий, Russian pronunciation: [vʲij]) is a 1967 Soviet Gothic dark fantasy folk horror film directed by Konstantin Yershov and Georgi Kropachyov. Based on the story of the same name by Nikolai Gogol, the film's screenplay was written by Yershov, Kropachyov and Aleksandr Ptushko. The film was distributed by Mosfilm.

== Plot ==
As the students of a Kiev seminary are sent home for vacation, three of them become lost in the countryside in the middle of the night. They spot a farmhouse and ask the old woman at the gate to let them spend the night. She agrees, on the condition that they sleep in separate areas of the farm. As one of the students, Khoma Brutus, lies down in the barn to sleep, the old woman sneaks into the barn. She hypnotizes him, climbs on his back and rides him across the countryside like a horse. Khoma suddenly finds that they are flying and realizes she is a witch. Invoking the name of Christ, he forces her to land and beats her violently with a stick until she turns into a beautiful young woman, who cries out that he is killing her.

Terrified, Khoma runs back to his seminary, where the rector informs him that a wealthy sotnik's dying daughter has specifically requested that Khoma say prayers for her soul. He reluctantly complies and finds he is returning to the farm where he met the witch. The girl dies before he arrives, and to his horror, he realizes she is the witch and that he has caused her death. The sotnik promises Khoma great reward if he will stand vigil and pray for her soul for the next three nights. If he does not, grave punishment is implied. After the funeral rites, the villagers tell the story of a huntsman who was bewitched by the girl and asked her to ride him like a horse, reminding Khoma of his own encounter.

Khoma is taken to the chapel where the girl's corpse lies and is locked in for the night. He lights every candle in the chapel and begins to recite the prayers. He pauses to sniff tobacco, and when he sneezes, the girl opens her eyes and climbs out of the coffin. Khoma quickly draws a sacred circle of chalk around himself, which acts as a barrier. Hearing him but unable to see him, the girl persistently tries to get to him as he prays fervently. When the rooster crows in the morning, the girl returns to her coffin and all the candles blow out.

Khoma gets drunk to strengthen himself for the second night. He draws the sacred circle again and begins his prayers. The coffin rises into the air and bangs against the sacred circle's barrier, prompting a panicked Khoma to pray for God's protection. Standing up in the coffin, the girl flies around the sacred circle while repeatedly calling out Khoma's name. As the rooster crows, the coffin returns to its place, and shortly after the girl lies down, she attempts to curse Khoma, causing his hair to turn grey.

Trying to explain what happened in the chapel, Khoma pleads with the sotnik to be allowed to leave, but the sotnik threatens him with a thousand lashes if he refuses, while offering him a thousand chervontsy if he completes the task. Khoma attempts to escape but is stopped by the sotnik's servants, who bring him back to the farm.

On the third and final night, a drunken Khoma once again draws the sacred circle before beginning his prayers. The girl summons various demonic figures to torment him, but they cannot get past the sacred circle either. She ultimately summons Viy, a large humanoid creature. Khoma believes himself to be safe upon hearing the rooster crow, but when he makes eye contact with Viy, Viy commands the demons to attack Khoma. The rooster crows again and the demons all flee, leaving Khoma motionless on the floor. The girl turns back into the old woman and lies down in the coffin, which instantly falls apart. The rector enters the chapel and, seeing what has happened, races off to tell the others.

Back at the seminary, one of Khoma's two friends proposes they drink to his memory, while the other doubts that Khoma is actually dead.

== Cast ==
- Leonid Kuravlyov as Khoma Brutus
- Natalya Varley as Pannochka (voiced by Klara Rumyanova)
- Alexei Glazyrin as sotnik
- Nikolai Kutuzov as witch
- Vadim Zakharchenko as Khalyava, one of Khoma's friends
- Pyotr Vesklyarov as rector / Dorosh
- Vladimir Salnikov as Gorobets, one of Khoma's friends
- Dmitri Kapka as Overko
- Stepan Shkurat as Yavtukh
- Georgy Sochevko as Stepan
- Nikolai Yakovchenko as Spirid
- Nikolai Panasyev as comforter
- Boryslav Brondukov as seminarian (uncredited)

== Production ==
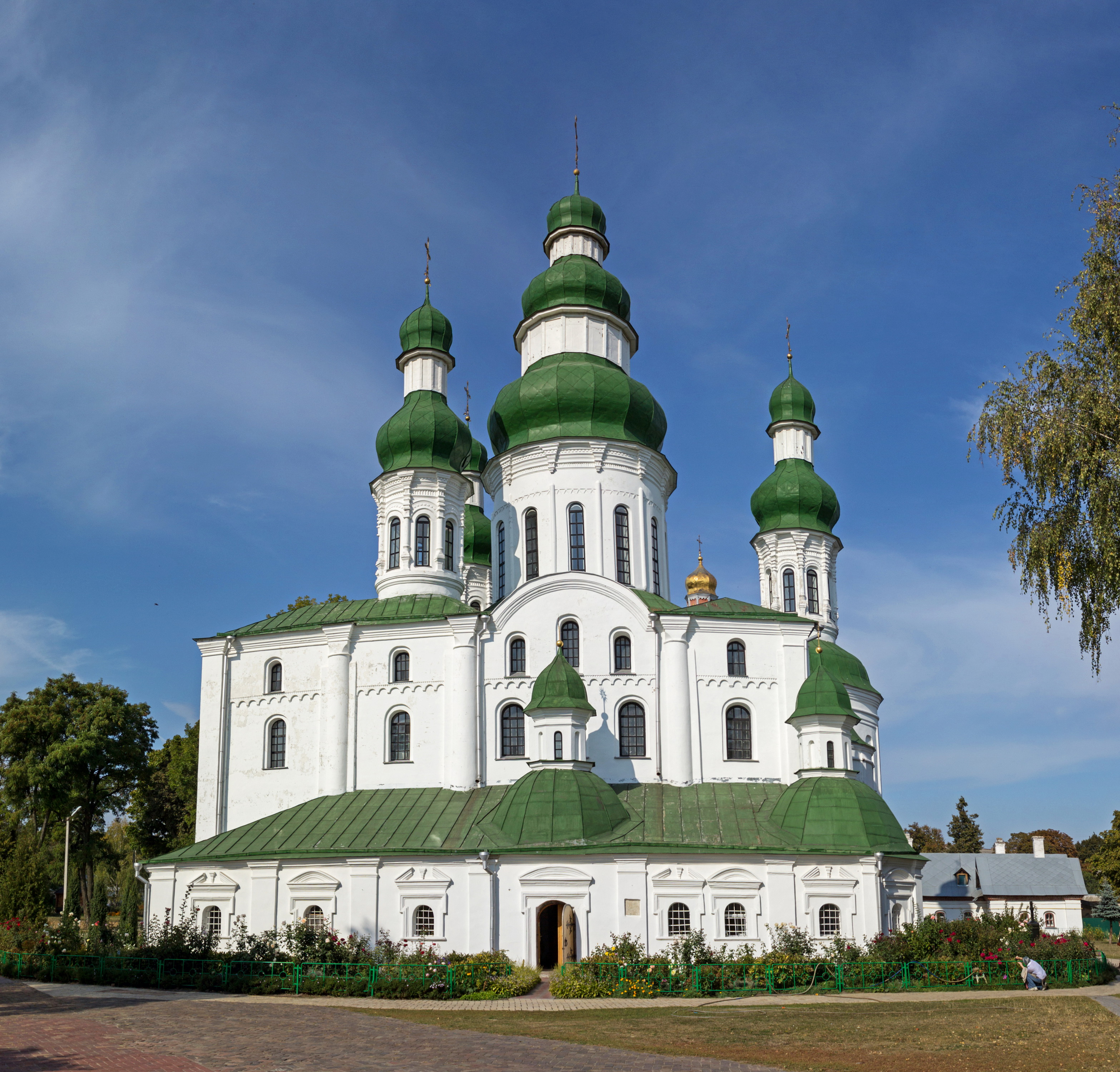
The seminary was filmed in the Eletsky Monastery, Chernihiv.

One of the filming locations was the village of Horoholyn lis in Ivano-Frankivsk Oblast, Ukraine. Shooting took place in a wooden church. It burned down in 2006 and was rebuilt.

Some of the "witch" scenes and the ending where Viy appears were toned down due to technological limitations as well as then current restrictions on Soviet film production. The directors were able to avoid the previous restrictions by using what was considered a "folk tale".

== Reception ==
Richard Gilliam of AllMovie gave the film four out of five stars, commending production design, pacing, and Kuravlyov's performance. In his book 1001 Movies You Must See Before You Die, Steven Jay Schneider refers to the film as "a colorful, entertaining, and genuinely frightening film of demons and witchcraft that boasts some remarkable special-effects work by Russia's master of cinematic fantasy, Aleksandr Ptushko." Anne Billson wrote in Sight & Sound that "Thanks to effects that transcend the limitations of their time, the uncanny occurrences of 'Viy' can still generate a frisson" and that "this exquisite presentation is a must-see for every aficionado of folk-horror and dark fairytales." Martin Unsworth of Starburst gave the film a five star rating, declaring that what "makes Viy so special isn’t so much the direction of Konstantin Ershov and Georgiy Kropachyov but the effects created by Aleksandr Ptushko alongside the cinematography of Viktor Pishchalnikov and Fyodor Provorov. There are terrifying moments early on that stand out, especially the transgressive scene involving the old witch (played by male actor Nikolai Kutuzov), which is the stuff of nightmares alone. The film gains its classic status, however, thanks to a bombardment of in-camera effects, jaunty camera angles, and a building sense of dread that explodes with an assault of strange, nightmarish characters."

== Home media ==
The film was released on DVD on 21 August 2001 by Image Entertainment. It was re-released on DVD by Hanzibar Films on 28 March 2005. Severin Films released the film on Blu-ray in 2019.

== Remake ==
A modern version starring Jason Flemyng was in production for several years and went through several different deadlines, but was released in 2014. The 1990 Serbian version of the film, called A Holy Place, ran on the Fantasia Festival 2010.
