= An Incident that no one noticed =

- Russian: Происшествие, которого никто не заметил
- Directed by: Aleksandr Volodin
- Written by: Aleksandr Volodin
- Starring: Nikolay Gubenko; Mikhail Fyodorov; Rodion Nahapetov; Vasiliy Lanovoy; Anastasiya Voznesenskaya
- Release date: 1967
- Country: Soviet Union
- Language: Russian

An Incident that no one noticed (Russian: Происшествие, которого никто не заметил) is a 1967 Soviet teen romance film directed by Aleksandr Volodin.

== Plot ==
The film tells about a modest saleswoman of a greengrocery store named Nastya, who dreams of becoming beautiful and happy. And suddenly the dream begins to come true.

== Cast ==
- Zhanna Prokhorenko as Nastya
- Vera Titova as Mother
- Yevgeny Lebedev as Yakov Alexeyevich (as Yevgeni Lebedev)
- Vitali Solomin as Tolya
- Georgiy Shtil as Lyosha
- Zinaida Slavina as Katya
- Pavel Luspekayev as Teterin
- Arkadi Trusov
- Lidiya Shtykan as Nina Sergeyevna
- Iya Arepina
- Ignat Leyrer as A man in love
