= American Daughter =

- Directed by: Karen Shakhnazarov
- Written by: Alexander Borodyansky; Karen Shakhnazarov
- Produced by: Boris Giller
- Starring: Vladimir Mashkov; Allison Whitbeck
- Cinematography: Vladimir Shevtsik
- Edited by: Lydia Milioti
- Music by: Anatoly Kroll
- Production company: Mosfilm
- Release date: 1995
- Running time: 98 min
- Countries: Russia; United States
- Languages: Russian; English

American Daughter (Russian: Американская дочь, romanized: Amerikanskaya doch) is a Russian road comedy-drama film directed by Karen Shakhnazarov.

== Plot ==
Alexey is a musician at a Moscow restaurant, who arrives in San Francisco to kidnap his daughter. Little Anya was secretly taken away by his ex-wife, who is married to a respectable American.

After a touching meeting with his daughter, they begin hitchhiking throughout America, full of comedic situations and adventures.

He ends up in prison for kidnapping and the former spouse visits him and offers a deal - he will be released if he signs the official refusal of the child. Alexey does not agree to abandon his daughter.

Some time passes. In the American prison, the prisoners are busy doing yard work, but suddenly the roar of a helicopter that flies around, and then lands directly on the territory of the zone, is heard in the sky. The cockpit door opens. At the helm is Anya. She calls her father who is perplexed, but gets into the helicopter with his American friend. They take off.

== Cast ==
- Vladimir Mashkov as Alexey
- Allison Whitbeck as Anya / Anne
- Maria Shukshina as Olga Varakina, Anya's mother
- Armen Dzhigarkhanyan as Archie Ardov, a friend of Aleksei's in America
- Teddy Lane Jr. as Smith, Aleksei's cellmate

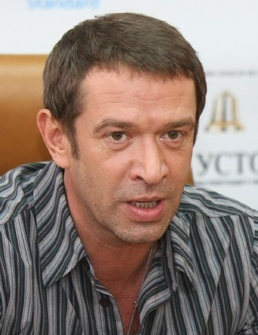
Vladimir Mashkov

== Awards and nominations ==
Awards and nominations
Award	Year	Category	Nominee	Result	Ref.
Kinotavr	1995	Grand Prize	American Daughter	Nominated	
Kinotavr	1995	Prize of the Presidential Council	Allison Whitbeck	Won	
Shanghai International Film Festival	1995	Special Jury Award	Karen Shakhnazarov	Won	
Nika Awards	1995	Best Sound Editing	Igor Mayorov	Nominated	
Artek Children's Film Festival	1995	Best Actress	Allison Whitbeck	Won	
Golden Aries	1995	Best Producer	Boris Giller	Won	
