= Vyacheslav Voronin (actor) =

Soviet and Ukrainian actor

- Вячеслав Воронин
- Born: November 7, 1934; Zherdevsky District, Tambov Oblast, Russian SFSR, Soviet Union
- Died: October 7, 2016 (aged 81); Kyiv, Ukraine
- Occupation: Actor
- Years active: 1957—2016
- Awards: Merited Artist of Ukraine (2003)

Vyacheslav Anatolyevich Voronin (Russian: Вячеслав Анатольевич Воронин, Ukrainian: В'ячеслав Анатолійович Воронін, romanized: Viacheslav Anatoliyovych Voronin); November 7, 1934 — October 7, 2016) was a Soviet, Russian, and Ukrainian actor. He was also a Merited Artist of Ukraine (2003).

== Biography ==
Voronin was born November 7, 1934 in the village of Chebizovka (now Zherdevka, Tambov Oblast).

A graduate of the actors faculty of VGIK, from 1957, he has worked in the movie.

From 1985 to 1992, he was director of the Kyiv actors studio.

In his later years, he underwent several operations due to illness. He lived in Kyiv, Lisovyi masyv. He died on October 7, 2016.

== Selected filmography ==
- The First Echelon (1955)
- City Lights (1958)
- Kochubey (1958)
- Ivanna (1959)
- People of Мy Valley (1960)
- Clues from the Sky (1964)
- The Dream (1964)
- Wedding in Malinovka (1967)
- Liberation (1970)
- Guarneri Quartet (1978)
- Tenderness to the Roaring Beast (1982)
- Torpedo Bombers (1983)
- Reportage (1995)
- American Blues (1995)
- Muhtar's Return 3 (2006)

== Personal life ==
- His first wife was actress Lidiya Fedoseyeva-Shukshina, married from 1959 to 1963. In 1960, they had a daughter, Anastasia.
  - His granddaughter was Laura Francisco.
    - His great-grandson was Martin.
- His second wife was Svetlana. His son was Vyacheslav (born 1973).
