= Two Days of Miracles =

- Directed by: Lev Mirsky
- Written by: M. Pryadkin, Aleksandr Khmelik.
- Starring: Leonid Kuravlyov; Borya Mayhrovsky; Mikhail Kozakov
- Narrated by: Zinovy Gerdt
- Cinematography: Aleksandr Rybin
- Edited by: V. Vasilyeva
- Music by: Bogdan Trotskuk
- Production company: Gorky Film Studio
- Release date: 1970
- Running time: 68 minutes
- Country: Soviet Union
- Language: Russian

Two Days of Miracles (Russian: Два дня чудес, romanized: Dva dnya dlya chudes) is a 1970 Soviet children's comedy film directed by Lev Mirsky based on the play Simply Awful! by Yuri Sotnik.

== Plot ==
Young undereducated fairies Daisy and Violet from the Institute of Good Wizards after an unsuccessful exam go among people to get real-life practice and perform a "good miracle". After materializing on a boat, the fairies overhear the conversation of the head of the therapeutic department of the polyclinic Vadim Leonidovich, his wife and their son, who are returning from vacation. The fairies offer to change their places, and turn the mother into a girl. Vadim Leonidovich does not take the offer seriously and jokingly agrees. The fairies, rejoicing at the opportunity to perform a "good miracle", cast a spell and turn the father into a son, the son into father, and mother ... into a cactus.

At the same time, two other female sorceresses from the Institute of minor mischief also appear among people to commit more trouble.

Since the next day is the 1st of September, the son needs to go to school, and the father to work in the clinic, they try to teach and prepare each other for unexpectedly new habits and responsibilities in their childhood and adulthood. And the fairies Daisy and Violet somehow manage to correct their mistake - they turn the mother-cactus into a mother-girl.

== Cast ==
- Leonid Kuravlyov - Vadim Murashev
- Borya Mayhrovsky - Grisha Murashev
- Mikhail Kozakov - professor-examiner of the Institute of Good Wizards
- Elena Mozgovaya - fairy Violet
- Natalia Markina - fairy Daisy
- Erast Garin - professor-examiner at the Koshchei Immortal
- Olga Aroseva - witch student Alfa Ivanovna Kokoshkina
- Tamara Chernova - witch student Marfa Petrovna
- Lidia Belinskaya (Lydia Petrovna, Grisha's mother)
- Yuri Kritenko - Alexander Yefimovich Tukachev, head physician
- Alexander Nazarov - Rostislav Mikhailovich, a psychiatrist
- Lyudmila Stoyanova - young specialist Julia Ivanovna
- Elena Malikova - Lida, mother-girl
- Mariika Lokshina - Lilya
- Slava Glushkov - Petya
- Yasha Ovchukov - Artyom

== See also ==
- Simply Awful!, 1982 adaptation of the same play.
