= Emma Treyvas =

Emiliya Moiseyevna Treyvas (Emma Treyvas, Russian: Эмилия Моисеевна Трейвас, Эмма Трейвас; August 26, 1918 – January 8, 1982) was a Soviet Jewish stage and film actress. Her roles were mostly of comic character.

During 1943–1958 she played in the Central Theatre of Transport (now Nikolai Gogol Drama Theatre) and later in Moskoncert (1958–1982).

During the 1960s she played in 17 films. Her best known film role was Tryndychikha in the 1967 Soviet musical comedy film Wedding in Malinovka.

Her husband was actor Vladimir Mamontov.

She died on January 8, 1982, and her ashes are at the columbarium of Donskoy Cemetery, Moscow.

== Filmography ==
Year	Title	Role	Notes
1960	Devichya vesna	Angelina Antonovna	
1962	Vesyolye istorii	Tyotya s sobyakoy	
1963	Cheryomushki	Mylkina	
1963	Neobyknovennyy gorod		
1963	Bolshaya doroga		
1964	Vnimanie! V gorode volshebnik!	Mariya Ivanovna	
1966	Chelovek bez pasporta	Bufetnitsa v vagone-restorane	
1967	Wedding in Malinovka	Trandychikha	
