= Vladimir Belyaev (writer) =

Vladimir Pavlovich Belyaev (Russian: Влади́мир Па́влович Беля́ев; 3 April [O.S. 21 March] 1909, Kamianets-Podilskyi – 11 February 1990) was a Soviet and Russian writer born in Ukraine. He is famous for his trilogy The Old Fortress (Старая Крепость) about boys living in Kamenets-Podolsky during the Russian Civil War. The trilogy was written in 1937–1951, and was awarded the Stalin Prize of 1952.
