= Yevgeni Lebedev =

Soviet and Russian actor and pedagogue

Yevgeni Lebedev Евгений Лебедев (in Russian)
- Born: Yevgeni Alekseyevich Lebedev; January 15, 1917; Balakovo, Samara Governorate, Russian Empire
- Died: June 9, 1997 (aged 80); Saint Petersburg, Russia
- Occupations: Actor, pedagogue
- Years active: 1940–1997
- Spouse: Natella Tovstonogova
- Children: 2

Yevgeni Alekseyevich Lebedev (Russian: Евгeний Алeксeeвич Лeбeдeв, IPA: [jɪvˈɡʲenʲɪj ɐlʲɪkˈsʲe(j)ɪvʲɪtɕ ˈlʲebʲɪdʲɪf]; January 15, 1917, Balakovo – June 9, 1997, Saint Petersburg) was a Soviet and Russian actor and pedagogue. People's Artist of the USSR (1968) and Hero of Socialist Labour (1987).

== Biography ==
Yevgeni Lebedev was born in Balakovo (now — Saratov Oblast), in the family of a priest, and later was forced to hide his origin.

== Partial filmography ==
- Rimsky-Korsakov (1953) as Kashchey the Deathless in opera (uncredited)
- Unfinished Story (1955) as Fyodor Ivanovich
- Two Captains (1956) as Romashov
- Virgin Soil Upturned (1960) as Agafon Dubtsov
- Going Inside a Storm (1966) as Agatov
- Wedding in Malinovka (1967) as Nechipor
- An Incident that no one noticed (1967) as Yakov Alexeyevich
- No Path Through Fire (1968) as colonel
- Straight Line (1968) as Neslezkin
- Subject for a Short Story (1969) as Pavel Yegorovich Chekhov
- Strange People (1970) (segment "Rokovoj vystrel")
- Crime and Punishment (1970) as Marmeladov
- The Beginning (1970) as Cauchon
- Adventures of the Yellow Suitcase (1970) as children's doctor
- Interrogation (1979) as cellmate
- Centaurs (1979) as General Pin
- Life Is Beautiful (1979) as Rostao
- Squadron of Flying Hussars (1981) as Mikhail Kutuzov
- Farewell of Slavianka (1985) as Semyon Protasovich
- Sikimoku (1993) as Kseniya Ivanovna Nekrasova, old woman
- To whom will God send (1994) (final film role)

== Awards and honors ==
- Honored Artist of the RSFSR (1953)
- People's Artist of the RSFSR (1962)
- People's Artist of the USSR (1968)
- Hero of Socialist Labour (1987)
- Two Orders of Lenin (1971, 1987)
- Order "For Merit to the Fatherland", 3rd class (1997)
- Medal For the Defence of the Caucasus (1945)
- Medal For Valiant Labour in the Great Patriotic War 1941–1945 (1945)
- Medal In Commemoration of the 250th Anniversary of Leningrad (1957)
- Order of the Red Banner of Labour (1977)
- Badge For services to Polish culture (1979)
- Medal "Veteran of Labour" (1984)
- Lenin Prize (1986)
- Stalin Prize first-degree (1950)
- USSR State Prize (1968)
- Vasilyev Brothers State Prize of the RSFSR (1980)
- The prize Golden Nymph International Festival in Monte Carlo (1977)
- The award of the KGB of the USSR in the field of literature and art of I degree (1984)
- Award St. Petersburg Mayor Anatoly Sobchak For outstanding achievements in the development of culture (1994)
- Highest theater prize Saint-Petersburg Gold spotlights - special prize For creative longevity and unique contribution to the theatrical culture (1996) [10]
- Mar del Plata International Film Festival for Best Actor (1966)
- Honorary Citizen of Balakovo (1987)
- Honorary citizen of Tbilisi (1992)
- Honorary Citizen of St. Petersburg (1996)
