= Vsevolod Sanayev =

Russian-Soviet actor (1912–1996)

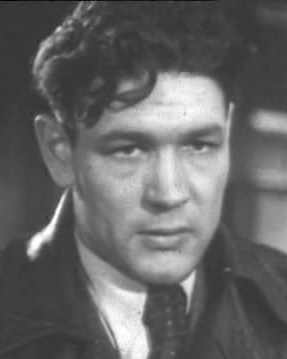
- Sanayev in The Beloved (1940)
- Born: Vsevolod Vasilyevich Sanayev; 25 February 1912; Tula, Russian Empire
- Died: 27 January 1996 (aged 83); Moscow, Russia
- Occupations: Actor, theater pedagogue
- Years active: 1934–1995
- Awards: People's Artist of the USSR (1969)

Vsevolod Vasilyevich Sanayev (Russian: Всеволод Васильевич Санаев; 25 February 1912, Tula – 27 January 1996, Moscow) was a Soviet film and stage actor popular in the 1960s–1970s. Sanayev, a Moscow Art Theatre (and later Mossovet Theatre) actor, was honored in 1969 with the People's Artist of the USSR title; among his other accolades are the Order of Lenin (1971) and the Order of the October Revolution (1981).

== Biography ==
Vsevolod Sanayev was born in Tula. From 1926 to 1930 he worked as a bayan technician at the Tula factory of musical instruments. After a short stint at a local theatre, in 1931 he was invited to join the Tula-based Gorky Theatre of Drama and Comedy and soon enrolled in the Russian Institute of Theatre Arts. After the graduation in 1937 he joined the Moscow Art Theatre troupe. In 1938, he debuted on screen in the film Volga-Volga (where he had two minor roles), and in 1940 enjoyed his first success as Dobryakov in the film The Girl I Love. In 1943, Sanayev joined the Mossovet Theatre and in 1952 moved to the Moscow Art Theatre.

The mass popularity came to Sanayev in the 1950s and 1960s; among his best known roles were Kantaurov in The Return of Vasily Bortnikov (1952), Dontsov in The First Echelon (1955), Kozlov in Five Days, Five Nights (1960), Siply (Husky) in Optimistic Tragedy (1962); later Colonel Lukin in the war epic Liberation (1968), Professor Stepanov in Pechki-lavochki (1972), and Colonel Zorin (The Return of St. Luca, 1970; The Black Prince, 1973, and The Version of Colonel Zorin, 1978). A staunch communist, Sanayev for many years was the head of the Mosfilm Communist Party committee (partkom).

Vsevolod Sanayev died on 27 January 1996 in Moscow. He is interred in Novodevichy Cemetery.

== Family ==
Vsevolod Sanayev was married to Lidya Sanayeva (1918–1995). Their daughter, the actress Elena Sanayeva, is a widow of the actor and director Rolan Bykov. His grandson Pavel Sanayev is an actor, scriptwriter, theatre director and playwright. His acclaimed 1995 autobiographical play Bury Me Under a Baseboard told the harrowing story of his life with a tyrannous grandmother, whom his mother left him with after her marriage.

== Filmography ==
- Volga-Volga (1938) as bearded lumberjack; member of the symphony orchestra (dual role)
- If War Comes Tomorrow (1939) as paratrooper
- A Girl with a Temper (1939) as Surkov, militia officer
- The Youth of Commanders (1939) as Colonel Grishayev
- The Beloved as Vasiliy Dobryakov, a working man
- Ivan Fyodorov, The Pioneer Bookprinter (1941) as Petr Timofeev, Ivan's assistant
- Four Hearts (1945) as Red Army fighter Yeremeev
- Ivan Nikulin (1945) as Alyosha
- In the Mountains of Yugoslavia (1947) as Alexey Gubanov
- Diamonds (1947) as geologist Sergey Nesterov
- Pages of Life (1948) as radio announcer (uncredited)
- They've Got Their Motherland (1950) as Sorokin
- Zhukovsky (1950) as student (uncredited)
- In Steppe (1951, short) as Partkom secretary Tuzhikov
- The Village Doctor (1951) as Nikolay Korotkov
- The Return of Vasily Bortnikov (1953) as Kantaurov, the Telephone station director
- Lawlessness (1954, short) as Yermolai, dustman
- The First Echelon (Pervy eshelon, 1956) as sovkhoz director Dontsov
- Different Fortunes (1956) as Zhukov, the Party official
- Polyushko-pole (1956) as telephone station director Kholin
- Stories About Lenin (1957) as Emelyyanov
- The Swallow (1957) as Melgunov
- Pages of the Past (1957) as Skvortsov
- Esimese järgu kapten (1958) as sailor (voice)
- Upon the Path of War (Na dorogakh voyny, 1959) as Uvarov
- In the Still of the Steppe (1959) as Vetrov
- The Unpaid Debt (1959) as Aleksey Okunchikov
- Still They Are People (1959) as soldier
- The Koltsov Song (1959) as Koltsov's father
- Three Times Resurrected (1960) as Starodub
- Five Days, Five Nights (1961) as Sergeant-major Kozlov
- On the Road (1961) as the old man
- Adult Children (1961) as Vasily Vasilyevich
- An Optimistic Tragedy (Optimisticheskaya tragediya, 1963) - Siply [the Husky-voiced]
- It Happened at the Police Station (1963) as Major Sazonov
- Small Green Light (1964) as the pensioner
- The Big Ore (1964) as Matsuev
- The Meeting at the Crossover (1964) as kolkhoz chairman
- The Roll-call (1966) as Varentsov
- Your Son and Brother (1966) as Voyevodin
- Not a Day Without an Adventure (1967) as old man Danilyuk
- In the Trap (1967) as Kovacs
- Moscow is Behind Our Backs (1968) as General Ivan Panfilov
- Just for Fun (1968) as Gomozov
- Used Cartridge Cases (1968) as father
- Liberation (1968) as Colonel Lukin
- The Major Witness (1969) as uncle
- I Am His Bride (1969) as Mitrokhin
- The Kremlin Chime (1970) as the old worker
- Strange People (1970) as Matvey Ryazantsev
- The Stolen Train (1971) as General Ivan Vasylievich
- The Return of Saint Luke (1971) as Colonel Zorin
- Not a Day Without Adventures (1971) as Danilyuk
- Happy Go Lucky (1972) as Professor Sergey Fyodorovich
- Eolomea (East Germany, 1972) as Kun
- Nyurka's Life (1972) as Boris Gavrilovich
- The Black Prince (1973) as Colonel Zorin
- Here's Our Home (1973) as Alexander Pluzhin
- There, Over the Horizon (1975) as the General constructor
- The Closeness of Distant Things (1976) as Pogodin
- The Moscow Time (1976) as Nazar Lukich Grigorenko
- And Other Officials (1976) as Astakhov
- The Long Days' Month (1978, TV Movie) as Pavel Stepanovich
- The Colonel Zorin's Hypothesis (1979) as Colonel Zorin
- Teheran 43 (1981) as Innkeeper (uncredited)
- The Unwelcome Friend (1981) as Shlepyanov
- From Winter Till Winter (1981) as the Minister
- Private Life (1982) Bit part (uncredited)
- The Mystery of the Blackbirds (1982) as Mister George Forteskew
- White Dew (1982) as Fedos Khodas
- From Evening Till Noon (1982) as writer Andray Zharkov
- Secret of the Black Birds (1983) as George Fortescue
- Dead Souls (1984, TV Mini-Series) as the Court chairman
- The Hope and the Stand-by (1985) as Kirill Rotov
- In Bad Weather (1986) as Strogov
- The Apellation (1987) as Mironov
- Forgotten Melody for a Flute (1987) as Yaroslav Stepanovich
- What a Mess! (1995) as the music fan (final film role)
