= Nikolai Zhilin =

Russian ice hockey player

- Born: May 23, 1992 (age 32); Khabarovsk, Russia
- Height: 6 ft 2 in (188 cm)
- Weight: 194 lb (88 kg; 13 st 12 lb)
- Position: Defence
- Shoots: Left
- VHL team Former teams: Yuzhny Ural Orsk; Avtomobilist Yekaterinburg; PSK Sakhalin; MsHK Žilina
- NHL draft: Undrafted
- Playing career: 2012–present

Nikolai Zhilin (born May 23, 1992) is a Russian professional ice hockey defenceman. He is currently playing for Yuzhny Ural Orsk of the Supreme Hockey League (VHL).

Zhilin made his KHL debut playing with Avtomobilist Yekaterinburg during the 2013–14 KHL season, playing ten games and registering one assist.
