= Vasily Shukshin =

Russian writer (1929–1974)

- Василий Шукшин
- Born: 25 July 1929; Srostki, Russian SFSR, Soviet Union
- Died: 2 October 1974 (aged 45) near Kletskaya, Russian SFSR, Soviet Union
- Notable work: The Red Snowball Tree (1974)
- Spouse: Mariya Shumskaya (m. 1955; div. 1957) Lidiya Fedoseyeva (m. 1964)
- Partner: Viktoriya Sofronova (1963–1965)
- Children: 3

Vasily Makarovich Shukshin (Russian: Василий Макарович Шукшин; 25 July 1929 – 2 October 1974) was a Soviet and Russian writer, actor, screenwriter and film director from the Altai region who specialized in rural themes. A prominent member of the Village Prose movement, he began writing short stories in his early teenage years and later transitioned to acting by his late 20s.

== Biography ==
Vasiliy Makarovich Shukshin was born on 25 July 1929 to a peasant family of assimilated Moksha Mordvin origin in the village of Srostki near Biysk in Siberian Krai, Soviet Union (now in Altai Krai, Russia). In 1933, his father, Makar Leontievich Shukshin, was arrested and executed on the charges of participating in an "anti-kolkhoz plot" during the Soviet collectivization. He was only rehabilitated 23 years later, in 1956. His mother, Maria Sergeyevna (née Popova), thus had to look after the survival of the entire family. By 1943, Shukshin had finished seven years of village school and entered an automobile technical school in Biysk. In 1945, after two and a half years at the school but before finishing, he quit to work in a kolkhoz.

In 1946, Shukshin left his native village and worked as a metal craftsman at several enterprises in the trust Soyuzprommekhanizatsiya: at the turbine plant in Kaluga, at the tractor plant in Vladimir, etc. In 1949, Shukshin was drafted into the Navy. He first served as a sailor in the Baltic Fleet, then a radio operator on the Black Sea. In 1953, he was demobilized due to a stomach ulcer and returned to his native village. Having passed an external exam for high school graduation, he became a teacher of Russian, and later a school principal in Srostki.

In 1954, Shukshin entered the directors' department of the VGIK; he studied under Mikhail Romm and Sergei Gerasimov, and graduated in 1960. While studying at VGIK in 1958, Shukshin had his first leading role in Marlen Khutsiyev's film Two Fedors and appeared in Andrei Tarkovsky's graduation film.

In 1958 he published his first short story "Two on the Cart" in the magazine Smena. His first collection of stories, Сельские жители (Village Dwellers) was published in 1963. That same year, he became staff director at the Gorky Film Studio in Moscow. He wrote and directed Живёт такой парень (There Is This Lad). The film premiered in 1965, winning top honours at the All-Union Film Festival in Leningrad and the Golden Lion at the XVI International Film Festival in Venice. Shukshin was decorated with the Order of the Red Banner of Labour (1967), and was designated Distinguished Artist of the RSFSR (1969).

Shukshin's main interest lay in the situation of ordinary, simple people in the Soviet Union of his time. He laced his films with both humor and melancholy.

He married actress Lidiya Fedoseyeva in 1964; she also appeared in several of his films. Their daughter Mariya is a TV presenter.

Shukshin died suddenly of a supposed heart attack on 2 October 1974, on the motor ship Dunai, on the Volga River, while filming They Fought for Their Country. He is buried in Novodevichy Cemetery in Moscow.

== English translations ==
- I Want to Live, Progress Publishers, 1978.
- Snowball Berry Red and Other Stories, Ardis Publishers, 1979.
- Short Stories, Raduga Publishers, 1990.
- Roubles in Words, Kopeks in Figures, Marion Boyars, 1994.
- Stories from a Siberian Village, Northern Illinois University Press, 1996.

== Theatre adaptation ==
Latvian theatre director Alvis Hermanis adapted eight of Shuksin's short stories for stage, in a collaboration with the Theatre of Nations in Moscow, entitled Shuksin's Stories or Shuksin's Tales. As of 2021 it is still touring the world, having first being staged in around 2009, and has won several awards. Starring Yevgeny Mironov, the play was staged at The Barbican in London in October 2019.

== Filmography ==
- 1956: The Killers (Russian: Убийцы) (Short) as Ole Andreson
- 1957: And Quiet Flows the Don (Russian: Тихий Дон) as minor role (uncredited)
- 1958: Two Fyodors (Russian: Два Фёдора) as Great Fyodor
- 1959: The Golden Eshelon (Russian: Золотой эшелон) as Andrey Nizovtsev
- 1960: A Simple Story (Russian: Простая история) as Ivan Lykov
- 1961: Mission (Russian: Командировка) as combine operator
- 1962: Alyonka (Russian: Алёнка) as Stepan Revan
- 1962: When the Trees Were Tall (Russian: Когда деревья были большими) as chairman of the kolkhoz
- 1963: We, Two of Men (Russian: Мы, двое мужчин) as Mikhail Gorlov
- 1964: There Is Such a Lad (Russian: Живет такой парень) (director, screenwriter)
- 1965: Your Son and Brother (Russian: Ваш сын и брат) (director, screenwriter)
- 1967: The Journalist (Russian: Журналист)
- 1967: The Commissar (Russian: Комиссар) as The Commandant
- 1968: Three Days of Viktor Chernyshov (Russian: Три дня Виктора Чернышева) as Kravchenko
- 1969: Strange People (Russian: Странные люди) (director, screenwriter) as Nikolay Nikolayevich Larionov
- 1970: By the Lake (Russian: У озера) as Vasily Chernykh
- 1970: Liberation I: The Fire Bulge (Russian: Освобождение) as Gen. Konev
- 1970: Liberation II: Breakthrough (Russian: Освобождение) as Gen. Konev
- 1970: Lyubov Yarovaya (Russian: Любовь Яровая) as Roman Koshkin
- 1971: Dauria (Russian: Даурия) as Vasily Ulybin
- 1971: Liberation III: Direction of the Main Blow (Russian: Освобождение) as Gen. Konev
- 1971: Liberation IV: The Battle of Berlin (Russian: Освобождение) as Ivan Konev
- 1971: Liberation V: The Last Assault (Russian: Освобождение) as Ivan Konev
- 1971: Soldier Came From The Front (Russian: Пришёл солдат с фронта) (screenwriter)
- 1972: Happy Go Lucky (Russian: Печки-лавочки) (director, screenwriter) as Ivan Rastorguyev
- 1974: The Red Snowball Tree (Russian: Калина красная) (director, screenwriter) as Yegor Prokudin
- 1974: If You Want To Be Happy (Russian: Если хочешь быть счастливым) as Vladimir Fedotov
- 1974: Fellows (Russian: Земляки) (screenwriter)
- 1975: They Fought for Their Country (Russian: Они сражались за Родину) as Piotr Lopakhin
- 1976: I Want the Floor (Russian: Прошу слова) as Fedya, plawright (final film role)
- 1977: Call Me To The Light Far (Russian: Позови меня в даль светлую) (screenwriter)
- 1988: Yolki-palki (Russian: Ёлки-палки) (writer)
- 2004: High Boots (Russian: Ботушки) (writer)
