= The Miracle Maker (1922 film) =

1922 film

- Directed by: Aleksandr Panteleyev
- Starring: Pyotr Kirillov
- Cinematography: Nikolai Kozlovsky
- Production company: Sevzapkino
- Release date: 29 August 1922
- Running time: 43 minutes
- Country: Soviet Union
- Language: Silent film

The Miracle Maker (Russian: Чудотворец, romanized: Chudotvorets) is a 1922 Soviet comedy film directed by Aleksandr Panteleyev.

== Plot ==
The story follows Yeremey Mizgir, a spirited young serf whose mischievous behavior leads his mistress to conscript him into the army. Mizgir is sent to serve in a Guards regiment in St. Petersburg. Clever, lively, and resourceful, he quickly adapts to military life and excels at his duties. Despite frequently getting into trouble with the sergeant for his antics, he maintains an optimistic and cheerful outlook. However, bad news arrives from his village: his elderly parents have lost their cow, and his fiancée, Dunya, is being relentlessly harassed by the estate manager. These worries weigh heavily on Mizgir’s heart.

One day, while standing guard over an opulently adorned icon of Our Lady of Kazan, embellished with diamonds and jewels, Mizgir contemplates how to help his struggling parents and protect his fiancée. Overwhelmed by desperation, he makes a bold decision. He smashes the glass encasing the icon and removes a large gemstone from the Virgin’s crown.

When the theft is discovered, Mizgir faces the authorities. Undaunted, he boldly declares that the gemstone was given to him directly by the Virgin Mary herself.

== Cast ==
- Pyotr Kirillov - Yeremei Mizgir
- Yelena Tumanskaya - Dunya
- Vasili Kozhura - Nicholas I
- Raisa Mamontova - Alexandra Feodorovna
