= Lidiya Fedoseyeva-Shukshina =

Russian actress (1938–2026)

- Лидия Федосеева-Шукшина
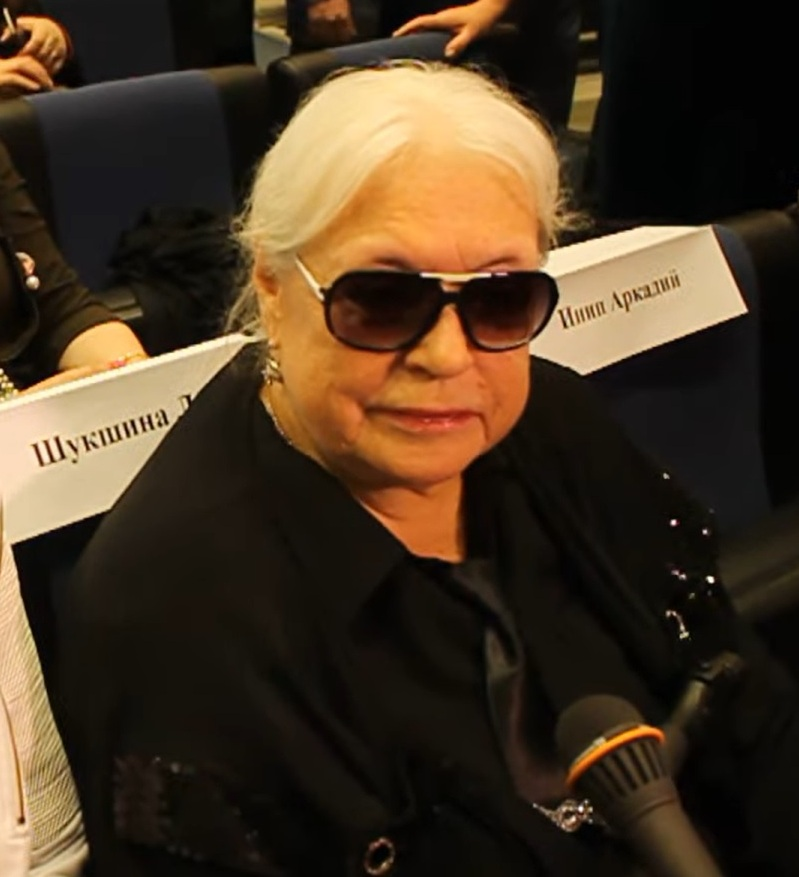
- Fedoseyeva-Shukshina in 2017
- Born: Lidiya Nikolayevna Fedoseyeva; 25 September 1938; Leningrad, Russian SFSR, Soviet Union
- Died: 6 November 2026 (aged 88); Moscow, Russia
- Occupation: Actress
- Years active: 1955–2026
- Spouses: Vyacheslav Voronin (m. 1959; div. 1963) Vasily Shukshin (m. 1964; died 1974) Mikhail Agranovich (m. 1975; div. 1984) Marek Mezheevskiy (m. 1984; div. 1988) Bari Alibasov (m. 2018; div. 2021)
- Children: 3

Lidiya Nikolayevna Fedoseyeva-Shukshina (Russian: Лидия Николаевна Федосеева-Шукшина; 25 September 1938 – 6 November 2026) was a Russian actress. She was the widow of writer, actor and director Vasily Shukshin. She was the mother of actress and television presenter Maria Shukshina.

== Early life and career ==
Fedoseyeva was born in Leningrad on 25 September 1938. From 1946 to 1956, she studied in school No. 217 (formerly known as Saint Peter's School). She was engaged in the drama club of the House of Cinema under the leadership of Matvey Dubrovin.

In 1964, she graduated from VGIK workshop of Sergei Gerasimov and Tamara Makarova.

She acted in feature films from 1955, with her cinematic debut being an uncredited role of a laboratory assistant in the film Maksim Perepelitsa, directed by Anatoly Granik. The first major role was played by Lidiya Fedoseyeva in the film Peers (1959).

When working on the set of the 1964 film What is it, the sea?, Lidiya met her future husband, writer, actor and director Vasily Shukshin, whom she married in the same year. The actress got her breakthrough in the films of her husband, in which she played folk heroines — simple Russian women, sincere and trustful, endowed with inner strength, such are Nyura in the picture Happy Go Lucky (1972) and Lyuba Baykalova in the drama The Red Snowball Tree (1973).

After Shukshin's death in 1974, Lidiya Fedoseyeva took the double surname Fedoseyeva-Shukshina.

In the 1970s films, the actress continued the figurative line of the Shukshin heroines, starring in the films Tran-Grass (1976) by Sergei Nikonenko and Call Me to the Bright Side (1977) by Stanislav Lubshin and Herman Lavrov.

Fedoseyeva-Shukshina acted in many historical films, such as The Youth of Peter the Great (1980), Demidovs (1983), Viva Gardes-Marines! (1991), Petersburg Secrets (1994), Countess Sheremetev (1994), Prince Yuri Dolgoruky (1998). Popular screen adaptations of novels with her appearance included are Dead Souls (1984), Evenings on a Farm near Dikanka (2001) by Nikolai Gogol, Little Tragedies (1979) by Alexander Pushkin, Road to Calvary (1977) by Alexei Tolstoy, The Kreutzer Sonata (1987) by Leo Tolstoy, and others.

She played in the Polish films Until the Last Drop of Blood (1979) and Ballad of Yanushik (1987).

Other notable films featuring the actress include Twelve Chairs (1976), Could One Imagine? (1980), Love with Privileges (1989). In total, she had over 80 roles in feature films.

Between 1974 and 1993, the actress worked in the National Film Actors' Theatre.

Fedoseyeva-Shukshina was the president and chairman of the jury of the All-Russian film festival "Viva, Cinema of Russia!".

== Personal life and death ==
From the first marriage with actor Vyacheslav Voronin, the actress had their daughter, Anastasia. From the marriage with Vasily Shukshin, she had two daughters, Maria and Olga. Maria, having graduated from the Institute of Foreign Languages, became a well-known film actress and television presenter. Olga graduated from VGIK and Literary Institute. Lidiya was married five times.

Fedoseyeva-Shukshina died from heart failure in Moscow, on 6 November 2026, at the age of 88.

== Honors ==
In 1984, the actress was awarded the title People’s Artist of the RSFSR. She was awarded the Order "For Merit to the Fatherland", 4th Degree (1998) for her great personal contribution to the development of motion pictures, and the Medal for Services to Society (2009). For the role in the film The Ballad of Yanushik (1988) Fedoseyeva-Shukshina was distinguished by the Polish Order of Arts.

== Selected filmography ==
- 1955 – Two Captains (Два капитана) as assistant
- 1956 – Maksim Perepelitsa (Максим Перепелица) as laboratory assistant
- 1959 – Female Age-Mates (Сверстницы) as Tanya
- 1971 – Dauria (Даурия) as matchmaker
- 1972 – Happy Go Lucky (Печки-лавочки) as Nyura
- 1974 – The Red Snowball Tree (Калина красная) as Lyuba Baykalova
- 1975 – They Fought for Their Country (Они сражались за Родину) as Glasha
- 1976 – Twelve Chairs (12 стульев) as Madame Gritsatsuyeva
- 1979 – Little Tragedies (Маленькие трагедии) as Ekaterina Pavlovna
- 1980 – The Youth of Peter the Great (Юность Петра) as matchmaker
- 1981 – Could One Imagine? (Вам и не снилось...) as Vera Vasilievna Lavochkina
- 1983 – Quarantine (Карантин) as circus cashier
- 1984 – Dead Souls (Мёртвые души) as Lady, just nice
- 1986 – Along the main street with orchestra (По главной улице с оркестром) as Lidiya Ivanovna
- 1987 – The Kreutzer Sonata (Крейцерова соната) as Liza's mother
- 1991 – Viva Gardes-Marines! as Ekaterina Chernysheva
