= The Wedding =

The Wedding may refer to:

== Books and plays ==
- The Wedding (Sparks novel), a 2003 romance novel by Nicholas Sparks
- The Wedding (Steel novel), a 2000 romance novel by Danielle Steel
- The Wedding!, The Amazing Spider-Man Annual #21
- Les Noces barbares (The Wedding), a 1985 novel by Yann Queffélec (winner of Prix Goncourt)
- The Wedding, a 1968 novel Dasma by Ismail Kadare
- The Wedding, a 1996 romance novel by Julie Garwood
- The Wedding, a 1995 novel by Dorothy West

=== Theatre ===
- The Wedding (1629 play), a Caroline era stage play by James Shirley
- The Wedding (1901 play) (Wesele), a Polish play by Stanisław Wyspiański
- The Wedding (Chekhov play), a play by Anton Chekhov

== Film and television ==
=== Film ===
- The Wedding (1944 film), a Russian film directed by Isidor Annensky
- The Wedding (1972 film), a Polish film directed by Andrzej Wajda
- The Wedding (2000 film), a French-Russian film directed by Pavel Lungin
- The Wedding (2004 film), a Polish film directed by Wojciech Smarzowski
- The Wedding (2018 film), an American film directed by Sam Abbas

=== Television ===
==== Series ====
- The Wedding (miniseries), a 1998 American drama miniseries
- The Wedding (TV series), a 2009 Philippine romantic comedy series

==== Episodes ====
- "The Wedding" (Diff'rent Strokes)
- "The Wedding" (Drake & Josh)
- "The Wedding" (Dynasty 1982)
- "The Wedding" (Dynasty 1983)
- "The Wedding" (Dynasty 1989)
- "The Wedding" (Full House)
- "The Wedding" (How I Met Your Mother)
- "The Wedding" (The Jeffersons)
- "The Wedding" (Kate & Allie)
- "The Wedding" (Life with Derek)
- "The Wedding" (Lucky Feller)
- "The Wedding" (Mama's Family)
- "The Wedding" (Modern Family)
- "The Wedding" (Mork & Mindy)
- "The Wedding" (Not Going Out)
- "The Wedding" (Outlander)
- "The Wedding" (Outnumbered)
- "The Wedding" (Roseanne 1991)
- "The Wedding" (Roseanne 1996)
- "The Wedding" (Snuff Box)
- "The Wedding" (Spider-Man episode)
- "The Wedding" (The Story of Tracy Beaker)
- "The Wedding" (The Upper Hand)
- "The Wedding" (The West Wing)
- "The Wedding" (What We Do in the Shadows)
- "The Wedding" (Will & Grace)

== Music ==
- Les noces (The Wedding ), a ballet by Igor Stravinsky
- The Wedding (band), an American rock band

=== Albums ===
- The Wedding Album (disambiguation)
- The Wedding (Oneida album), 2005
- The Wedding (The Wedding album), 2005

=== Songs ===
- "The Wedding", a 1958 song by June Valli.
- "The Wedding" (song), a 1964 song by Julie Rogers
- "The Wedding", a composition by South African pianist Abdullah Ibrahim

=== Other media ===
- "The Weddings", the third area of the PlayStation 3 video game LittleBigPlanet

== See also ==
- The Wedding Singer
- "The Wedding Song"
- Wedding (disambiguation)
