= Married (disambiguation) =

Married may refer to:

== Common uses ==
- Marital status, the state of being married (or otherwise legally partnered) or unmarried (divorced, widowed, or single and never married)
- Marriage, union of individuals that creates kinship
- Married pair, a set of two railroad cars or locomotives which are permanently coupled and treated as if they were a single unit, also called a twin unit

== Arts, entertainment, and media ==
- Married (radio series), BBC radio comedy with science fiction themes
- Married (TV series), American television series on FX
- "Married" (Beavis and Butt-Head), a 2023 television episode
- "Married", a 1991 episode of Get a Life (TV series)

== See also ==
- Common-law marriage
- Just Married (disambiguation)
- The Wedding (disambiguation)
- Wedding (disambiguation)
