= Konstantin Yudin =

Soviet film director

- Born: Konstantin Konstantinovich Yudin; 8 January 1896; Semyonovskoe village, Moscow Governorate, Russian Empire
- Died: 30 March 1957 (aged 61); Moscow, Soviet Union
- Resting place: Novodevichy Cemetery, Moscow
- Occupation: Film director
- Years active: 1927–1957
- Notable work: Brave People (1950); A Fortress in the Mountains (1953)
- Awards: Stalin Prize (1951)

Konstantin Konstantinovich Yudin (Russian: Константи́н Константи́нович Ю́дин; 1896–1957) was a Soviet film director.

== Biography ==
Born in the Semyonovskoe village near Dmitrov (now Dmitrovsky District, Moscow Oblast) into a Russian working-class family, one of the five children of Konstantin Ilyich Yudin, a miller who died in 1904. The kids then moved to the neighboring village to live with their grandparents. After graduating from school Yudin was brought to Moscow to work for hire. By the age of 18 he became a professional jockey working at the Moscow hippodrome. In 1917 he was suggested a place at the Pyatigorsk hippodrome. Shortly after the Russian Civil War started. Konstantin joined the Red Army and fought as part of the cavalry in the North Caucasus up till 1920, then returned to Moscow.

In 1926 he joined his brother Nikolai Yudin who was working as a cinematographer and took part in several documentaries before enrolling in the State Institute of Cinematography to study directing. After graduating in 1932 he spent seven years working as an assistant director with Grigori Aleksandrov (on Volga-Volga), Boris Yurtsev and Igor Ilyinsky.

In 1939 Yudin directed his first feature film — a comedy A Girl with a Temper about misadventures of the village girl in Moscow, with Valentina Serova in the leading role. He later invited Serova to his next movie, Hearts of Four, along with Lyudmila Tselikovskaya and Yevgeny Samoylov. A light romantic comedy about a love rectangle was finished in 1941, shortly before the Great Patriotic War, and thus put on hold up until 1945 when it was finally released to a great success (5th place in the box office with 19.4 mln viewers).

During the war Yudin developed a series of war comedies about a goofy army cook Antosha Rybkin portrayed by the acclaimed actor Boris Chirkov which gained huge popularity among soldiers. He was awarded Order of the Red Star for them in 1944. As the war ended, he directed another successful romantic comedy The Twins (also known as The Call of Love internationally) about a young girl who found and adopted two newborn twins before losing them again. It was the third collaboration between Lyudmila Tselikovskaya and Mikhail Zharov after their marriage in 1943.

1950 marked his sudden turn to the action genre as he directed two adventure films Brave People and A Fortress in the Mountains with young Sergei Gurzo in the leading roles. Both featured dangerous stunts and a lot of horse riding. Being a professional jockey, Yudin personally showed actors how to deal with horses to their great surprise, as most had no idea about his past. The movies were released to a huge success, with Brave People becoming a box office leader of 1950 with 41.2 million viewers and A Fortress in the Mountains reaching the 3rd place in 1953 with 44.8 mln viewers. The first film also brought Yudin and the crew the Stalin Prize in 1951.

He then directed two movies based on Anton Chekhov's comedy stories and an adaptation of Lev Gurych Sinichkin vaudeville by Dmitry Lensky. In 1954 he was named Honored Artist of the RSFSR. In 1957 Yudin became involved with a biographical film he had planned for a long time — The Wrestler and the Clown about Ivan Poddubny and Anatoly Durov, father of Anatoly Durov and founder of the famous circus dynasty. During the troubled shooting he saved a young actress, but was badly injured himself and died shortly after. The film was finished by Boris Barnet.

Konstantin Yudin was buried at the Novodevichy Cemetery. He was survived by his wife, a Russian actress Inna Fedorova (1905—1990). His brother Nikolai Yudin was arrested during the Great Purge of 1937, accused of counter-revolutionary activities and executed. He was rehabilitated in 1957.

== Selected filmography ==
- 1927 — Red Crimea (documentary)
- 1938 — Volga-Volga (as an assistant director)
- 1939 — A Girl with a Temper
- 1941 — Four Hearts
- 1942 — Antosha Rybkin
- 1945 — The Twins (also known as The Call of Love)
- 1950 — Brave People
- 1953 — A Fortress in the Mountains
- 1954 — The Swedish Match (also known as The Safety Match)
- 1956 — Behind the Footlights
- 1957 — The Wrestler and the Clown (finished by Boris Barnet)

== Bibliography ==
- Goble, Alan. The Complete Index to Literary Sources in Film. Walter de Gruyter, 1999.
