= Sleepless Night (1960 film) =

- Russian: Бессонная ночь
- Directed by: Isidor Annensky
- Written by: Vasiliy Solovyov
- Starring: Yury Solomin; Yevgeny Samoylov; Lyudmila Chernyshyova; Dzhemma Osmolovskaya; Margarita Volodina
- Cinematography: Valeri Ginzburg
- Music by: Oskar Feltsman
- Production company: Gorky Film Studio
- Release date: 1960
- Running time: 93 minutes
- Country: Soviet Union
- Language: Russian

Sleepless Night (Russian: Бессонная ночь) is a 1960 Soviet drama film directed by Isidor Annensky.

== Plot ==
The film tells about the engineer who goes to Sibersk, where he becomes the head of a group of crane operators. He quickly masters a new job. And suddenly the city is visited by the bride of an engineer who works as an architect.

== Cast ==
- Yury Solomin as Pavel Kaurov, young engineer
- Yevgeny Samoylov as Pavel's father
- Lyudmila Chernyshyova as Pavel's mother
- Dzhemma Osmolovskaya as Annushka, Pavel's old flame
- Margarita Volodina as Pavel's current fiancee
- Aleksandr Grave as Petunin, Nina's former classmate
- Luiza Koshukova as Petunin's sister (as L. Koshukova)
- Alexey Gribov as Pyotr Batavin (as A. Gribov)
- Gennadi Karnovich-Valua as Zubkov
