= The Horizon (film) =

- Russian: Горизонт
- Directed by: Iosif Kheifits
- Written by: Grigory Baklanov
- Produced by: Alexander Arshansky
- Starring: Yuri Tolubeyev; Boris Chirkov; Aleksandr Safonov; Svetlana Melkova; Lyudmila Dolgorukova
- Cinematography: Vadim Derbenyov; Viktor Karasyov; Alexander Chirov
- Music by: Nadezhda Simonyan
- Production company: Lenfilm
- Release date: 1961
- Running time: 108 min.
- Country: Soviet Union
- Language: Russian

The Horizon (Russian: Горизонт, romanized: Gorizont) is a 1961 Soviet drama film directed by Iosif Kheifits.

== Plot ==
The film tells about a group of young guys who go to the virgin lands, start working there and create favorable conditions for future virgin soil.

== Cast ==
- Yuri Tolubeyev as Andrey Ivanovich Golovanov, director of the virgin state farm
- Boris Chirkov as Likhobaba, deputy director of the virgin state farm
- Aleksandr Safonov as Sergey Novoskoltsev
- Svetlana Melkova as Rimma
- Lyudmila Dolgorukova as Masha
- Valery Nosik as Misha
- Geliy Sysoev as Slava
- Mariya Lvova as Dusya
- Sergei Gurzo as truck driver
- Vyacheslav Podvig as Zhenya
- Irina Gubanova as Vera
- Tatyana Doronina as Klava, state farm woman
- Maya Bulgakova as Shura
- Leonid Bykov as foreman of the virgin state farm

Lyrics: Bulat Okudzhava
