= Bezhin Meadow =

1937 film by Sergei Eisenstein

- Directed by: Sergei Eisenstein
- Written by: Isaac Babel; Sergei M. Eisenstein; Aleksandr Rzheshevsky
- Story by: Ivan Turgenev
- Produced by: V. Ya. Babitsky
- Starring: Vitya Kartashov; Nikolai Khmelyov; Pavel Ardzhanov; Yekaterina Teleshova; Erast Garin; Nikolai Maslov; Boris Zakhava
- Cinematography: Vladimir Nilsen; Eduard Tisse
- Edited by: Klavdya Alyeva
- Music by: Gavriil Popov; Sergei Prokofiev (reconstructed music)
- Production company: Gosudarstvennoe Upravlenie Kinematografii
- Distributed by: Mosfilm
- Release date: 1937
- Running time: 30 minutes
- Country: Soviet Union
- Language: Russian
- Budget: ₱2 million

Bezhin Meadow (Бежин луг, Bezhin lug) is a 1937 Soviet propaganda film, famous for having been suppressed and believed destroyed before its completion. Directed by Sergei Eisenstein, it tells the story of a young farm boy whose father attempts to betray the government for political reasons by sabotaging the year's harvest and the son's efforts to stop his own father to protect the Soviet state, culminating in the boy's murder and a social uprising. The film draws its title from a story with the same name from the cycle A Sportsman's Sketches by Ivan Turgenev, but is based on the (largely fabricated) life story of Pavlik Morozov, a young Russian boy who became a political martyr following his death in 1932, after he supposedly denounced his father to Soviet government authorities and subsequently died at the hands of his family. Pavlik Morozov was immortalized in school programs, poetry, music, and film.

Commissioned by a communist youth group, the film's production ran from 1935 to 1937, until it was halted by the central Soviet government, which said it contained artistic, social, and political failures. Some, however, blamed the failure of Bezhin Meadow on government interference and policies, extending all the way to Joseph Stalin himself. In the wake of the film's failure, Eisenstein publicly recanted his work as an error. Individuals were arrested during and after the ensuing debacle.

Bezhin Meadow was long thought lost in the wake of World War II bombings. In the 1960s, however, cuttings and partial prints of the film were found; from these, a reconstruction of Bezhin Meadow, based on the original script, was undertaken. Rich in religious symbolism, the film and its history became the focus of academic study. The film was extensively discussed both inside and outside of the film industry for its historical nature, the odd circumstances of its production and failure, and its imagery, which is considered some of the greatest in cinema. In spite of the failure of Bezhin Meadow, Eisenstein rebounded to win Soviet acclaim and awards, and became artistic director of a major film studio.

== Plot ==
Because Bezhin Meadow was repeatedly edited, re-shot, and changed to satisfy the Soviet government authorities, several versions of the film were created.

The most sourced and best-known version focuses on Stepok, a young boy in a collective farming village, who is a member of the local Young Pioneers organization, as are other local children. His father Samokhin, a farmer, plans to sabotage the village harvest for political reasons by burning down the titular meadow, but Stepok organizes the other Young Pioneer children to guard the crops. Samokhin grows progressively more frustrated by his son's actions and success. Eventually, Stepok reports Samokhin's crimes to the Soviet government authorities, and is in turn slain by his own father for betraying his family. The other Young Pioneers break into the local church, singing songs, and desecrate it in response to Stepok's death. The visuals of the film shift during the destruction of the church, with the villagers becoming that which they are destroying—the angry villagers, by the end of the set piece, are depicted as Christ-like, angelic, and prophetic figures.

A later re-editing of the film opens with images of orchards and blue sky, showing a stone obelisk with Turgenev's name on it. It is next revealed that Stepok's mother has been beaten to death by his father. In a dark hut, Samokhin complains that his son has a greater loyalty to the Soviet than his own family, as Stepok enters from the bright day outside. His father quotes from the Bible: "If the son betrays his father, kill him like a dog!" Samokhin is arrested for arson, and Stepok leaves with a Communist functionary. The other arsonists take refuge in the local church, and are soon arrested. The arsonists are nearly lynched, but are saved from the villagers' wrath by Stepok. The villagers transform the church into a clubhouse, symbolically ridiculing religion or the clergy.

In some versions, the destruction of the church was replaced with a scene of villagers fighting the arsonist's fire. In the film, the fire was started when the arsonists threw dried sunflowers and lit matches into the community's fuel storage area. In some cuts, Stepok overhears his father's planning and sneaks out in the night to inform on him; in others, the local Communist Party functionary breastfeeds Stepok's young sister; in still others, Stepok's father says after shooting his son, "They took you from me, but I did not give you to them. I did not give my own flesh and blood." After Stepok's death, the same aforementioned Communist official carries him off, joined by other children, in a funeral march that was said to evolve into a victory march.

The film, as mentioned by Shumyatsky and Eisenstein, is rich in religious iconography and the symbolic struggle between good and evil. Additionally, Birgit Beumers writes, "The peasants here are grey-bearded prophets; the young men are broad-shouldered Renaissance apostles; the fleshy girls are earthly Madonnas; the peasant wrecking the iconostasis is a biblical Samson; the chubby young boy in the shirt, raised high under the cupola towards the slanting sun-ray which turns his locks golden, is the young Jesus Christ ascending to the Heavenly Throne." Bezhin Meadow, in its various unreleased versions, was "Dedicated to the bright memory of Pavlik Morozov, a small hero of our time" (cf. A Hero of Our Time).

== Cast ==
- Viktor Kartashov as Stepok (as Vitya Kartashov)
- Nikolay Khmelyov as Peasant
- Boris Zakhava as Stepka's father - first film version
- Yekaterina Teleshova
- Pyotr Arzhanov as Political Commissar (as Pavel Ardzhanov)
- Nikolai Maslov
- Yakov Zajtsev
- Vadim Gusev
- Serafim Kozminskiy
- Stanislav Rostotsky as Boy
- Sergey Averkiyev as Appearing

== Original Turgenev story and Pavlik Morozov ==
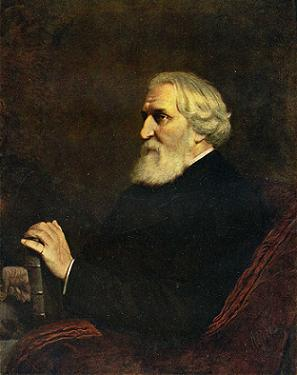
Ivan Turgenev, 1872

The film was based in part on a story by Ivan Turgenev, a 19th-century Russian scholar and novelist, but was adapted to incorporate the folk story of Pavlik Morozov, a supposed Young Pioneer glorified by Soviet Union propaganda as a martyr. Turgenev's original short fiction titled "Bezhin Meadow" or "Bezhin Lea" was a story about peasant boys in the 1850s, in the Oryol region, discussing supernatural signs of death, while they spend the night in the Bezhin Meadow with a lost hunter. It is a part of A Sportsman's Sketches, a collection of short stories. Eisenstein would later remove any direct references to Turgenev's fiction, aside from the title, from the film.

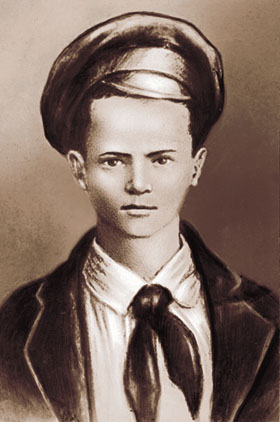
Pavlik Morozov, 1932

Morozov's life and death in the village of Gerasimovka in the Ural Mountains, has no connection with Turgenev's literary work. Morozov was a 13-year-old boy who denounced his father, a kulak, to the Soviet government authorities, and was in turn killed by his family. It was a Soviet morality tale: opposing the state was selfish and reactionary, and the state was more important than family. The most popular account of the Morozov story is as follows: born to poor peasants in Gerasimovka, a small village 350 kilometres (220 mi) north-east of Sverdlovsk, Morozov was a dedicated communist who led the Young Pioneers at his school, and supported Stalin's collectivization of farms. In 1932, at age 13, Morozov reported his father to the political police (GPU). Morozov's father, the Chairman of the Village Soviet or Selsoviet, was alleged to have been "forging documents and selling them to the bandits and enemies of the Soviet State" (as his sentence read). The elder Morozov, Trofim, was sentenced to 10 years in a labor camp, and later executed. However, Pavlik's family did not approve of the young boy's actions. On September 3 of that year, his uncle, grandfather, grandmother and a cousin murdered him, along with his younger brother. All of them except the uncle were rounded up by the GPU, convicted, and sentenced to "the highest measure of social defense", execution by a firing squad.

The Morozov story was developed into compulsory children's readings, songs, plays, a symphonic poem, a full-length opera and six biographies. There is very little original evidence related to the story; much of it is hearsay provided by second-hand witnesses. In Bezhin Meadow, the child is named Stepok, departing from the original historical lore and information. Among the ironies of Bezhin Meadow's history were that Pavlik Morozov may not have even been a member of the Young Pioneers. Morozov had been called a "disturbed young boy" who was unaware of the consequences of what he was doing and turned his father in to the authorities for having abandoned his mother for a younger woman, rather than for political reasons.

== Production ==
Herbert Marshall argued that by 1931, government interference in Soviet artistic work was already well established, in various forms: from peers of the artists, guided by 'above'; from "the different circles competent to judge it"; and ultimately from the Communist Party and Stalin himself. This all led to the failed production of Bezhin Meadow.

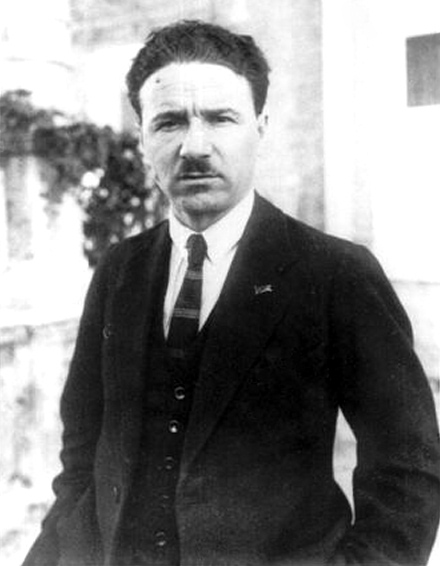
Boris Shumyatsky, 1924

Before production of the film began, the script by Aleksandr Rzheshevsky was well received by Eisenstein, but there were initial concerns about the quality of the plot and characterization involved. The commission for the production was issued by the Communist Youth League, or Komsomol, to honor their efforts in supporting collective farm work, and was to focus on "the socialist reconstruction of the countryside". Filming began in the middle of 1935, and in October 1935 the first developed film was presented to the Mosfilm Studio, which was producing Bezhin Meadow. The studio requested changes, and production continued. In August 1936, with most of the principal filming done, Boris Shumyatsky, the then-head of the Soviet GUK (Principal Directorate for the Cinema) ordered a halt in production and directed that the film be re-written. The script was again revised, with Eisenstein acknowledging errors in his production after a further version was rejected by the studio. During the creation of Bezhin Meadow, Eisenstein did not widely screen footage of the film for review.

Production on the unreleased film cost 2 million rubles, and spanned two years. When casting the production, Eisenstein had preferred to not use professional actors, instead using people who represented "types" to play a given role. Two thousand young boys were auditioned during the search for the ideal young actor to play the part of Stepok, the renamed Morozov character. Filming took place in many locations, primarily in Moscow studios, and remote locations in Ukraine and the Caucasus. During production, Eisenstein had the foresight to save the edited-out frames from every shot in the film, which allowed for the later reconstruction of Bezhin Meadows in the 1960s, even though the original prints were destroyed.

The Central Executive Committee of the Communist Party required that it screen and approve Bezhin Meadow before its release. Multiple versions of the film were banned by the committee, which cited them as "inartistic and politically bankrupt", and claimed that Eisenstein "confused the class struggle with the struggle between good and evil". By an order from the Chief Directorate of Soviet Cinema, production of the film was stopped permanently on March 17, 1937. Shumyatsky complained that Eisenstein had presented the conflicts of the film in somewhat Biblical terms, rather than placing the conflicts of the film in the context of the socialist class struggle. Eisenstein himself would later say that the murder of Stepok by his father was "reminiscent of Abraham's sacrifice of Isaac".

After the film's final rejection, Shumyatsky took responsibility for the failure in the Soviet media, with an essay detailing the film's history in Pravda. According to Shumyatsky, Bezhin Meadow was a slander against the Soviet countryside, and an example of Formalism that needed to be eliminated. Shumyatsky went on to say, "[Eisenstein was] making Bezhin Meadow only because it offered him an opportunity to indulge in formalistic exercises. Instead of creating a strong, clear, direct work, Eisenstein detached his work from reality, from the colors and heroism of reality. He consciously reduced the work's ideological content." Shumyatsky would lose his government position two years later, when he was charged with being an English spy, arrested, and shot. One of the reasons Shumyatsky gave for shutting down production of Bezhin Meadow was that Eisenstein was wasting money and resources in producing it; conversely, before his execution, Shumyatsky himself was charged with wasting money and resources by cancelling films such as Bezhin Meadow. The suppression of Bezhin Meadow was also said to be part of an ongoing campaign against the artistic avant-garde in Joseph Stalin's Russia.

Following the order to stop production of the film from the Soviet government and Shumyatsky, Eisenstein contracted smallpox, followed afterwards by influenza, and the film was destined to remain unfinished. He worked further on the story with the Soviet author Isaac Babel, but no material was ever published or released from their collaboration, and the production of Bezhin Meadow came to an end. The unfinished and unreleased film reels were destroyed during a World War II bombing raid in 1941. In a later published response to Shumyatsky titled "The Mistakes of Bezhin Meadow", Eisenstein pledged he would "rid myself of the last anarchistic traits of individualism in my outlook and creative method". Eisenstein finally wrote, "What caused catastrophe to overtake the picture I had worked on for two years? What was the mistaken viewpoint which, despite honesty of feelings and devotion to work, brought the production to a perversion of reality, making it politically insubstantial and consequently inartistic?"

== Reactions and legacy ==
Eisenstein's Bezhin Meadow has had a rich legacy of responses and criticism since its original production. In the wake of Shumyatsky's statements in Pravda, which diminished Eisenstein's reputation in the Soviet Union to the lowest point in his career, others soon weighed in. Some criticism of the film was that it was too abstract or formalist, echoing Shumyatsky's views. Ilya Vaisfeld called the film and Eisenstein's methods "profoundly hostile to socialism", and faulted Eisenstein for presenting enemies in a possibly favorable light. According to Nikolai Otten, Eisenstein's failure was due to filming an emotional scenario, thinking it freed him from studio control. Boris Babitsky, the chief of Mosfilm Studio (the producers of the film), took responsibility for the production's failure, and for not controlling Eisenstein's work or halting filming earlier; Babitsky was later arrested for this. Ivan Pyryev felt that Eisenstein did not want to be a "Soviet person", giving this as a reason for the failure of the film. David Maryan, another director, blamed Eisenstein for looking down on others, taking no pleasure in the achievements of others, and for being a loner. Eisenstein's political status came under attack as well due to the film. G. Zeldovich, of the Principal Directorate for the Cinema, questioned whether Eisenstein should be free to work with film students due to his political unreliability.

Not all of the commentary and examination of Bezhin Meadow was overtly negative, however. In the years after the film closed its production, studios and film organizations in major Soviet cities including Moscow, Leningrad, and Kiev held seminars to examine the lessons of the film, with some of the sessions lasting days. A former student of Eisenstein, Peotr Pavlenko, defended Eisenstein's work in the wake of Bezhin Meadow. Grigori Alexandrov, a filmmaker Eisenstein had worked with previously, was denounced for "raising himself above the community" because he did not speak out against his associate. Esfir Shub suggested that as Eisenstein was not present in the USSR during the first five-year plan, he was unable to correctly present modern political lessons. The set-piece in Bezhin Meadow where the villagers desecrate the village church in response to Stepok's death, which was removed in later versions of the film, has been called "one of the great set-pieces in cinema", and a further demonstration of the Biblical imagery featured in the film. Among such visuals from the desecration sequence were an image of a girl in a mirror, framed as the Virgin Mary, and a statue of a crucified Christ held as if it were in a pietà. Ivor Montagu likened Eisenstein's struggles with the film to Galileo's conflict with the Inquisition. In spite of the heavy criticisms he faced, Eisenstein was allowed by the politburo to continue his career, and he created and released the film Alexander Nevsky in 1938.

In the 1960s, it was learned that Eisenstein's wife, Pera Attasheva, had saved splices of film from the editing table that was used for Bezhin Meadow. Starting in 1964, a reconstruction of the film was created and set to a musical score by Sergei Prokofiev by Russian film director Sergei Yutkevich with Eisenstein scholar Naum Kleiman. The film was edited to the original script, to preserve the original cutting continuity; new intertitles were also created from the script, and a new spoken introduction was added. The film now exists as a 35-minute "silent film slide show". In 1988, the filming of Bezhin Meadow was the focus of a retrospective at the Tisch School of the Arts in New York City. Entitled "Jay Leyda: A Life's Work", it focused on Leyda, a professor at the school and the lone American to have studied with Eisenstein at the Moscow State Film Institute; Leyda had been apprentice director and still photographer on the set. Of the Soviet films from the 1920s and 1930s, Bezhin Meadow is the one that may be most cited in academic works related to film study.

Though production of Bezhin Meadow was never completed, and a full version was never distributed, the film was later considered a celebration of Soviet political purposes and informants. In spite of the problems that Bezhin Meadow faced, Eisenstein would receive the Order of Lenin in 1939 due to the wild success of Alexander Nevsky. In 1941, he became the artistic director of Mosfilm Studios.

== See also ==
- 1930s in film
- Cinema of the Russian Empire
- Cinema of the Soviet Union
- List of lost films
- Russian culture
- Soviet art
