= Irina Murzaeva =

Soviet actress (1906–1988)

- Born: Irina Vsevolodovna Murzaeva; May 15, 1906; Krasnoufimsk, Krasnoufimsky Uyezd, Perm Governorate, Russian Empire
- Died: January 3, 1988 (aged 81); Moscow, USSR
- Occupation: actress
- Years active: 1927–1988
- Awards: Medal For Labour Valour

Irina Vsevolodovna Murzaeva (Russian: Ири́на Все́володовна Мурза́ева; May 15, 1906 — January 3, 1988) was a Soviet actress of theater and cinema.

== Biography ==
She graduated from the Lunacharsky Theater College (1927). In 1927–1928 and 1930–1931, she was an actress Sverdlovsk Youth Theater, in 1928–1937 she worked at Ruben Simonov's theater studio, in 1937–1956 she was an actress and director of Moscow Lenkom Theatre.

In the movie, she made her debut in the film Four Hearts by Konstantin Yudin. She was repeatedly shot in the newsreels Yeralash and Fitil.

One of the most popular comic old women of Soviet cinema.

She died on January 3, 1988, in Moscow at the age of 82. Buried in Moscow in the Don Cemetery.

== Personal life ==
Son Boris Nikolayevich Murzaev (1938), who was brought up alone; grandson Igor Murzaev (1975), granddaughter Yekaterina Lazareva (1968), great-grandsons Boris (1999), Tamara (1999), Mikhail (2002).

== Selected filmography ==
- Four Hearts (1941) as Tamara Spiridonovna, manicurist
- The Wedding (1944) as guest
- The Call of Love (1944) as Alla Vladimirovna Broshkina
- The Anna Cross (1954) as Mavra Grigorievna
- The Snow Queen (1957) as old fairy (voice)
- Ekaterina Voronina (1957) as Kaleria Ivanovna
- The Girl Without an Address (1957) as conductor
- A Simple Story (1960) as Sasha's mother
- The Night Before Christmas (1961) as deaconess
- Children of Don Quixote (1966) as old woman
- Torrents of Steel (1967) as Gorpina
- Fire, Water, and Brass Pipes (1968) as 2nd guest at the wedding
- Shine, Shine, My Star (1970) as Tapera
- The Twelve Chairs (1971) as guide
- Grandads-Robbers (1972) as the museum keeper
- Northern Rhapsody (1974) as hockey fan
- Practical Joke (1977) as neighbor Fira Solomonovna
- Incognito from St. Petersburg (1978) as elderly lady
- There Was a Piano-Tuner... (1979) as Lena's neighbor
- Investigation Held by ZnaToKi (1987) as Tatyana Grigoryevna
