= Four Hearts (1941 film) =

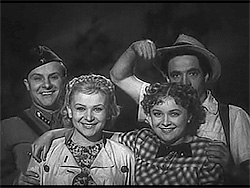
- Russian: Сердца четырёх
- Directed by: Konstantin Yudin
- Written by: Aleksei Fajko; Anatoli Granberg
- Produced by: P. Pashkov
- Starring: Valentina Serova; Yevgeny Samoylov; Lyudmila Tselikovskaya; Pavel Shpringfeld; Lisa Dmitriyevskaya; Irina Murzaeva
- Cinematography: Nikolai Vlasov
- Edited by: Grigori Shirokov
- Music by: Yuri Milyutin
- Production company: Mosfilm
- Release date: 1941
- Running time: 94 min.
- Country: Soviet Union
- Language: Russian

Four Hearts (Russian: Сердца четырёх, romanized: Serdtsa chetyryokh) is a 1941 Soviet romantic comedy film directed by Konstantin Yudin.

== Plot ==
In the suburban dacha settlement, a regiment of tankers has been quartered. The plot is built around two sisters, absolutely different, but equally loving. One is a serious mathematician, the other is a frivolous dragonfly. In the center of attention of the girls is a brave military man. Life vicissitudes, funny and difficult situations, intrigue, tears, joy, but everything is built around one love.

== Cast ==
- Valentina Serova as Galina Sergeyevna Murashova
- Yevgeny Samoylov as First Lieutenant Pyotr Nikitich Kolchin
- Lyudmila Tselikovskaya as Alexandra Sergeyevna 'Shura' Murashova
- Pavel Shpringfeld as Gleb Zavartsev
- Lisa Dmitriyevskaya as Antonia Vasiliyevna Murasheva, mother
- Irina Murzaeva as Tamara Spiridonovna, manicurist
- Andrey Tutyshkin as Prof. Arkadi Vassiliyevich Yershov
- Aleksandr Antonov as Colonel
- Tatyana Barysheva as Zhurkevich, professor's aide
- Vsevolod Sanayev as Young soldier writing love letters
- Emmanuil Geller as Passenger
- Rostislav Plyatt as Examining professor
- Tatyana Govorkova as Station Master (uncredited)

== Release ==
In 1945, the film appeared on the screen and took the 5th place on the annual list of Soviet rental leaders with 19.44 million viewers.
