= The Man in the Case (film) =

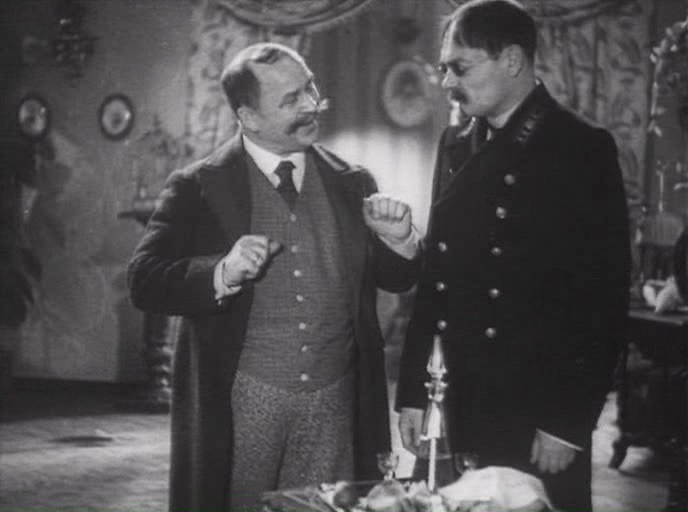
- Vladimir Voronov as Superintendent and Nikolay Khmelyov as Belikov
- Russian: Человек в футляре
- Directed by: Isidor Annensky
- Written by: Isidor Annensky; Anton Chekhov
- Starring: Nikolay Khmelyov; Mikhail Zharov; Olga Androvskaya; Vladimir Gardin; Vladimir Voronov
- Cinematography: Yevgeni Shapiro
- Music by: Aleksandr Golubentsev
- Release date: 1939
- Running time: 91 min.
- Country: Soviet Union
- Language: Russian

Film "Man in a Shell", in Russian, 1939

The Man in the Case (Russian: Человек в футляре, romanized: Chelovek v futlyare) is a 1939 Soviet drama film directed by Isidor Annensky. This film is based on the short story "The Man in the Case" written by Anton Chekhov in 1898.

== Plot ==
The film tells about the teacher of the Greek language Belikov, who works in a rural gymnasium. He is afraid of everything, prefers to store things in a shell and himself as if he lives in him, which strains the gymnasium and the people who live in the village. Suddenly the village visits Varvara, in which Belikov falls in love.

== Cast ==
- Nikolay Khmelyov as Belikov
- Mikhail Zharov as Mikhail Kovalenko
- Olga Androvskaya as Varvara Kovalenko
- Vladimir Gardin as School Principal
- Vladimir Voronov as Superintendent
- Osip Abdulov as Tarantulov
- Aleksandr Larikov as Nevyrazimov
- Konstantin Adashevsky as Clergyman
- Aleksey Bondi as French Teacher
- Aleksey Gribov as Servant Afanasiy
- Nikandr Baronov as Doctor
- Faina Ranevskaya as Superintendent's Wife
- Sabina Lukovskaya as Nevyrazimov's Wife
- Oleg Lipkin as Pupil Neverov
- Pyotr Gofman as Flowers Vendor (uncredited)
- Aleksandra Matveeva as Flowers Vendor (uncredited)
- Ivan Pelttser as Guest (uncredited)
