= Boris Zakhava =

Soviet and Russian actor and theatre director

- Born: Boris Yevgenyevich Zakhava; May 24, 1896; Pavlograd, Yekaterinoslav Governorate, Russian Empire
- Died: November 12, 1976 (aged 80); Moscow, Soviet Union
- Occupations: Actor, theater director and pedagogue

Boris Yevgenyevich Zakhava (Russian: Борис Евгеньевич Захава; May 24, 1896 – November 12, 1976) was a Soviet and Russian actor, theater director, pedagogue and theater theorist. People's Artist of the USSR (1967).

== Biography ==
He was born on May 24, 1896, in Pavlograd, Russian Empire. Yevgeny Zakhava, his father, was a graduate of Moscow Imperial Cadet School and was an officer in the Imperial Russian Army. Boris, like his father, graduated the 3rd Moscow Imperial Cadet School (1913). While being a cadet, he was acting in amateur performances. In the meantime he was involved in the centennial celebration of the victory over Napoleon in 1912, in Moscow.

Zakhava studied in the acting class of Vsevolod Meyerhold (1913–1916) and acting at the Moscow Vakhtangov studio under Yevgeny Vakhtangov. Since he was being hired by Vakhtangov as an actor, Zakhava worked at his theatre (Vakhtangov Theatre) for his entire life. In 1922 he performed as a Timur in Carlo Gozzi's Turandot. Zakhava was a teaching director at the acting studio (1925) and a leading director of Vakhtangov Theatre Company. He produced and directed Maxim Gorky's dramas, Yegor Bulychev and Others (1932, 1951) and Dostegayev and Others (1933, 1934). Since 1939 he became a director of the Shchukin Theatrical School (f. Vakhtangov acting studio). In 1958 Zakhava directed William Shakespeare's Hamlet starring Mikhail Astangov in the main role.

His most notable film appearance is as Russian field marshal Mikhail Kutuzov in the Oscar-winning film War and Peace.

He died on November 12, 1976, in Moscow and was buried at Novodevichy Cemetery in Moscow.

== Filmography ==
Year	Title	Role	Notes
1937	Bezhin Meadow	Father Stepka	Short
1965–1967	War and Peace	Mikhail Kutuzov	

== Awards and honors ==
- Medal "For Valiant Labour in the Great Patriotic War 1941–1945"
- Medal "In Commemoration of the 800th Anniversary of Moscow"
- Order of the Badge of Honour
- Order of Friendship of Peoples
- Order of the Red Banner of Labour (May 29, 1946)
- People's Artist of the RSFSR (1946)
- Stalin Prize (1952) – for production of the play Yegor Bulychyov and Others by Maxim Gorky
- People's Artist of the USSR (1967)

== Works ==
- Zakhava, Boris (1930). "Vakhtangov i ego studiia".

== See also ==
- Vsevolod Meyerhold State Theatre
