= Late Meeting =

- Written by: Yuri Nagibin
- Directed by: Vladimir Shredel
- Starring: Alexey Batalov; Larisa Luppian; Margarita Volodina; Tatyana Dogileva
- Music by: Eduard Bogushevsky
- Country of origin: Soviet Union
- Original language: Russian

Production
- Producer: Lydia Slepneva
- Cinematography: Victor Osennikov
- Running time: 78 min
- Production companies: Sverdlovsk Film Studio; Television in the Soviet Union

Original release
- Release: 24 April 1979

Late Meeting (Russian: Поздняя встреча, romanized: Pozdnyaya vstrecha) is a 1979 romantic drama television film based on the novel Urgently Required Gray human hair by Yuri Nagibin.

== Plot ==
The film takes place in Leningrad and Sverdlovsk across two time periods, 1970 and 1978. Sergey Gushchin, an aviation engineer from Sverdlovsk, travels to Leningrad to reconnect with his war comrade, Pyotr Sviridonsky. However, his trip also has a more personal purpose: years ago, he met a young actress, Natasha Proskurova, who changed his life and whom he has never been able to forget. Gushchin’s journey through Leningrad brings back memories of their first meeting on a film set, where he worked as a consultant. After noticing a quirky sign seeking "gray human hair," he exchanges playful remarks with Natasha, who soon captures his interest. They bond as she shows him around the city, and he, in turn, introduces her to his own hidden landmarks, including the spot where his friend, Andrey, lost his life in the war. Throughout their time together, Gushchin reflects on the past, revisiting memories that have deeply marked him.

As their connection deepens, they share poignant experiences, such as reuniting a lost dog with its elderly owner, who gifts them a print of a ship that Natasha loves. However, as Gushchin’s trip nears its end, the barriers of reality set in. Returning to his family in Sverdlovsk, he immerses himself in work, even taking on a life-threatening experiment to distract himself, yet they exchange telegrams that reignite his feelings. He contemplates leaving his family for Natasha but ultimately chooses not to, unwilling to hurt his wife and daughter. By 1978, at a reunion in Leningrad, Gushchin learns from Pyotr Basalaev, an artist friend, that Natasha left for Khabarovsk five years earlier, having given up on his return. Meanwhile, Gushchin’s wife, sensing his emotional distance, suffers quietly, realizing she has taken him for granted. In a final scene, she watches him leave with tear-filled eyes, hinting at the love and pain lingering between them.

== Cast ==
- Alexey Batalov as Sergey Ivanovich Gushchin
- Margarita Volodina as Masha, Gushin's wife
- Tatyana Dogileva as daughter
- Larisa Luppian as Natasha Proskurova
- Mikhail Gluzsky as Pyotr Sviridonsky
- Vladimir Tatosov as Vasily Mikhailovich Belyakov, painter
- Sergey Filippov as Sergey, an actor at the studio
