= Ekaterina Voronina (film) =

- Russian: Екатерина Воронина
- Directed by: Isidor Annensky
- Written by: Anatoli Rybakov
- Produced by: Lev Durasov
- Starring: Lyudmila Khityaeva; Sergey Bobrov; Vera Pashennaya; Nadir Malishevsky; Ariadna Shengelaia
- Cinematography: Igor Shatrov
- Edited by: Ksenia Blinova
- Music by: Lev Shvarts
- Production company: Gorky Film Studio
- Release date: May 18, 1957
- Running time: 97 min
- Country: Soviet Union
- Language: Russian

Ekaterina Voronina (Russian: Екатерина Воронина) is a 1957 Soviet romantic drama film directed by Isidor Annensky.

== Plot ==
Katya Voronina, devoid of maternal upbringing, grew into an uncompromising girl. At the beginning of the war, she voluntarily went to work at the hospital. After the war, she received an education and became an engineer and the head of the river port, but she did not have a relationship with the head of the shipping company. And so, he is fired, and Katya realizes that he was her closest person.

== Cast ==
- Lyudmila Khityaeva as Ekaterina Voronina
- Sergey Bobrov as Voronin
- Vera Pashennaya as Grandmother
- Nadir Malishevsky as Lednyov
- Ariadna Shengelaya as Irina
- Vadim Medvedev as Mostovoy
- Mikhail Ulyanov as Sutyrin
- Nonna Mordyukova as Dusya Oshurkova
- Aleksandr Sashin-Nikolsky as Yevgeni Samojlovich
- Yury Puzyryov as Zhenya Kulagin
- Yury Kireev as Nikolay
- Ye. Kudryavtseva as Klara
- Ivan Kuznetsov as Maksim Petrovich
- Irina Murzaeva as Kaleria Ivanovna

== Release ==
Isidor Annensky's film was watched by 27.8 million Soviet viewers, which is 473 results for the entire history of Soviet cinematography.
