= Irina Gubanova =

Russian ballerina and film actress

- Ирина Губанова
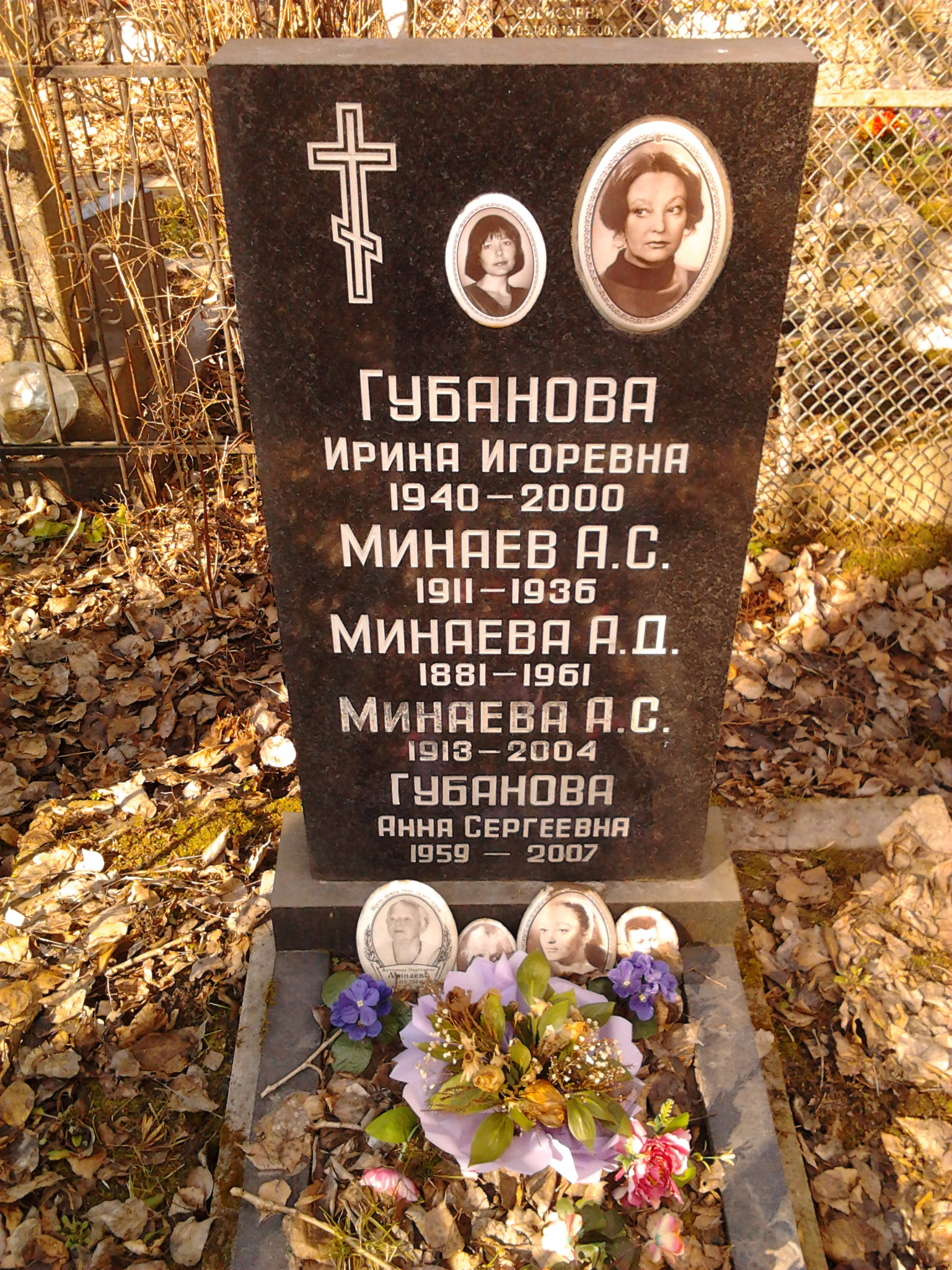
- Born: 3 March 1940; Leningrad, Soviet Union
- Died: 15 April 2000 (aged 60); Moscow, Russia
- Occupation: Actress
- Years active: 1960-1992 (film)

Irina Igorevna Gubanova (Russian: Ири́на И́горевна Губа́нова; 3 March 1940 – 15 April 2000) was a Russian ballerina and film actress. She was married to the actor Sergei Gurzo.

== Selected filmography ==
- The Girl Without an Address (1958)
- The Queen of Spades (1960) as Polina
- Man Follows the Sun (1962) as episode
- The Horizon (1962) as Vera
- 713 Requests Permission to Land (1962) as young wife, American passenger
- A Trip Without a Load (1963) as doctor (uncredited)
- The First Trolleybus (1963) as Sveta Soboleva
- I Accept the Fight (1963) as Tamara
- Where Are You Now, Maxim? (1965) as Alka
- War and Peace (1965-1967, part 1-4) as Sonia Rostova
- The Green Carriage (1967) as Masha Dontsova
- The Snow Queen (1967) as Princess Elsa
- Virineya (1969) as Antonina
- The Snow Maiden (1969) as Kupava
- The Beginning (1970) as episode (uncredited)
- Dreams of Love – Liszt (1970) as Olga Janina
- Every Evening After Work (1974) as Ellochka
- Heavenly Swallows (1976) as Caroline
- Stepan's Remembrance (1977) as Nastya Yegorovna, wife of Stepan
- A Day to Think (1980) as episode
- Woman in White (1981) as Countess Fosco
- Sicilian Defense (1981) as Yanina Stanislavovna Gronskaya (Museum expert)
- Women joke Seriously (1981) as episode
- The Eighth Wonder of the World (1982) as Chernova
- Private Life (1982) as Nelli Petrovna
- Az élet muzsikája - Kálmán Imre (1984) as nurse
- Through all the Years (1985) as episode
- Battle of Moscow (1985, TV Series) as Mother of Zoya Kosmodemyanskaya
- Complicity in Murder (1985) as Mrs. Summers
- Podróze pana Kleksa (1986) as Queen Banyaluka
- Face to Face (1987) as Jaquelin
- Horse Riders (1987) as episode (segment "Theorist")
- The Blackmailer (1988) as Principal
- Cyrano de Bergerac (1989) as The Duenna
- Homo Novus (1990) as school principal
- Shop "Rubinchik and ..." (1992) as homeless lady (final film role)

== Bibliography ==
- Peter Cowie / Derek Elley. World Filmography: 1967. Fairleigh Dickinson University Press, 1977.
