= Vladimir Tatosov =

Russian actor (1926–2021)

- Tatosov in 1966
- Born: Vladimir Mikhailovich Tatosov; 10 May 1926; Moscow, RSFSR, USSR
- Died: 24 December 2021 (aged 95); Saint Petersburg, Russia
- Occupation: actor
- Years active: 1946–2021

Vladimir Mikhailovich Tatosov (Russian: Влади́мир Миха́йлович Тато́сов; 10 May 1926 – 24 December 2021) was a Russian stage, television, voice and film actor. He had an honorary title, People's Artist of the RSFSR (1991).

== Biography ==
Tatosov was born on 10 May 1926, in Moscow, into an Armenian family. He spent his childhood in Baku.

In 1946, he graduated from the drama school at the Sverdlovsk Drama Theater. In 1947, he was admitted to the troupe of the Saint Petersburg Comedy Theatre. After a while, he moved to Lenin's Komsomol Theatre. In 1963, he became an artist of the Gorky Bolshoi Drama Theater. In 1971, he moved to the Lenfilm film studio.

He performed a lot in the variety, and for one year he worked together with Arkady Raikin.

In 2005, Tatosov published his autobiographical book And I Want to Fly.

A few days before his death, Tatosov was admitted to a hospital in Saint Petersburg with cancer. Soon, he was transferred to another hospital, where he contracted COVID-19. Tatosov died from COVID-19 on 24 December 2021, at the age of 95.

== Selected filmography ==
=== Actor ===
- A Big Family (1954) as a photojournalist
- October Days (1958) as Abram Gots
- Road to the Stage (1963) as Khachyan, assistant director
- The Salvos of the Aurora Cruiser (1965) as Yakov Sverdlov
- Tatyana's Day (1967) as Yakov Sverdlov
- Intervention (1968) as Imertsaki, a card-sharper
- The Sixth of July (1968) as Yakov Sverdlov
- Mission in Kabul (1970) as Secretary of the Embassy of Afghanistan
- Hail, Mary! (1970) as Ignacio Mures
- Grandmaster (1973) as Sergey Aleksandrovich
- Failure of Engineer Garin (1973) as Tyklinski
- Ksenia, Fedor's Beloved Wife (1974) as Kondratyev
- The Straw Hat (1974) as Felix, Fadinar's servant
- Trust (1976) as Yakov Sverdlov
- Love at First Sight (1977) as Ashot
- Late Meeting (1979) as Vasily Mikhailovich Belyakov, painter
- I Shall Never Forget (1983) as Dr. Hakobyan
- The Twentieth Century Approaches (1986) as Baron von Herling
- Gobseck (1986) as Gobseck
- Bandit Petersburg (2001) as Moisey Lazarevich Gutman
- Deadly Force (2003) as grandfather Tarelka
- Streets of Broken Lights (2004) as Pavel Borisov

=== Voice ===
- Solaris (1972) as Dr. Snaut (played by Jüri Järvet)
- Heavenly Swallows (1976) as director of the theater-variety show (played by Ilya Rakhlin)
