= Talents and Admirers (film) =

- Russian: Таланты и поклонники
- Directed by: Isidor Annensky
- Written by: Isidor Annensky
- Starring: Svetlana Pelikhovskaya; Olga Khorkova; Leonid Gubanov; Nikolai Gritsenko; Aleksandr Belyavskiy
- Cinematography: Mikhail Kirillov
- Edited by: Margarita Shadrina
- Music by: Aleksandr Chaykovsky; Tikhon Khrennikov
- Release date: 1973
- Country: Soviet Union
- Language: Russian

Talents and Admirers (Russian: Таланты и поклонники) is a 1973 Soviet drama film directed by Isidor Annensky. It is based on the play with the same name by Alexander Ostrovsky.

== Plot ==
The film tells the dramatic story of an actress who has to make a difficult choice.

== Cast ==
- Svetlana Pelikhovskaya as Aleksandra Nikolayevna Negina
- Olga Khorkova as Domna Panteleyevna
- Leonid Gubanov as Ivan Semyonych Velikatov
- Nikolai Gritsenko as Irakliy Stratonych Dulebov
- Aleksandr Belyavskiy as Grigoriy Antonych Bakin
- Nonna Terentyeva as Nina Vasilyevna Smelskaya
- Vladimir Bogin as Pyotr Yegorych Meluzov
- Yevgeny Lebedev as Martyn Prokofyich Narokov (as Yevgeni Lebedev)
- Rudolf Pankov as Vasya
- Grigori Abrikosov as Yerast Gromilov
