= The Safety Match =

- Russian: Шведская спичка
- Directed by: Konstantin Yudin
- Written by: Anton Chekhov (story); Nikolay Erdman
- Starring: Alexey Gribov; Andrei Popov; Mikhail Yanshin; Nikolai Gritsenko; Tamara Nosova
- Cinematography: Igor Gelein; Valentin Zakharov
- Music by: Vasiliy Shirinskiy
- Production company: Mosfilm
- Release date: 1954
- Running time: 53 minutes
- Country: Soviet Union
- Language: Russian

The Safety Match, or The Swedish Match (Russian: Шведская спичка, romanized: Shvedskaya spichka) is a 1954 Soviet comedy film directed by Konstantin Yudin, an adaptation of Anton Chekhov's 1884 story of the same name.

The film tells the story of a meticulous investigator who unravels a web of deceit, obsession, and mistaken motives while searching for a missing man presumed murdered, only to uncover him alive and drunk in an unexpected hiding place.

== Plot ==
Gardener Yefrem notices that his master, retired cornet Klyauzov, has suspiciously not woken up for a week and hasn't left his bedroom. Klyauzov's manager, Psekov, concludes that Klyauzov has been murdered and informs the local constable. Investigator Chubikov and his assistant Dyukovsky arrive and break down the bedroom door, only to find that Klyauzov—dead or alive—is not there.

The meticulous Dyukovsky, attentive to every detail, deduces that Klyauzov was smothered with a pillow (which bears teeth marks) while removing his boots (one boot is in the bedroom, the other later found in the garden). He also discovers a burned Swedish match on the floor, unusual since Klyauzov used sulfur matches. Suspicions fall on Klyauzov's servant Nikolay and manager Psekov. Dyukovsky, who knows everyone's secrets, uncovers a potential motive: both men (along with Chubikov and Dyukovsky himself) were infatuated with Akulka, a woman of questionable virtue who favored Klyauzov over them.

However, Dyukovsky realizes inconsistencies in his theory: someone like Psekov wouldn't commit such a murder personally, and someone like Nikolay wouldn't use a pillow. He concludes that Klyauzov's sister, an Old Believer with her own motive, might be involved. The Swedish match then leads Dyukovsky to another accomplice—Olga Petrovna, the young wife of the constable, who was hopelessly in love with Klyauzov.

Indeed, Chubikov and Dyukovsky find Klyauzov alive, healthy, and predictably drunk, being held as a "prisoner" by Olga in an abandoned bathhouse.

== Cast ==
- Alexey Gribov as Magistrate Nikolai Yermolayevich Chudikov
- Andrei Popov as Detective Emil Dyukovsky
- Mikhail Yanshin as Police Capt. Yevgraf Kuzmich
- Nikolai Gritsenko as Psekov, estate manager
- Nikolai Kurochkin as Yefrem, majordomo
- Vladimir Kolchin as Nikolai Tetekho
- Tamara Nosova as Akulina
- Ksenia Tarasova as Maria Ivanovna Klyauzova
- Marina Kuznetsova as Olga Petrovna
- Mikhail Nazvanov as Mark Ivanovich Klyauzov
- Vladimir Pokovsky as The Doctor
- Georgy Gyeorgiu as Police Official

== Critics ==
Elena Bauman of the Soviet Screen magazine called the movie "one of the first signs of the new "free" cinema" (referring to the Khrushchev Thaw era) "which — as it seemed — accidentally stepped over the stone-dead canons, playfully challenged the sedate art style of those years". According to her, even the title challenged the official patriotic campaign against cosmopolitans, while the movie itself worked as a satire on KGB. At the same time, she noted the superb ensemble cast that consisted of some of the biggest comedy names and a very authentic portrait of Anton Chekhov's period and writings.

== Legacy ==
During 2015 which was declared the Year of Literature in Russia The Safety Match was widely shown at various film festivals and retro movie screenings across the country as part of the programme dedicated to 155 years since Anton Chekhov's birth.
