= Isidor Annensky =

- Born: 13 March 1906; Olviopol, Russian Empire
- Died: 2 May 1977 (aged 71); Moscow, Soviet Union
- Occupation: Film director
- Years active: 1938-1973

Isidor Markovich Annensky (Russian: Иси́дор Ма́ркович А́нненский; 13 March 1906 – 2 May 1977) was a Soviet screenwriter and film director. Annensky was named Merited Artist of the RSFSR in 1971.

== Life and career ==
Annensky studied at a music school in Odessa and graduated from the Odessa Theater School in 1922. He then worked as a stage actor and director in Odessa, Arkhangelsk, Baku, and Moscow, before enrolling in the Russian Institute of Theatre Arts, where he stayed until 1934, and in the VGIK, graduating in 1936. Annensky debuted at Belarusfilm with the medium-length Anton Chekhov adaptation The Bear (1938), which brought attention to him as a director.

One of his biggest box-office successes was the screen version of Chekhov’s early comedy The Wedding (1944). He worked in a variety of genres; adventure movies such as the pilot drama The Fifth Ocean (1940), melodrama Ekaterina Voronina (1957), musical A Sailor from the Comet (1958), youth comedy The First Trolleybus (1964), and revolutionary chronicle Tatyana's Day (1967). He regularly adapted and popularized Russian classical literature well into the 1970s, ending his career with Aleksandr Ostrovsky’s comedy Talents and Admirers (1973).

== Filmography (selected) ==
- Talents and Admirers (film) (1973)
- Troye (1969)
- Tatyana's Day (1968)
- The First Trolleybus (1963)
- Vashingtonskaya istoriya (TV Movie) (1962)
- Sleepless Night (1960)
- Matros s "Kometi" (1958)
- Ekaterina Voronina (1957)
- Princess Mary (1955)
- The Anna Cross (1954)
- The Wedding (1944)
- Neulovimy Jan (1942)
- Pyatyy okean (1940)
- The Wedding (1944)
- Man in a Shell (1939)
- The Bear (1938)
