= A Fortress in the Mountains =

- Directed by: Vladimir Gerasimov; Konstantin Yudin
- Written by: Nikolay Erdman; Mikhail Volpin
- Cinematography: Timofei Lebeshev
- Music by: Antonio Spadavekkia
- Production company: Mosfilm
- Release date: 7 November 1953
- Running time: 99 minutes
- Country: Soviet Union
- Language: Russian

A Fortress in the Mountains (Russian: Застава в горах, romanized: Zastava v gorakh) is a 1953 Soviet adventure film directed by Vladimir Gerasimov and Konstantin Yudin and starring Vladlen Davydov, Marina Kuznetsova and Yelena Shatrova. It was made by Mosfilm using the Sovcolor process. It was the third most successful Soviet film at the box office that year, with attendance figures of 44.8 million.

The film is an early Cold War action thriller, set in Central Asia.

== Synopsis ==
From Moscow arrives Senior Lieutenant Lunin to the frontier who is assigned as its deputy chief. Due to the illness of the former chief, the lieutenant has to take command of the outpost. At the same time foreign intelligence is trying to enter the USSR territory. Near the state border under the guise of archaeologists spies under the name of Stanley and Marrow are deployed. The local Basmach gang of Ismail-Beg who are paid by their leadership, is trying to make an attack on Soviet territory as a diversion to their main operation - their imperceptible transition to the Soviet side. However, the operation fails; the gang is broken up, its remnants thrown over the border river and the violator spies are arrested and exposed.

== Cast ==
- Vladlen Davydov as Lunin
- Marina Kuznetsova as Vera Alexandrovna
- Yelena Shatrova as Polina Antonovna
- Sergei Gurzo as Kuleshov
- Stanislav Chekan as Martshenko
- Arkadi Shcherbakov as Prochorov
- Aleksandr Susnin as Vorobev
- Mikhail Majorov as Grachyov
- Vladimir Popov as Sledovatel
- Mukhamejan Kasymov as Ismail-Beg
- Vladimir Belokurov as Marrow
- Aleksey Krasnopolsky as Bridger
- Oleg Solyus as Ben Stanley
- Georgi Chernovolenko as Carter
- Nina Agapova as Marya Tikhonovna
- Boris Popov as Inspector
- Radner Muratov as Akhmet
- Aleksey Alekseev as Ustinov – mayor

== Bibliography ==
- Hutchings, S. Russia and its Other(s) on Film: Screening Intercultural Dialogue. Springer, 2008.
- Rollberg, Peter. Historical Dictionary of Russian and Soviet Cinema. Scarecrow Press, 2008.
