= The Bear (1938 film) =

- Russian: Медведь
- Directed by: Isidor Annensky
- Written by: Isidor Annensky; Anton Chekhov
- Produced by: Grigory Kobilivker
- Starring: Olga Androvskaya (ru); Mikhail Zharov
- Cinematography: Yevgeni Shapiro (ru)
- Music by: Valeri Zhelobinsky (ru)
- Release date: 11 July 1938
- Running time: 43 min.
- Country: Soviet Union
- Language: Russian

The Bear (Russian: Медведь, romanized: Medved') is a 1938 Soviet short film directed by Isidor Annensky.

== Plot ==
The landlord Yelena Popova, who is going through the death of her husband, visits the owner of the neighboring estate, Grigory Smirnov, who insistently demands the repayment of Elena's husband's debt in order to improve her unfavorable financial situation, and, having been refused, calls her to a duel.

== Cast ==
- Olga Androvskaya (ru) as Yelena Ivanovna Popova
- Mikhail Zharov as Grigori Stepanovich Smirnov
- Ivan Pelttser (ru) as Luka, footman
- Konstantin Sorokin (ru) as servant
- Maria Shlenskaya as Smirnov's servant
