= The House of the Dead (1932 film) =

1932 film

The House of the Dead (1932)

The House of the Dead (Russian: Мёртвый дом, romanized: Myortvyy dom) is a 1932 Russian film directed by Vasili Fyodorov from a script by Viktor Shklovsky, based on the novel of the same name by Fyodor Dostoevsky. Shklovsky changed the name of the script several times, eventually calling it The House of the Dead (Mertvyi dom). The film stars Nikolay Khmelyov, Nikolay Podgorny, Nikolai Vitovtov and Mikhail Zharov.

== Cast ==
- Nikolay Khmelyov as Fyodor Dostoyevsky
- Nikolai Podgorny as K.P. Pobedonstzev
- Nikolai Vitovtov as Tsar Nikolai I
- Nikolai Radin as L.V. Doubelt
- Vladimir Belokurov as Stammering Announcer
- Vladimir Uralsky
- Vasili Kovrigin as Uspensky
- Gleb Kuznetsov as Guards soldier
- Viktor Shklovsky as Petrashevsky
- Georgiy Sochevko as Yastrzhembskiy

== Release ==
The film was banned in Spain in 1935, but acquired by the British National Film Centre and the British Film Museum for showing in the Dostoyevsky jubilee in 1972.
