= Salamander (film) =

1928 film

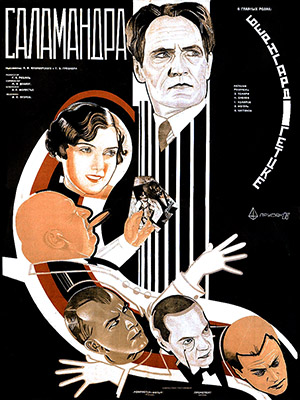
- Directed by: Grigori Roshal
- Written by: Georgiy Grebner; Anatoli Lunacharsky
- Starring: Bernhard Goetzke; Natalya Rozenel; Nikolay Khmelyov; Sergey Komarov
- Cinematography: Louis Forestier; Phil Jutzi
- Production companies: Mezhrabpomfilm; Prometheus-Film
- Release date: 12 April 1928
- Running time: 90 minutes
- Countries: Soviet Union; Germany
- Languages: Silent; Russian/German intertitles

Salamander (Russian: Саламандра, romanized: Salamandra) is a 1928 Soviet-German silent biopic film directed by Grigori Roshal and starring Bernhard Goetzke, Natalya Rozenel and Nikolay Khmelyov. It is also notable as the first film credit of Aleksandr Shelenkov, specifically as an assistant cameraman - he went on to be a noted Soviet cinematographer.

== Plot ==
The film is based on real events and reveals the tragic episodes from the life of the Austrian biologist Paul Kammerer (1880-1926), who died of suicide after being attacked by regressive scientists and Catholic reactionaries, and accused of faking his evidence.

The film is set in Leipzig, Germany, which is ruled by clergy and aristocracy, at a time when fascism is starting to emerge, and the working class is forced to live in poverty. Professor Zange is employed here and he is one of the few who sympathizes with the poor. The scientist uses salamanders for his experiments and learns that their inheritance is dependent on external factors. As he makes this discovery he becomes a menace to the existing political system and the clergy conspires with the aristocracy to get rid of him by framing him for having fabricated evidence. Unlike Kammerer, Zange has a happy ending: he meets a former student who convinces him to come to Moscow, and they ride off together in a train bearing a streamer that reads, "To the land of liberty."

== Cast ==
- Bernhard Goetzke as Professor Zange
- Natalya Rozenel as Felicia, his wife
- Nikolay Khmelyov as Prince Ruprecht Karlstein, fascist
- Sergey Komarov as Pater Brzhezinskiy, jesuit
- Vladimir Fogel as baron-reactionist
- Aleksandr Chistyakov as Prayer, pressman
- Mikhail Doller as Filonov, Zange's assistant
- Elza Temary as Bertha, Zange's assistant
- Anatoli Lunacharsky

== Bibliography ==
- Christie, Ian & Taylor, Richard. The Film Factory: Russian and Soviet Cinema in Documents 1896-1939. Routledge, 2012.
- Bernhard Götzke in Moskau. In: Wochenbericht der Gesellschaft für kulturelle Verbindung der Sowjetunion mit dem Auslande 4 (1928), Nr. 32, p. 18 (Short article about a reception in honour of Goetzke in Moscow by the Society for Cultural Relations of the Soviet Union with Foreign Countries on the occasion of the completion of the film "Salamander" with speeches by Olga Kameneva, Anatoly Lunacharsky, Grigori Roshal, Aleksej A. Sidorov and Goetzke (in German, with 1 photo)).
