= Marina Kuznetsova =

Soviet actress

- Born: 1925; Soviet Union
- Died: 1996 (aged 70–71); Russia
- Occupation: Actress
- Years active: 1953-1994 (film)

Marina Kuznetsova (1925–1996) was a Soviet stage and film actress.

== Selected filmography ==
- Krechinsky's Wedding (1953)
- A Fortress in the Mountains (1953)
- The Safety Match (1954) as Olga Petrovna

== Bibliography ==
- Tony Shaw & Denise Jeanne Youngblood. Cinematic Cold War: The American and Soviet Struggle for Hearts and Minds. University Press of Kansas, 2010.
