= Miles of Fire =

1957 film

- Miles of Fire
- Directed by: Samson Samsonov
- Written by: Nikolai Figurovsky
- Produced by: Semyon Maryakhin
- Starring: Igor Savkin; Margarita Volodina; Vladimir Kenigson
- Cinematography: Fyodor Dobronravov
- Edited by: Zoya Veryovkina
- Music by: Nikolai Kryukov
- Distributed by: Mosfilm
- Release date: November 1, 1957
- Running time: 85 mins
- Country: Soviet Union
- Language: Russian

Miles of Fire, The Burning Miles, or The Fiery Miles (Russian: Огненные вёрсты, translit. Ognennye versty) is an early Red Western directed by Samson Samsonov in 1957. Often considered the earliest of the 'Red Westerns' (or 'Osterns'), it was made before the term was coined. The film is a Russian Civil War drama, focusing on the conflict between the Reds and the Whites.

One-time Mosfilm actor Samsonov had a versatile directorial career prior to The Burning Miles, fresh from an adaptation of Chekhov's The Grasshopper that won two prizes at the Venice Film Festival. He was later awarded the title of 'People's Artist of the USSR'.

== Plot ==
Set during the Russian Civil War in 1919, as the forces of Yudenich near Petrograd and the White Guard Army, led by General Anton Denikin, lay siege to a southern city to suppress a rebellion. They block the railway, but Chekist Zavragin, in a hurry to travel south, devises a plan to use tachankas—machine gun carts—to reach his destination. He attracts an unusual group of equally desperate fellow travelers, including an elderly doctor, a young nurse, an actor from the Imperial Theaters of the Russian Empire, and a mysterious soldier who claims to be a veterinarian.

On the train before Zavragin's departure, the mysterious soldier (Vladimir Kenigson) defends the nurse (Margarita Volodina) from robbers. Later, Zavragin receives confidential information about an imminent mutiny among military specialists from a dying commissar. The group sets off through the steppes, with their only landmarks being the floodplains. They stop for the night at a khutor, but the veterinarian is revealed to be a White Army colonel. He kills the young driver of the tachanka and lightly wounds Zavragin.

The next day, a group of mounted Cossacks pursues them. The actor is killed, and the doctor is gravely injured, but Zavragin reaches the city just in time to suppress the mutiny during a secret meeting disguised as a card game. In the final confrontation, the White officer jumps out of a window and fires back but is killed by Zavragin near an iron fence. The film concludes with Zavragin embracing the nurse in a hospital ward.

== Style ==
The Burning Miles is influenced by railroad Western films like John Ford's classic Stagecoach, because of the diverse set of characters thrown together in desperate circumstances. Zavragin's companions on his journey include the doctor Shelako, the nurse Katya and a mysterious white guard officer Beklemishev, disguised as a veterinary surgeon. This formula gives the film an extra psychological dimension as the characters' progress towards their destination echoes the resolution of their problems and transitions in relationships.

== Main cast ==
- Igor Savkin (Grigory Fyodorovich Zavragin)
- Margarita Volodina (Katerina Gavrilovna)
- Mikhail Troyanovsky (Dr. Shelako)
- Vladimir Kenigson (Sergei Beklemishev)
