= Brave People =

- Poster for release in Czechoslovakia as Muži v sedle ("Men in the saddle")
- Directed by: Konstantin Yudin
- Written by: Mikhail Volpin; Nikolai Erdman
- Starring: Sergei Gurzo; Alexey Gribov; Tamara Chernova; Oleg Solyus; Rostislav Plyatt
- Cinematography: Igor Geleyn
- Music by: Antonio Spadavecchia
- Release date: 1950
- Running time: 95 minutes
- Country: Soviet Union
- Language: Russian

Brave People (Russian: Смелые люди, romanized: Smelye lyudi), initially announced on release abroad by Mosfilm as The Horsemen, is a 1950 Soviet war drama film, directed by Konstantin Yudin. The film starred Sergei Gurzo and Alexey Gribov, and was Yudin's first drama film, as he had previously worked predominantly on comedies.

The film was positively received and was the number one film in the Soviet Union during the year of its release.

The film is set in the Great Patriotic War, but the plot, an adventure about a boy and his racehorse set in the Caucasus, is strikingly different from the grim realism of other war films of the era.

== Synopsis ==
The setting of the film is USSR during the pre-war years. Vasiliy Govorukhin (Sergei Gurzo), a young stud farm worker, who has nurtured an excellent horse with the nickname Buyan; but the cruel trainer Vadim Beletsky (Oleg Solyus) has strong doubts concerning the outstanding qualities of the horse.

True character of Beletsky is exposed during the Great Patriotic War; it turns out that he is a Nazi German spy and saboteur, also he has already prepared to convey the Soviet elite horses to the Nazi.

Stud farm workers, caught on occupied by Nazi troops territory, prepare and organize a Soviet partisan unit led by Koshin. The detachment is intended for combat, intelligence and other operations behind enemy lines.

Vasiliy Govorukhin, along with his faithful horse Buyan show their courage and resourcefulness; together they are to expose enemy spies and save the best horses from the export to Germany.

This turns out to be a difficult task, because the Nazis take hostage Soviet women, children and old men and put them into a wagon, hitched to the rolling stock together with the horses ...

== Cast ==
- Sergei Gurzo - Vasily Terentevich Govorukhin, stud farm worker
- Alexey Gribov - Konstantin Sergeevich Voronov, Nadya's grandfather, senior trainer of the stud farm
- Tamara Chernova - Nadezhda Petrovna Voronova
- Oleg Solyus - trainer of the stud farm Vadim Beletsky who is also the German spy Otto Fuchs
- Nikolay Mordvinov - Kozhin, party worker, commander of the guerrilla unit
- Vladimir Dorofeev - Kapiton Kapitonovich, veterinarian
- Kapan Bader - Hakim, partisan
- Sergei Bobrov - Prohor Ilyich, director of the stud farm
- Oleg Potocki - Kolya Deviatkin
- George Gumilevsky - Uncle Stepan, herdsman
- Victor Proklov - herdsman
- Simon Svashenko - herdsman
- Rostislav Plyatt - von Schwalbe, a German officer
