= The Anna Cross =

1954 film

- Russian: Анна на шее
- Directed by: Isidor Annensky
- Written by: Anton Chekhov (story); Isidor Annensky
- Starring: Alla Larionova; Vladimir Vladislavskiy; Aleksandr Sashin-Nikolsky; Mikhail Zharov; Alexander Vertinsky
- Cinematography: Georgiy Reysgof
- Edited by: Raisa Shor
- Music by: Lev Shvarts
- Production company: Gorky Film Studio
- Release date: 1954
- Running time: 82 min.
- Country: Soviet Union
- Language: Russian

The Anna Cross (Russian: Анна на шее, romanized: Anna na shee) is a 1954 Soviet historical drama film directed by Isidor Annensky. It won the "Golden Olive Branch" prize at the International Film Festival in Italy in 1957

The film tells of a young woman who sacrifices her freedom in a loveless marriage to save her impoverished family, only to find herself trapped in societal expectations and torn between duty and desire for independence.

== Plot ==
“There wasn’t even a light snack after the wedding...” writes Anton Chekhov in the story that serves as the basis for this film. It follows Anna, an 18-year-old girl who, in an attempt to help her impoverished family, agrees to marry 52-year-old civil servant Modest Alexeyevich. After the death of her mother, Anna’s father, Pyotr Leontyevich, a calligraphy and art teacher, descended into heavy drinking. With two younger brothers, Petya and Andryusha, to care for, the family faced dire financial straits, and creditors threatened to seize their belongings. Matchmakers presented Anna with a “profitable match” in Modest Alexeyevich, a wealthy older man with an estate and considerable savings.

The marriage, which seemed like a solution, brought little happiness. Anna feared her husband, who was miserly, controlling, and moralistic. She was kept practically confined, with only elderly colleagues of her husband and their wives for company. Meanwhile, her father and brothers continued to struggle, despite Modest Alexeyevich’s begrudging financial help, which he delivered alongside lectures and reproaches. Anna began contemplating escape but could not summon the courage.

Everything changed at the Christmas Ball. Hoping that Anna might impress the governor’s wife and help him secure the Order of Saint Anna (2nd Class), Modest Alexeyevich allowed her money for a dress. Anna, pouring all her creativity into her attire, appeared dazzling at the ball, stunning the provincial society, including wealthy merchant Artynov and the governor himself. As Anna basked in her newfound freedom and attention, her husband, who had envisioned personal advancement through her social success, found himself reduced to the role of her servant, footing her bills while she ignored him entirely. Still, he achieved his coveted decoration.

Amidst her revelry, however, Anna forgot her struggling father and brothers. Their possessions were seized, and they were evicted from their state-owned apartment, left to fend for themselves without her support.

== Cast ==
- Alla Larionova as Anna
- Vladimir Vladislavskiy as Modest Alekseyevich
- Aleksandr Sashin-Nikolsky as Pyotr Leontievich, father
- Mikhail Zharov as Artynov
- Alexander Vertinsky as The Prince
- Irina Murzaeva as Mavra Grigorievna
- Pyotr Maltsev as Petya, kid brother (as Petya Maltsev)
- Aleksandr Metyolkin as Andryusha, kid brother (as Sasha Metyolkin)
- Tatyana Pankova as The Dressmaker
- Vladimir Shishkin as Dezdyemonov
- Gennady Zaichkin as Shegolyev
- Natalya Belyovtseva as The Princess
- Alexey Gribov as Ivan Ivanovich
- Vladimir Soshalsky as officer
- Vera Altayskaya as lady in a carriage

== Release ==
The film was watched by 31.9 million Soviet viewers, which is the 314th highest figure in the history of Soviet film distribution.
