= Tatyana's Day =

- Russian: Татьянин день
- Directed by: Isidor Annensky
- Written by: Nikolai Otten
- Starring: Lyudmila Maksakova; Vladimir Tatosov; Anatoliy Antosevich; Valeriy Pogoreltsev; Dalvin Shcherbakov
- Cinematography: Aleksandr Rybin
- Music by: Moisey Vaynberg
- Release date: 1967
- Country: Soviet Union
- Language: Russian

Tatyana's Day (Russian: Татьянин день) is a 1967 Soviet historical drama film directed by Isidor Annensky.

== Plot ==
The film takes place in Petrograd. The film tells about the organization of the first working youth organization...

== Cast ==
- Lyudmila Maksakova as Tanya Ogneva
- Vladimir Tatosov as Yakov Mikhaylovich Sverdlov
- Anatoliy Antosevich as Antonov
- Valeriy Pogoreltsev as Vernik
- Dalvin Shcherbakov as Turnin
- Valentina Moldovanova as Irina
- Vladimir Kolokoltsev as Metyolkin
- Semyon Morozov as Semynin
- Aleksandr Martynov as Zernov
