= Pavlik Morozov =

Soviet murder victim (1918–1932)

- Павлик Морозов
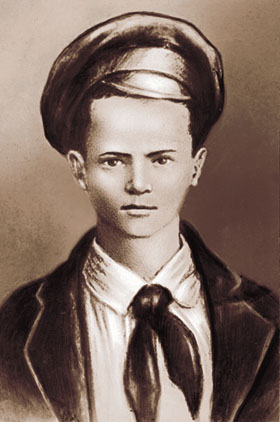
- Soviet portrait supposedly of Pavlik Morozov, wearing the Young Pioneers red scarf
- Born: Pavel Trofimovich Morozov; 14 November 1918; Gerasimovka, Turinsky Uyezd, Tobolsk Governorate, Russian State
- Died: 3 September 1932 (aged 13); Gerasimovka, Ural Oblast, Russian SFSR, USSR
- Cause of death: Knife wounds
- Known for: Supposedly turning his father in to Soviet officials for corruption
- Parent(s): Trofim Sergeyevich Morozov (presumed shot in 1932); Tatyana Semyonovna Morozova (née Baidakova; died in 1983)
- Relatives: Brothers: Fyodor Morozov (killed along with Pavel at eight years old), Alexei Morozov (killed in World War II), Roman Morozov

Pavel Trofimovich Morozov (Russian: Па́вел Трофи́мович Моро́зов; 14 November 1918 – 3 September 1932), better known by the diminutive Pavlik, was a Soviet youth praised by the Soviet press as a martyr. Evidence has emerged since the dissolution of the Soviet Union of the fabrication of the Pavlik Morozov legend, as well as what Soviet officials thought of him. His story, dated to 1932, is that of a 13-year-old boy who denounced his father to the authorities and was in turn killed by his family. His story was a subject of reading, songs, plays, a symphonic poem, a full-length opera, and six biographies. His politicized and mythologized story was used to encourage Soviet Bloc children to also inform on their parents.

== Popular story ==
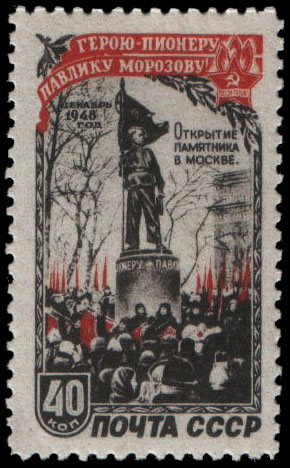
Morozov honoured on a 1950 Soviet postage stamp

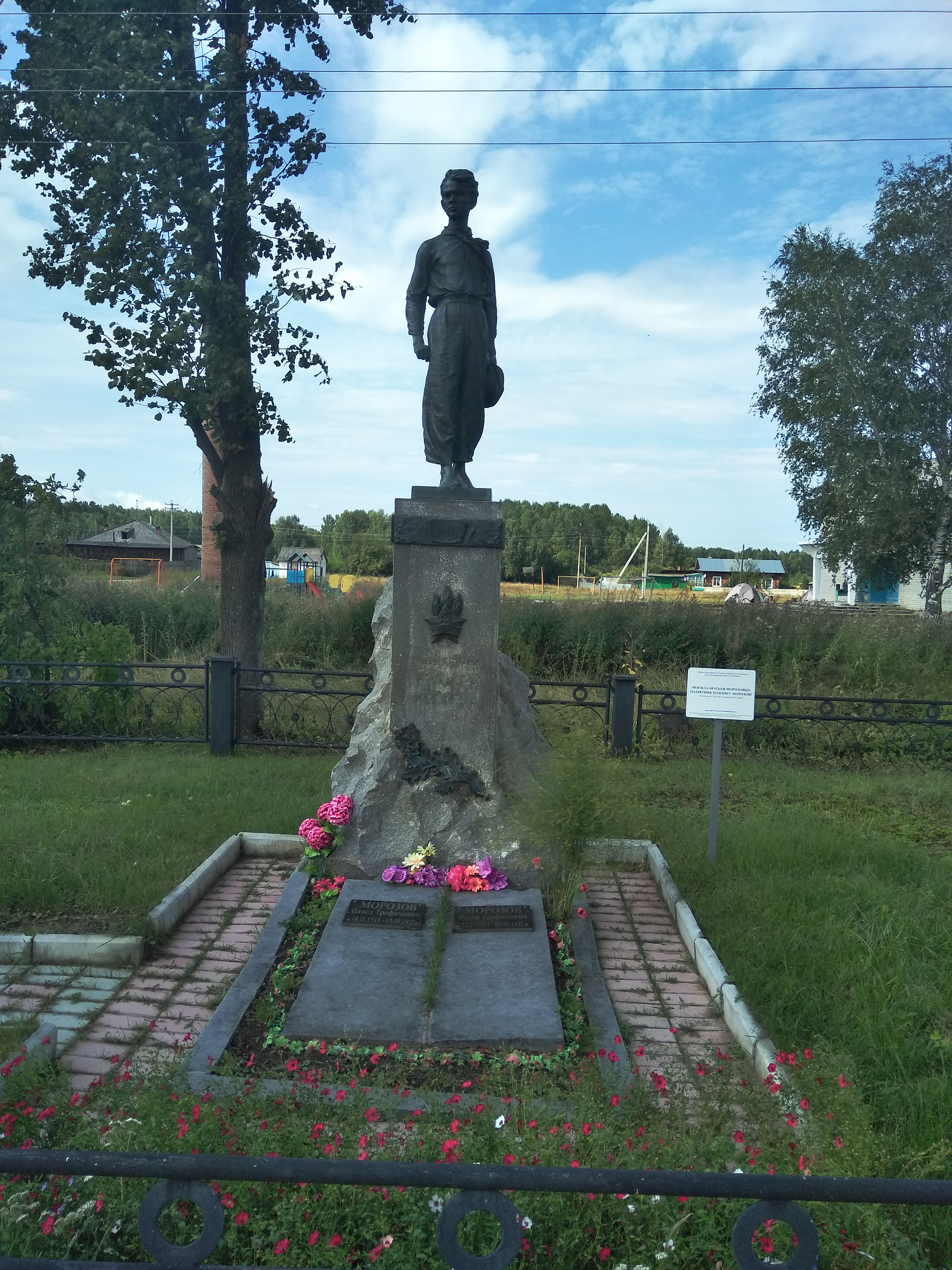
Grave of Pavlik Morozov and his brother Fedya in Gerasimovka, Sverdlovsk region

The most popular account of the story is as follows: born to poor peasants in Gerasimovka, a small village 350 kilometres (220 mi) north-east of Yekaterinburg (then known as Sverdlovsk), Morozov was a dedicated communist who led the Young Pioneers at his school and supported Stalin's collectivization of farms.

In 1932, at the age of 13, Morozov reported his father to the political police (GPU). Supposedly, Morozov's father, Trofim, the chairman of the Gerasimovka Village Soviet, had been "forging documents and selling them to the bandits and enemies of the Soviet State" (as the sentence read). Trofim Morozov was sentenced to ten years in a labour camp, where his sentence was changed to death, which was fulfilled. However, Pavlik's family did not take kindly to his reporting his father and on 3 September of that year, his uncle, grandfather, grandmother, and a cousin murdered him, along with his younger brother. All of them except the uncle were rounded up by the GPU and sentenced to "the highest measure of social defense" – execution by a firing squad.

Thousands of telegrams from all over the Soviet Union urged the judge to show no mercy for Pavlik's killers. The Soviet government declared Pavlik Morozov a glorious martyr who had been murdered by reactionaries. Statues of him were built, and numerous schools and youth groups were named in his honour. An opera and numerous songs were written about him. The Gerasimovka school that Morozov attended became a shrine, and children from all over the Soviet Union went on school excursions to visit it. The Cultural Palace of the Young Pioneers was renamed after him. The USSR widely distributed a painting of Pavlik stating "I accuse my father not as his son, but as a Pioneer" while standing underneath a painting of Lenin at a courthouse. Sergei Eisenstein produced a film about Pavlik's life. According to Nadezhda Mandelstam's memoirs, while in exile in Kalinin (now Tver), she met a boy who was also in exile with his family who "spent his days denouncing his parents as traitors and lamenting the fact that, unlike Pavlik, he had not denounced his parents in time", saying "Stalin is my father and I do not need another one."

During the investigation of Trofim Morozov's case, his wife Tatyana Morozova stated that Trofim used to beat her and also brought home valuables received as payment for selling forged documents. According to this testimony, Pavlik merely confirmed evidence given by his mother.

== Veracity and later research ==
Evidence has emerged since the dissolution of the Soviet Union of the fabrication of the Pavlik Morozov legend, as well as what Soviet officials thought of him. Maxim Gorky spoke to the Communist youth organization in 1933 of "the heroic deed of Pioneer Pavlik Morozov, the boy who understood that a person who is a relative by blood may well be an enemy of the spirit, and that such a person is not to be spared". Gorky was an ally and favourite of Stalin's, but this particular initiative does not seem to have been to Stalin's taste, at least according to rumour: "What a little swine, denouncing his own father," is one remark attributed to Stalin.

In the mid-1980s, Yuri Druzhnikov, a dissident writer expelled from the Soviet Writers' Union, performed an investigation, met with surviving eyewitnesses, and wrote a documentary exposé about Pavlik. Originally circulated through the samizdat, it was published in Russian in the UK in 1988 and soon thereafter translated into several languages. The first English translation appeared in 1996 under the title Informer 001: The Myth of Pavlik Morozov. Druzhnikov disputes every aspect of the Soviet propaganda version of Pavlik's life. For example, different sources in Soviet literature list different ages for Pavlik at death and show photographs of different boys. Pavlik was not a Pioneer when he was killed. Pavlik's father was the chairman of the local soviet, not a kulak like the Soviet propaganda had claimed. According to the Soviet version, Pavlik's grandfather was responsible for his murder; according to Druzhnikov, the grandfather was heartbroken about the death of Pavlik, organized a search when the boy went missing, and maintained his innocence during the trial. While not saying it outright, Druzhnikov hints that Pavlik was killed by a GPU officer, whom Druzhnikov met while doing his research.

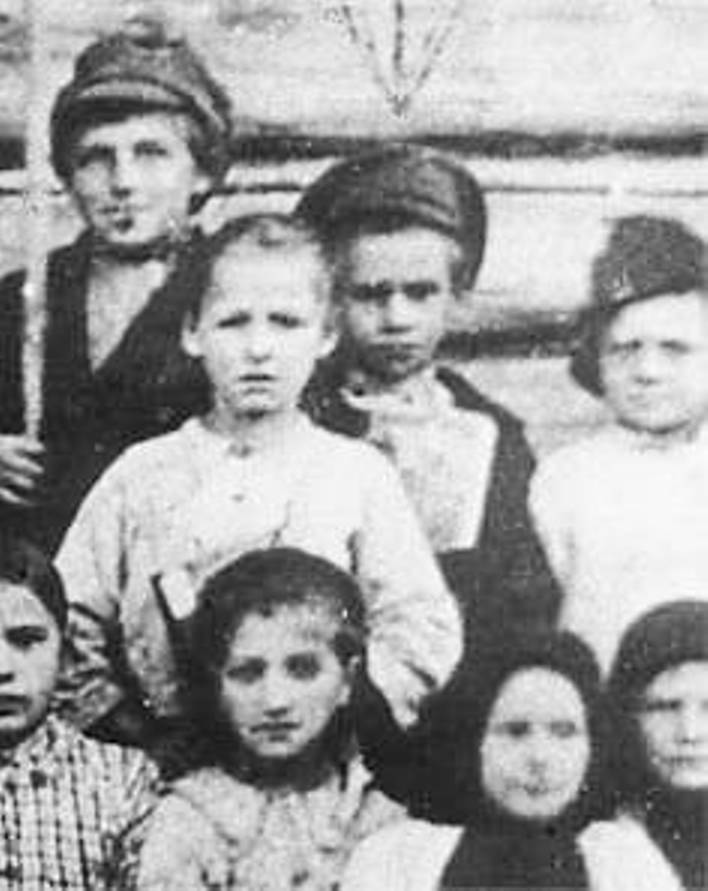
Pavlik Morozov (second row, in the middle): this is the only surviving photograph known of him

In her 2005 book Comrade Pavlik: The Rise and Fall of a Soviet Boy Hero, Catriona Kelly agrees with Druzhnikov that the official version of the account is almost wholly fictional. Kelly had access to the official archives of the case. She determined the evidence is sketchy, based mostly on second-hand reports by alleged witnesses, and that Pavlik did not inform on his parents but was murdered after a mundane squabble. Kelly also shows how the official version's emphasis shifted to suit the changing times and propaganda lines. In some accounts, Pavlik's father's crime was not forging the documents, but hoarding grain; in others, he was denounced not to the secret police, but to a schoolteacher. In some accounts, the method of Pavlik's death was decapitation by saw. The one surviving photograph of him shows a malnourished child who bears almost no resemblance to the statues and images in children's books. It has also been said that he was nearly illiterate and was coerced to inform on his father by his mother; the father deserted the family. Kelly also refuted some of Druzhnikov's claim about OGPU investment in the murder, maintaining that: "while there are traces of OGPU suppression and cover-up of minor facts, there is no reason to believe that the murder itself was instigated by them".

Roman Brackman claims that Pavlik's mother encouraged him to report on his father because she was hoping that it would intimidate him into leaving his mistress and return to them, but this backfired after the State Political Directorate instructed Pavlik on how to incriminate his father in court while testifying.

According to the most recent research, Gerasimovka was described in the Soviet press as a "kulak nest" because its villagers refused to join the kolkhoz, a state-controlled collective farm during the collectivization. Pavlik informed on neighbours when they did something wrong, including his father, who left the family for another woman. Pavlik was not a Pioneer, although he wanted to be one. Kelly believes there is no evidence that the family was involved in the murder of the boy, and that it probably was the work of some teenagers with whom Pavlik had a squabble over a gun. Some villagers from Gerasimovka who claim to have known Pavlik described him as a "shithead", who "did nothing but cause trouble". They said that he always had lice in his hair and that he smelled terrible. He and his brother reportedly urinated on each other after a fight.

== Sexuality ==
Those who remember Morozov said that he was in love with a schoolgirl with whom he had unrequited feelings.

There is evidence of homosexual acts committed by Morozov. He and his older cousin Danila would urinate on each other after fights. As his brother Alexey recounted, the initiative for this action came from Pavlik, and they were doing it to make up. According to Alexey, Pavlik had urophilia.

== In film ==
Morozov's story was the basis of Bezhin Meadow, an unreleased film from 1937 that was directed by Sergei Eisenstein, as well as the 2015 Latvian film Dawn.

== See also ==
- Joseph Bara
- Lei Feng
- Herbert Norkus
- Horst Wessel

== Sources ==
- Fitzpatrick, Sheila (1994). Stalin's Peasants: Resistance and Survival in the Russian Village After Collectivization. Oxford University Press. pp. 255–256. ISBN 9780195104592.
- Baberowski, Jörg (22 November 2016). "Subjugation". Scorched Earth: Stalin's Reign of Terror. Translated by Gilbert, Steven; Komljen, Ivo; Taber, Samantha Jeanne. Yale University Press. pp. 134–136. ISBN 978-0300136982.
- Brackman, Roman (23 November 2004). The Secret File of Joseph Stalin: A Hidden Life. Taylor & Francis. p. 201. ISBN 9781135758400.
- Pisch, Anita (2016). The Personality Cult of Stalin in Soviet Posters, 1929-1953: Archetypes, Inventions and Fabrications. ANU Press. pp. 77–78. ISBN 9781760460631.
- Stern, Radu; Tismaneanu, Vladimir (3 May 2022). Communism and Culture: An Introduction. Springer International Publishing. pp. 84–85. ISBN 9783030826505.
