= The Call of Love =

- Russian: Близнецы
- Directed by: Konstantin Yudin
- Written by: Mikhail Vitukhnovsky; Yakov Yaluner
- Starring: Lyudmila Tselikovskaya; Vera Orlova; Mikhail Zharov; Andrey Tutyshkin; Irina Murzaeva
- Cinematography: Alexander Tarasov
- Edited by: Anna Kulganek
- Music by: Oskar Sandler
- Production company: Mosfilm
- Release date: 1945
- Running time: 83 min.
- Country: Soviet Union
- Language: Russian

The Call of Love (Russian: Близнецы, romanized: Bliznetsy) is a 1945 Soviet comedy film directed by Konstantin Yudin.

The film tells the story of how an electrician's decision to adopt abandoned twins leads to a battle of love, deceit, and redemption, as her community unites to support her while uncovering the dark secrets of a corrupt trade manager.

== Plot ==
The story follows Lyuba Karasyova, an electrician who decides to adopt twin babies abandoned at a train station. While her community rallies to support her, including sailors recovering in a military hospital who contribute monthly to help raise the twins, she faces trouble from Yeropkin, the manager of a city trade base, who has his own intentions toward her.

One of the sailors, Sergey Orlikov, falls in love with Lyuba, but complications arise when the twins disappear with Yeropkin's involvement. During the search, the twins' biological mother is discovered, and eventually, the children themselves are found, reuniting them with Lyuba.

The film culminates with Lyuba reciprocating Sergey's love, while her sister Liza also finds romance. Yeropkin, revealed to be both the twins’ father and a swindler, faces his comeuppance with the unexpected arrival of a commission investigating his misdeeds.

== Cast ==
- Lyudmila Tselikovskaya as Lyuba Karaseva
- Vera Orlova as Leza Karaseva
- Mikhail Zharov as Vadim Spiridonovich Yeropkin
- Andrey Tutyshkin as Dr. Petr Petrovich Listopadov
- Irina Murzaeva as Alla Vladimirovna Broshkina
- Pavel Shpringfeld as Anatoly Listopadov
- Dmitri Pavlov as Seaman Serei Orlikov
- Konstantin Sorokin as seaman Gharkov
- Vladimir Gribkov as building manager
- Georgy Svetlani as seller
- Inna Fyodorova as Pavlina Yeropkina
- Svetlana Nemolyaeva as Svetochka
- Vera Vasilyeva as monger
- Elena Tchaikovskaia as Svetochka's friend
- Tatyana Barysheva as director of the orphanage
- Semyon Svashenko as Officer

== Release ==
Konstantin Yudin's film was watched by 20 million Soviet viewers, which is the 927th result in the history of Soviet film distribution.
