= Gutta-percha Boy =

1957 film by Vladimir I. Gerasimov

- Directed by: Vladimir Gerasimov
- Written by: Mikhail Volpin
- Produced by: Valentin Maslov
- Starring: Sasha Popov; Alexey Gribov; Mikhail Nazvanov
- Cinematography: Galina Pyshkova
- Edited by: Anna Kulganek
- Music by: Antonio Spadavecchia
- Production company: Mosfilm
- Release date: August 27, 1957
- Running time: 76 min
- Country: Soviet Union
- Language: Russian

Gutta-percha Boy (Russian: Гуттаперчевый мальчик, romanized: Guttaperchevyy malchik) is a 1957 Soviet drama film adaptation of the novel by Russian writer Dmitry Grigorovich.

== Plot ==
The film is set at the end of the 19th century.

Petya is an eight-year-old orphan who has been given into training to the German acrobat Karl Becker, who with curses and beatings introduces his new assistant to the circus profession and ruthlessly exploits the child in his performances. The only consolation which brightens the harsh life of the gutta-percha boy, as Petya is referred to on the posters, is the concern of the carpet clown Edwards, who pities the orphan and secretly teaches him the real art of the circus. During one of the performances, Petya, while performing a difficult trick on Becker's demand, falls from a high altitude.

== Cast ==
- Alexey Gribov as Clown Edwards
- Mikhail Nazvanov as Karl Bogdanovich Bekker
- Aleksandr Popov as Petya Subbotin (as Sasha Popov)
- Inna Fyodorova as Varvara Akimovna
- Olga Vikladt as Maria Pavlovna
- Ivan Koval-Samborsky as Circus Manager
- Andrei Popov as Count Sergey
- Marina Strizhenova as Countess
- Aleksandra Popova as Aunt Sonya
- Marina Gutkovich as Verochka
