= Alexey Gribov =

Soviet actor

- Алексей Грибов
- Born: January 31 [O.S. January 18] 1902; Moscow, Russian Empire
- Died: November 26, 1977 (aged 75); Moscow, Russian SFSR, Soviet Union
- Occupations: Actor; theatre pedagogue
- Years active: 1924–1977
- Spouses: Elena Baranovskaya; Izolda Apin; Natalia Valandina
- Awards: Stalin Prize (1942, 1946, 1951, 1952); Hero of Socialist Labour (1972)

Alexey Nikolayevich Gribov (Note: Russian: Алексей Николаевич Грибов, romanized: Aleksey Nikolayevich Gribov) (January 31 [O.S. January 18] 1902 – November 26, 1977) was a Soviet and Russian actor, "master of all types of Russian national character" mostly remembered for his comedy roles, as well as a pedagogue at the Moscow Art Theatre. He starred in over 60 movies and was named People's Artist of the USSR in 1948, Hero of Socialist Labour in 1972 and awarded four Stalin Prizes (1942, 1946, 1951 and 1952).

== Biography ==
Alexey and his sister were born in Moscow into a working-class family. His mother worked at the tobacco manufacturing company; she died from tuberculosis when he was four years old. His paternal grandfather was a serf who moved to Moscow from the Lotoshino volost following the Emancipation reform of 1861 and became a machinist. His father Nikolai Mikhailovich Gribov was a driver who escorted Moscow elite such as Nikolai von Meck; after his wife's death he married another woman who gave birth to three children, and in 1916 left for the frontline. Alexey had to become a factory worker to feed the family.

In 1919 he entered an evening school, and in 1921 — the 3rd Moscow Art Theatre studio (modern-day Vakhtangov Theatre). Upon graduation in 1924 he joined the theatre troupe where he had served for the rest 50 years. His acting skills were highly regarded by Konstantin Stanislavski.

Among his notable stage performances were Sobakevich from the 1934 play Dead Souls, Khlynov from An Ardent Heart (1938), Ivan Chebutykin from Three Sisters (1940), Globa from Konstantin Simonov's Russian People (1943), Yepikhodov and Firs from the two different adaptations of The Cherry Orchard (1944 and 1958), Luka from The Lower Depths (1948) and Foma Opiskin from The Village of Stepanchikovo (1970). He was also the first MAT actor to portray Vladimir Lenin in Nikolai Pogodin's play The Kremlin Chimes for which he received his first Stalin Prize.

From 1935 on he also appeared in movies. His famous performances include mostly character comedy roles such as the bride's father from The Wedding (1944), the horse trainer from Brave People (1950) which gained him another Stalin Prize, a bureaucrat Nekhoda from True Friends (1954), a sea captain from Striped Trip (1961), the father-in-law from Adult Children (1961), an old customs official from The Head of Chukotka (1966) and the head of the photo studio from Zigzag of Success (1968). He also did a lot of voice acting at Soyuzmultfilm.

During the Great Patriotic War Gribov and other actors regularly visited the frontline with performances for which he was awarded the Medal "For Valiant Labour in the Great Patriotic War 1941–1945". In 1944 he joined the Communist Party. He taught acting at the Moscow Art Theatre School, gaining a title of professor in 1970.

In 1974 he survived a massive stroke while performing in Three Sisters which became his last stage appearance. He had to learn to talk and walk again and finally started teaching students, but his health declined. Alexey Gribov died in 1977 and was buried at the Novodevichy Cemetery.

== Personal life ==
Gribov was married three times. His first wife, Elena Vladimirovna Baranovskaya, was 10 years older and had been previously married to a theatre pedagogue Alexei Nikolaevich Baranovsky who taught Gribov at the start of his career. Their relationships were said not to be based on love: he wanted to support Baranovskaya when she became a widow at the start of the war. While still married he started dating Izolda Fyodorovna Apin, a director and administrator at the Moscow Art Theatre, and in 1947 she gave birth to their son Alexey Gribov. In five years he divorced and married her. His last wife Natalia Iosifovna Valandina was a director's assistant at Mosfilm, 26 years younger than him. He also started dating her while still married to Apin. He later adopted her two daughters from two previous husbands.

Among Gribov's closest friends were Anatoli Ktorov and Mikhail Yanshin. As young men he and Yanshin professionally took part in dressage and horse racing and became hippodrome regulars during later years. In the 1950 movie Brave People Gribov performed as a horse trainer and chose to ride the horse himself, and at one point they nearly fell off a cliff.

== Selected filmography ==
- Red Army Days (1935) as Gorbunov
- Peat-Bog Soldiers (1938) as Schulz
- Man in a Shell (1939) as Afanasy, Belikov's servant
- The Wedding (1944) as Zhigalov, father of the bride
- Duel (1944) as a Commissar
- Guilty Without Guilt as Shmaga
- The Vow (1946) as Kliment Voroshilov
- The Fall of Berlin (1949) as Kliment Voroshilov
- Brave People (1950) as Konstantin Sergeevich Voronov – Stalin Prize second degree (1951)
- Secret Mission as the Intelligence General
- The Miners of Donetsk (1950) as Kliment Voroshilov
- Sporting Honour (1951) as Pyotr Grinko
- The Night Before Christmas (1951) as narrator (voice)
- The Inspector-General (1952) as Osip, Khlestakov'a servant
- Kashtanka (1952) as monsieur Georges (voice)
- Mysterious Discovery (1953) as Servanov
- The Anna Cross (1954) as Ivan Ivanovich
- True Friends (1954) as Vitaliy Grigorievich Nekhoda
- The Safety Match (1954) as a magistrate Nikolai Yermolayevich Chudikov
- Son (1954) as Sergei Ivanovich Kondratiev
- The Frog Princess as grandpa Kondrat (voice)
- The Twelve Months as Brother January (voice)
- Gutta-percha Boy (1957) as Clown Edwards
- Dead Souls (1960) as Mikhail Semyonovich Sobakevich
- Alyosha's Love (1960) as Zinka's grandfather
- Blind Musician (1960) as Fyodor Kaniba
- Sleepless Night (1960) as Pyotr Batavin
- Striped Trip (1961) as captain Vasiliy Vasilievich
- Adult Children (1961) as Anatoly Kuzmich Korolyov
- Seven Nannies (1962) as Lena's grandfather
- Fitil № 18, 66, 183 (1963, 1967, 1969) as Pal Palych/Stepan Petrovich/Alexander Semyonov
- A Don Novella (1964) as Kuzmich, an old Cossack
- Chief of Chukotka (1966) as Timofey Ivanovich Khramov
- The Tale of the Golden Cockerel (1967) as Tsar Dodon (voice)
- Zigzag of Success (1968) as Polotentsev
- Day by Day (1971) as uncle Yura
- The Humpbacked Horse (1975) as the Tsar/narrator (voice)

== Awards ==
- Stalin Prize first degree (1942, 1946, 1952)
- Stalin Prize second degree (1951)
- Stanislavsky State Prize of the RSFSR (1974)
