= The First Trolleybus =

- Russian: Первый троллейбус
- Directed by: Isidor Annensky
- Written by: Iosif Leonidov; Yunior Shilov
- Starring: Irina Gubanova; Lev Sverdlin; Nina Sazonova; Aleksandr Demyanenko; Dalvin Shcherbakov
- Cinematography: Vitali Grishin
- Music by: Andrei Eshpai; Rostislav Boyko
- Production companies: Odesa Film Studio; Gorky Film Studio
- Release date: 1963
- Running time: 82 min.
- Country: Soviet Union
- Language: Russian

The First Trolleybus (Russian: Первый троллейбус, romanized: Perviy trolleybus) is a 1963 Soviet teen romance film directed by Isidor Annensky.

== Plot ==
The film tells about a beautiful trolleybus driver named Svetlana, who enchants all the young people who ride the trolleybus. She had to quit her job in order to go to college, but having entered there, she realized that she lacked the attention of those guys and she decided to study in absentia and again became a trolleybus driver.

== Cast ==
- Irina Gubanova as Sveta Soboleva
- Lev Sverdlin as Sveta's Father
- Nina Sazonova as Maria Ignatyevna
- Aleksandr Demyanenko as Sergei
- Dalvin Shcherbakov as Pavel
- Evgeniy Anufriyev as Vasya
- Oleg Dal as Senya
- Viktor Bortsov as Kiryushin
- Nina Doroshina as Dasha
