= Grigori Abrikosov =

Soviet actor

- Born: Grigori Andreyevich Abrikosov; 30 August 1932; Moscow, RSFSR, Soviet Union
- Died: 13 April 1993 (aged 60); Moscow, Russia
- Occupation: Actor
- Years active: 1956–1988
- Parent: Andrei Abrikosov

Grigori Andreyevich Abrikosov (Russian: Григорий Андреевич Абрикосов; 30 August 1932 – 13 April 1993) was a Soviet stage and film actor. He was the son of Andrei Abrikosov. He studied in the same class as Mikhail Samuilovich Agursky.

In 1954, he graduated from the Shchukin Theatre School (artistic director — A. A. Oročko). From 1953 to 1954, he was an actor at the Vladimir Mayakovsky Theatre. From 1954 to 1993, he was one of the leading actors of the Vakhtangov State Academic Theatre, where he performed alongside his father. He worked on this stage until the end of his life.

He appeared in numerous films. He is best known for his role as Ataman Hrytsian Tavrichesky in the musical comedy Wedding in Malinovka, in which he starred together with his father, Andrei Abrikosov, who played Hrytsian’s father.

He died on April 13, 1993, in Moscow, at the age of 60. He was buried at Novodevichy Cemetery next to his parents. Soon after, his wife, theatre actress Marina Mikhailovna Kuznetsova (1925–1996), was buried beside him.

== Filmography ==
Year	Title	Role	Notes
1956	Behind the Footlights	Kozachinsky	
1957	The Wrestler and the Clown	Mr. Fish	
1967	Wedding in Malinovka	Gritsian Tavrichesky, leader of the bandits, Balyasny's son	
1973	Talents and Admirers	Yerast Gromilov	

== Awards ==
- Honored Artist of the RSFSR (1968)
- People's Artist of the RSFSR (1984)
