= Margarita Volodina =

Soviet actress

Margarita Vladimirovna Volodina (Russian: Маргари́та Влади́мировна Воло́дина; born 1938 in Leningrad) is a Soviet film and stage actress.

Her first husband was film director Samson Samsonov.

In 1994 she went to her daughter to France, living in Paris.

== Awards ==
- Best Actress of the USSR for the magazine Soviet Screen (1963)
- Honored Artist of the RSFSR (1965)
- People's Artist of the RSFSR (1973)

=== Selected filmography ===
- Miles of Fire as Katerina Gavrilovna (1957)
- A Sleepless Night as Nina (1960)
- Amphibian Man as Canary in a bar (1961)
- An Optimistic Tragedy as Commissar (1962)
- Each Evening at Eleven as Lyuda (1969)
- The Last Victim as Yuliya Pavlovna Tugina (1975)
- Late Meeting as Masha, Gushin's wife (1979)
- Time and the Conways as Kay (1984)
