= The Wedding Album =

The Wedding Album may refer to:

- Wedding Album, a 1969 album by John Lennon and Yoko Ono
- Wedding Album (Leon and Mary Russell album), 1976
- Duran Duran (1993 album), also known as The Wedding Album
- The Wedding Album (TV series), a FOX television pilot from 2006
- Cheech & Chong's Wedding Album, a 1974 comedy album recorded by Cheech & Chong
- Superman: The Wedding Album, a 1996 comic book featuring Superman
- "The Wedding Album" (short story), a 1999 science fiction story by David Marusek

== See also ==
- Photograph album
