= Wedding (disambiguation) =

A wedding is a formal ceremony which unites people in marriage.

Wedding may also refer to:

== Film and TV ==
- Wedding (1972 film), a Polish drama directed by Andrzej Wajda
- A Wedding (1978 film), an American comedy directed by Robert Altman
- "A Wedding" (Glee), a 2015 episode of the U.S. television series
- A Wedding (2016 film), a drama directed by Stephan Streker also known as Noces
- Wedding (TV series), a Korean drama broadcast by KBS in 2005
- "Wedding" (Drifters), a 2015 sitcom episode
- "Wedding" (Men Behaving Badly), a 1997 sitcom episode
- "Wedding" (My Hero), a 2001 sitcom episode
- "Wedding" (Peep Show series 2), a 2004 sitcom episode
- "Wedding" (Peep Show series 4), a 2007 sitcom episode

== Music ==
- A Wedding (opera), a 2004 comic opera based on Robert Altman's 1978 film A Wedding
- Wedding (album), by Shinhwa, 2002
- "Wedding" (song), by Hep Stars, 1966
- "Wedding", a song by Angels of Light from Everything Is Good Here/Please Come Home, 2008

== Other ==
- Wedding (Berlin), a locality in Mitte, Berlin, Germany
- Ryan Wedding (born 1981), drug trafficker
- One of the last steps in automobile manufacturing, where chassis, transmission, and engine of a car are combined with its body. (Note: More on this and the final vehicle assembly of automobile manufacturing in the German Wikipedia (in German).)

== See also ==
- The Wedding (disambiguation)
- Destination Wedding, a 2018 film starring Winona Ryder and Keanu Reeves
