= Nikolai Vlasov =

Soviet flying ace (1916–1945)

Nikolai Ivanovich Vlasov
- Николай Иванович Власов
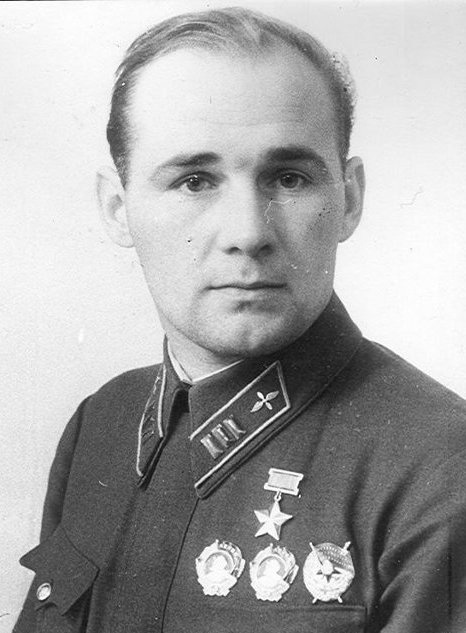
- Vlasov in 1943
- Born: 11 November 1916; Petrograd, Russian Empire
- Died: 26 January 1945 (aged 28); Mauthausen-Gusen concentration camp, Nazi Germany
- Military career
- Allegiance: Soviet Union
- Branch: Soviet Air Force
- Service years: 1934–1945
- Rank: Podpolkovnik
- Unit: 275th Fighter Aviation Division
- Conflicts: World War II
- Awards: Hero of the Soviet Union; Order of Lenin (2); Order of the Red Banner

Nikolai Ivanovich Vlasov (Russian: Николай Иванович Власов; 11 November 1916 – 26 January 1945) was a flying ace, lieutenant colonel of the Soviet Air Forces, and a Hero of the Soviet Union. On 29 July 1943 his Yak-1 fighter was shot down over Leningrad by anti-aircraft fire from the ground. After being taken captive he led underground resistance efforts in the various concentration camps he was held in and managed to make multiple escape attempts. After one escape attempt he was sent to Mauthausen where he made preparations for a prisoner uprising. However, he did not live to participate in the prison revolt as he had been betrayed by another prisoner and held under close watch of the SS. After being tortured by the SS he was thrown alive into a crematorium furnace on 26 January 1945 as Allied troops were approaching the area. Several of his fellow prisoners went on with the uprising after his death, and on 3 February 1945 roughly 500 prisoners from his block broke through a fence and escaped.

== Early life ==
Vlasov was born on 11 November 1916 to a working-class Russian family in Petrograd, then part of the Russian Empire. Upon completing seven grades of secondary school he worked as a mechanic at a factory and served as secretary of a Komsomol committee until joining the Red Army in 1934. After completing flight courses at a military aviation school he became qualified as a flight instructor in 1936 before joining the Communist Party of the Soviet Union in 1939.

== World War II ==
Vlasov was active in the defense of the Soviet Union after the first day of Operation Barbarossa as a squadron commander of a fighter aviation regiment on the Western Front. In August 1941 he committed an aerial ramming after the guns on his plane jammed while he was attempting to intercept a German reconnaissance plane. The ramming was successful and the German plane was destroyed, but Vlasov was seriously injured upon bailing out of his aircraft. His injuries left him unable to fly for a year and required a long stay in the hospital. Once he was released from the hospital he spent his time training young fighter pilots. Eventually in June 1942 he was permitted to return to flying, but instead of flying a fighter he started by flying a Po-2 night bomber. On one mission he was tasked with landing his plane near enemy troops to transport a wounded pilot, Hero of the Soviet Union Filipp Demchenkov, to safety. Vlasov successfully carried out the mission under heavy enemy fire; after making 220 sorties in the war, participating in 27 dogfights, and shooting down ten enemy aircraft he was awarded the title Hero of the Soviet Union on 23 November 1942. He travelled to the Kremlin to receive the award.

On the morning of 29 July 1943 Vlasov's Yak-1 was shot down by enemy by anti-aircraft artillery fire over Leningrad. Vlasov was thrown out of his plane when it crashed into the ground; he survived, but due to the extent of his injuries was unconscious when German troops found him. Upon waking up in captivity he was heavily confused, but because they hadn't taken away his medals he thought that he was not a captive and tried to walk a few meters, only to be stopped by guards. After failing to get him to cooperate with the Axis he was put on a freight train and sent concentration camp near the city of Lodz in occupied Poland. In spring 1944 he made his first escape attempt but failed and was relocated to a prison in Würzburg, Germany. Not wanting his precious gold star medal to be taken away by the Germans if something were to happen to him, Vlasov gave the medal to another prisoner to hold on to – general Mikhail Lukin, who lost his leg in the war; Lukin hid the medal by sewing it into his belt. Vlasov then planned a second escape attempt, in which he pretended to be sick and then tried to climb out of a hospital window, but after being caught he was sent to Mauthausen concentration camp in Austria (then part of Nazi Germany). He then attempted to organize a prisoner uprising upon the approach of Soviet troops, but after one member of his inner circle betrayed him to the SS, he was tortured and burned alive in a crematorium oven on 26 January 1945. Despite his death the uprising went on and on 3 February 1945 a group of roughly 500 prisoners attacked a portion of the fence and escaped from the camp.

== Commemoration and legacy ==
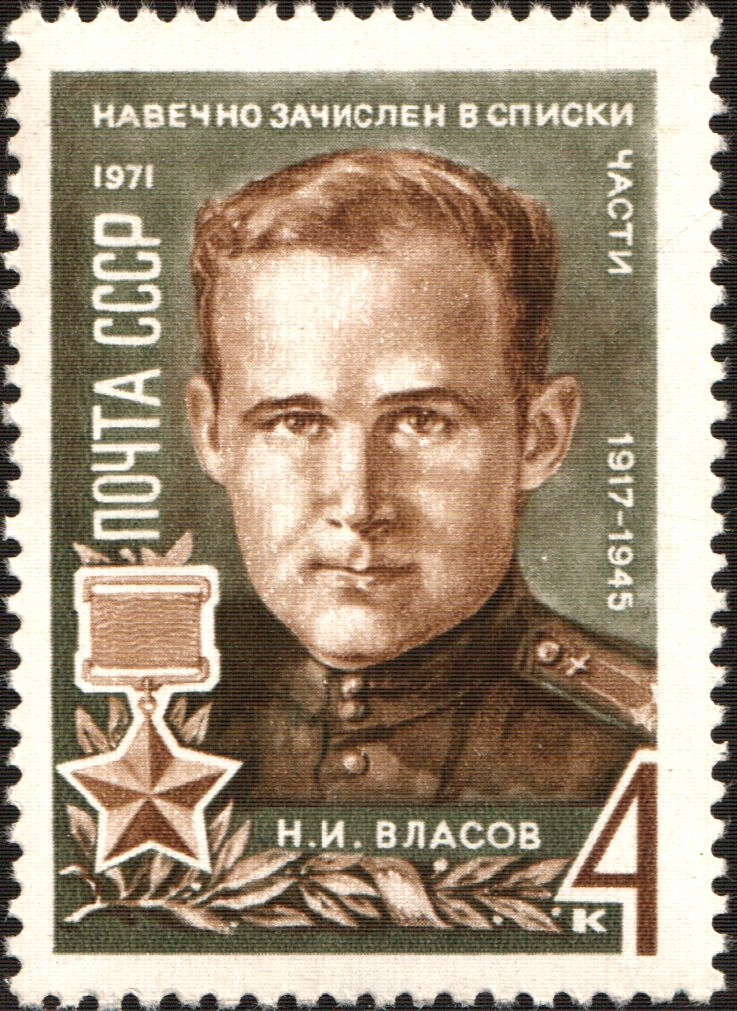
Vlasov on a 1971 stamp of the USSR

Unlike many Soviet prisoners of war, Vlasov remained praised by the Soviet military for his loyalty and courage in the war. After his brutal death he was not posthumously repressed for the act of being captured but was hailed as a hero and a role model for other personnel of the Soviet Armed Forces for his refusal to change loyalties or act against his military oath. In 1971 his portrait was featured on a Soviet postage stamp; streets throughout the Soviet Union were named in his memory and memorials were dedicated in his honor.
