= The Wedding (1944 film) =

- Directed by: Isidor Annensky
- Written by: Isidor Annensky
- Starring: Erast Garin; Zoya Fyodorova; Alexey Gribov; Faina Ranevskaya; Sergey Martinson
- Cinematography: Yuri Ekelchik
- Music by: Valery Zhelobinsky
- Production companies: Kartuli Pilmi; Mosfilm
- Release date: July 14, 1944
- Running time: 64 min
- Country: Soviet Union
- Language: Russian

The Wedding (Russian: Свадьба, romanized: Svadba) is a 1944 Soviet comedy film directed by Isidor Annensky.

The film, created by the eponymous vaudeville of Anton Chekhov, the stories of The Wedding with General, Before the wedding, the novel in two parts of the Marriage of convenience skit Bride and papa is a caustic satire on the mores of the middle class philistine pre-revolutionary Russia.

== Plot ==
The burgess Zhigalov family who have a marriageable daughter Dasha, learn to their horror that the official Aplombov (Erast Garin) who dined with them every day and established himself as a groom, is not going to marry her at all. With great difficulty Dasha's father manages to persuade the ambitious groom to propose. The groom agrees, putting the condition of compulsory attendance of the General at the wedding.

At last the wedding takes place. At a festive moment the chief guest arrives—the General. A scandal erupts at the peak of merriment when it becomes apparent that the General is not really a General, but only a captain of the second rank (lieutenant colonel). The wedding is ruined.

== Cast ==
- Alexey Gribov as Evdokim Zhigalov, father of the bride
- Faina Ranevskaya as Nastassja Timofeevna Zhigalova, mother of the bride
- Erast Garin as Epaminondas Maksimovic aplomb groom
- Zoya Fyodorova as Dasha, bride
- Nikolay Konovalov as Fedor Yakovlevich Revunov-Karaulov, the captain of the 2nd rank in retirement
- Mikhail Yanshin as Andrei Nyunin, the agent of the insurance company
- Sergey Martinson as Ivan Mikhailovich Yat, telegraph
- Vera Maretskaya as Anna Martynovna Zmeyukina, midwife
- Osip Abdulov as Harlampi Spiridonovich Dymba, confectioner
- Lev Sverdlin as grinder
- Tatyana Pelttser as doctor's wife
- Irina Murzaeva as guest
- Mikhail Pugovkin as guest

== See also ==
- The Wedding (Chekhov play)
