= Gerasimovka, Sverdlovsk Oblast =

Rural locality in Tavdinsky District, Sverdlovsk Oblast, Russia

Coordinates: 58°05′24″N 65°46′58″E

Gerasimovka (Russian: Гера́симовка) is rural locality (a village) in Tavdinsky District of Sverdlovsk Oblast, Russia.

The village is notable as the place of Pavlik Morozov's life and murder. There is a memorial to Pavlik Morozov and his brother Fedya by sculptor Sazhin, the memorial building of the school where Pavlik Morozov studied and the Pavlik Morozov City Museum of Forest.

The postal code of the village is 623968.
