= Just Married (disambiguation) =

Just Married is a 2003 American romantic comedy film.

Just Married may also refer to:

- Just Married (1928 film), a 1928 American comedy silent film
- Just Married (2007 film), an Indian Hindi-language film
- Just Married (2025 film), an Indian Kannada-language film
- "Just Married" (song), a 1958 single by Marty Robbins
