= Mikhail Zharov =

Russian actor and director (1899–1981)

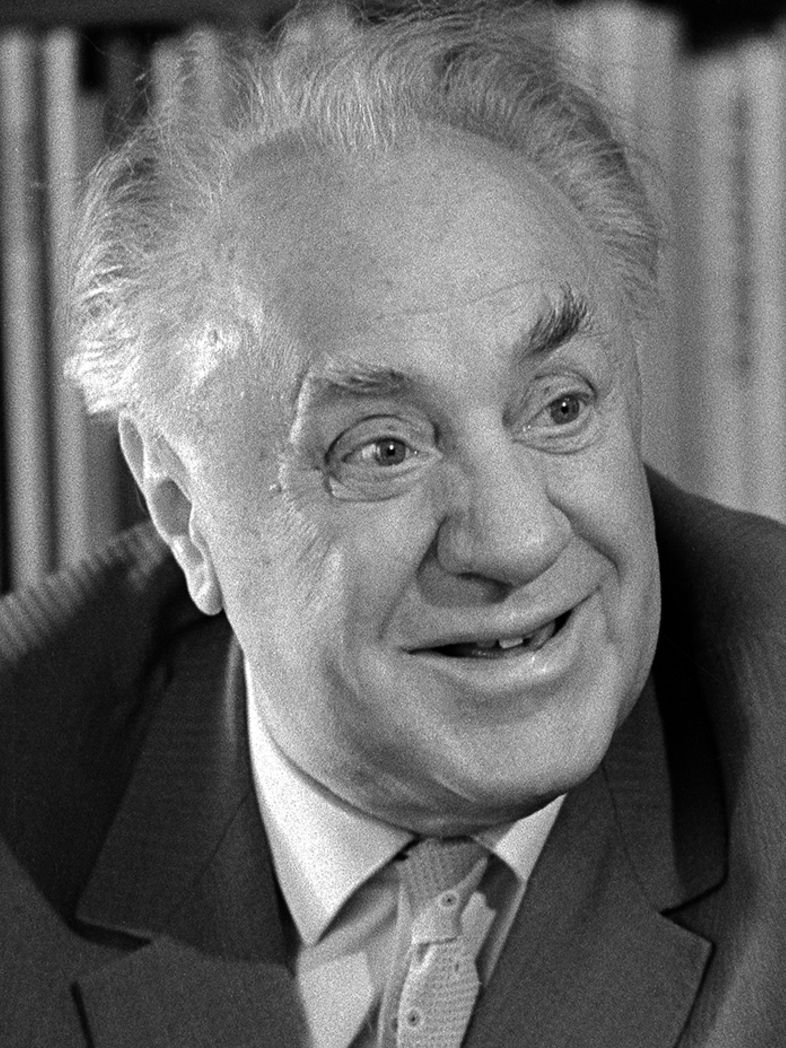
- 1980
- Born: Mikhail Ivanovich Zharov; 27 October 1899; Moscow, Russian Empire
- Died: 15 December 1981 (aged 82); Moscow, Soviet Union
- Occupations: Actor, theater and film director
- Years active: 1915–1978

Mikhail Ivanovich Zharov (Russian: Михаи́л Ива́нович Жа́ров; 27 October 1899 – 15 December 1981) was a Soviet and Russian stage and film actor and director. People's Artist of the USSR (1949) and Hero of Socialist Labour (1974).

== Career ==
He studied under the prominent director Theodore Komisarjevsky and debuted in Yakov Protazanov's Aelita (1924). Later he became a Protazanov regular, appearing in The Man from the Restaurant (1927) together with Mikhail Chekhov.

In the 1930s he was a leading actor of Alexander Tairov's Chamber Theatre before moving to the Maly Theatre where, starting in 1938, he was engaged for the rest of his life and most fully unfolded his actor's gift, mainly playing classical repertoire parts (in Wolves and Sheep, The Inspector-General, Heart is not a Stone, The Thunderstorm, etc.)

Mikhail Zharov gained wide popularity thanks to the role of Zhigan in Nikolai Ekk’s internationally known drama Road to Life (1931). Playing the leader of a gang of thieves, the actor made use of the opportunities of the first sound film: he endowed his character with a specific accent, played the guitar, and sang songs with his peculiar charm. In 1933 he appeared in Boris Barnet's Outskirts.

The most acclaimed of his sound films were Vladimir Petrov's Peter the Great (1937), in which he played Prince Menshikov, and Sergei Eisenstein's Ivan the Terrible (1945/58), in which he played Malyuta Skuratov. His last and probably most popular role was that of Aniskin, an amusing and witty village militiaman in the television series The Village Detective (1968), Aniskin & Fantomas (1974) and Aniskin Again (1978).

== Death ==
Mikhail Zharov died in Moscow on December 15, 1981, in his 83rd year, of peritonitis. He was buried at Novodevichy Cemetery (plot No. 9).

== Awards ==
- Two Stalin Prizes first degree (1941, 1942)
- Stalin Prize second degree (1947)
- Hero of Socialist Labour (1974)
- People's Artist of the USSR (1949)

== Partial filmography ==
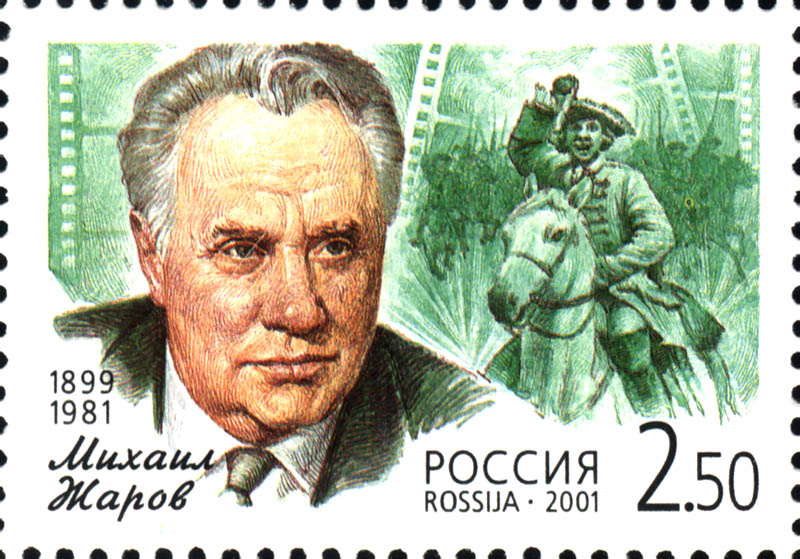
Zharov on a 2001 stamp of Russia

- Tsar Ivan Vasilevich Groznyy (1915) – Soldier
- Aelita (1924) – Actor in Play
- His Call (1925)
- Chess Fever (1925)
- Miss Mend (1926)
- Man from the Restaurant (1927) – The Waiter
- Belyy oryol (1928)
- Don Diego and Pelagia (1928) – Himself
- Dva-Buldi-dva (1929)
- Road to Life (1931) – Thomka Zhigan
- The House of the Dead (1932) – Officer (uncredited)
- Dvadtsat shest komissarov (1932) – Menshevik
- Okraina (1933) – Krayevitch – Menchevik student
- Marionettes (1934) – Head of Frontier Post
- The Storm (1934) – Koudryash
- Three Comrades (1935) – The Engineer
- Lyubov i nenavist (1935) – Ensign Kukva
- Po sledam geroya (1936)
- The Return of Maxim (1937) – Platon Vassilievich Dymba, billiards braggart
- Peter the Great (1937, part 1) – Alexander Danilovich Menshikov – Stalin Prize first degree (1941)
- The Bear (1938) – Grigori Mikhailovich Smirnov
- The Vyborg Side (1939) – Platon Vassilievich Dymba
- Man in a Shell (1939) – Mikhail Kovalenko
- Stepan Razin (1939) – Lazunka – boyar's son
- Engineer Kochin's Error (1939) – Lartsev
- Bogdan Khmelnitskiy (1941) – Deacon Gavrilo
- The Defense of Tsaritsyn (1942, part 1, 2) – Perchikhin – Stalin Prize first degree (1942)
- The District Secretary (1942) – Gavril Fedorovich Rusov
- Aktrisa (1943) – Reciter in hospital
- In the Name of the Fatherland (1943) – Ivan Ivanovich Globa
- The Aerial Cabman (1943) – Ivan Baranov
- The Young Fritz (1943, Short) – Fritz
- Ivan the Terrible (1945, 1958, part 1, 2) – Czar's Guard Malyuta Skuratov
- The Call of Love (1945) – Vadim Spiridonovich Yeropkin
- Bespokoynoe khozyaystvo (1946) – Semibab
- For Those Who Are at Sea (1948) – Kharitonov
- Michurin (1949) – Khrenov
- Happy Flight (1949) – Driver Zachyosov
- Vassa Zheleznova (1953) – Prokhor Khrapov
- The Anna Cross (1954) – Artynov
- A Girl with a Guitar (1958) – Sviristinsky
- Mlechnyy Put (1959) – Mikhail Silovich
- Kain XVIII (1963) – Minister of War
- Vnimanie! V gorode volshebnik! (1964) – Cook
- Older Sister (1967) – Ukhov
- Village Detective (1969) – Aniskin

== See also ==
- Vsevolod Meyerhold State Theatre
