= Nikolai Khmelyov =

Soviet actor (1901–1945)

- Николай Хмелёв
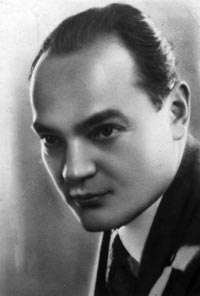
- Khmelyov in the 1920s
- Born: 10 August [O.S. 28 July] 1901; Sormovo, Nizhny Novgorod Governorate, Russian Empire
- Died: 1 November 1945 (aged 44); Moscow, Russian SFSR, Soviet Union
- Occupations: Actor; Theater director; Teacher
- Years active: 1924–1945

Nikolai Pavlovich Khmelyov (Note: Russian: Николай Павлович Хмелёв, romanized: Nikolay Pavlovich Khmelyov) (10 August [O.S. 28 July] 1901 – 1 November 1945) was a Soviet and Russian stage and film actor, theater director, and pedagogue, associated with the Moscow Art Theatre and later the Yermolova Theatre.

== Biography ==
Nikolai Khmelyov was born in Sormovo, Nizhny Novgorod, to a working-class family. "A man who was highly ambitious, always dissatisfied with himself and difficult to contact with," he joined the MAT's Second Studio in 1919, soon to become "one of the most intriguing figures of the 'second generation' of MAT actors," according to the theatre historian Inna Solovyova. He excelled in the parts of Tsar Fyodor in Tsar Fyodor Ioannovich by Aleksey Tolstoy (1935), Karenin in Anna Karenina (1937), Tuzenbach in Three Sisters by Anton Chekhov (1940), but before that as Alexey Turbin in The Days of the Turbins by Mikhail Bulgakov, which brought him critical recognition and fame in 1926.

"Khmelyov imparted his characters with extreme tension and clarity… His stage moves were both highly elaborate and unexpected, he was totally free in his choice of stylistic means and emotional colours, and he loved the sudden change of perspectives," Solovyova wrote. His Karenin and Turbin were lavishly praised by Joseph Stalin who, upon seeing MAT's Anna Karenina in 1937, instantly issued an order for Khmelyov and Alla Tarasova to be awarded the titles of the People's Artist of the USSR.

A respected pedagogue, in 1932 Khmelyov founded his own theatre studio. In 1937 it merged with Yermolova Theatre, which he was the director of in 1937–1945. In 1920–1939 he was cast in seven Soviet films, including Salamander (1928), Bezhin Meadow (1937) and The Man in a Case (1939). Khmelyov was a recipient of numerous state awards (including the Order of the Red Banner of Labour, 1937) and a three times Stalin Prize laureate (1941, 1942 and 1946, posthumously). Khmelyov died on 1 November 1945 in the theatre, during the rehearsals for Hard Days by Aleksey N. Tolstoy in which he played Ivan the Terrible. He is interred in Novodevichy Cemetery.

== Filmography ==
- 1920 – Domestic Agitator – Groom
- 1927 – The End of St. Petersburg – speculator
- 1928 – Salamander – Prince Ruprecht Karlstein
- 1932 – The House of the Dead – Dostoevsky
- 1936 – Generation of Winners – Evgeny Svetlov
- 1936 – Bezhin Meadow – father Styopka
- 1939 – The Man in the Case – Belikov
