= The Wedding (Chekhov play) =

1889 play by Anton Chekhov

The Wedding (Russian: Свадьба, romanized: Svadba) is an 1889 Russian one-act play by Anton Chekhov.

== Roles ==
- Evdokim Zaharovitch Zhigalov
- Nastasya Timofeyevna
- Dashenka
- Epaminond Maximovitch Aplombov
- Fyodor Yakovlevitch Revunov-Karaulov
- Andrey Andreyevitch Nunin
- Anna Martinovna Zmeyukina
- Ivan Mihailovitch Yats
- Harlampi Spiridonovitch Dimba
- Dmitri Stepanovitch Mozgovoy

== See also ==
- The Wedding (1944 film)
