= Wedding Song =

A wedding song is a song sung as wedding music

- Wedding music in general
- A musical epithalamium
- Hindi wedding songs, wedding songs in India

(The) Wedding Song may refer to:

== Books ==
- Wedding Song (novel), a novel by Naguib Mahfouz
- Wedding Song, a 1994 romance novel by Vicki Lewis Thompson

== Film ==
- The Wedding Song (1918 film), Hungarian film
- The Wedding Song (1925 film), American film
- The Wedding Song (2008 film), Franco-Tunisian film

== Music ==
=== Classical ===
- The Bridal Chorus, from Richard Wagner's opera Lohengrin, used as wedding processional music
- The "Wedding March", from Felix Mendelssohn's incidental works (Op. 61), used as wedding recessional music
- Wedding Song, orchestral work by Elisabetta Brusa
- Hochzeits-Lied (Wedding Song), by Kurt Weil from The Threepenny Opera

=== Songs ===
- "Wedding Song (There Is Love)", a song by Paul Stookey
- "Wedding" (song), a 1966 single by Hep Stars
- The Wedding (song) or "La novia ", a song by Julie Rogers
- "Wedding Song", a song by The Psychedelic Furs from The Psychedelic Furs
- "Wedding Song", a song by Bob Dylan from the album Planet Waves
- "Wedding Song", a song by Reneé Rapp from the album Snow Angel (Reneé Rapp album)
- "The Wedding Song", a 1974 song by Ral Donner
- "The Wedding Song", a song by David Bowie from Black Tie White Noise
- "Because We Are In Love (The Wedding Song)", by The Carpenters
