= Sergei Gurzo =

- Сергей Гурзо
- Born: 23 September 1926; Moscow, Soviet Union
- Died: 19 September 1974 (aged 47); Leningrad, Soviet Union
- Occupation: Actor
- Years active: 1948—1962

Sergei Safonovich Gurzo (Russian: Сергей Сафонович Гурзо; 23 September 1926 – 19 September 1974) was a Russian stage and film actor. He was married to the dancer and actress Irina Gubanova.

== Biography ==
Gurzo born September 23, 1926, in Moscow patriarchal family. His grandfather was an archpriest, his father a doctor, his mother taught the exact sciences in Gnessin State Musical College. Sergei's uncle Ivan Mikhailovich Kudryavtsev was a People's Artist of the USSR, he played on the stage of the Moscow Art Theater.

== Selected filmography ==
- The Young Guard (1948) as Sergei Tyulenin
- On Peaceful Days (1950) as Pavlo Panychuk
- Far from Moscow (1951) as Petya Gudkin
- Brave People (1950) as Vasily Terentevich Govorukhin
- The Encounter of a Lifetime (1952) as Vasov
- A Fortress in the Mountains (1953) as Kuleshov
- Those Born of Storm (1957) as Andrey Ptakha

== Bibliography ==
- Birgit Beumers. Directory of World Cinema: Russia. Volume II. Intellect Books, 2015.
