= New Adventures of Puss in Boots =

- Theatrical release poster
- Directed by: Alexander Rou
- Screenplay by: Sergey Mikhalkov
- Starring: Mariya Barabanova; Anatoly Kubatsky; Vyacheslav Zharikov; Olga Gorelova; Stepan Kayukov; Konstantin Zlobin; Tamara Nosova; Georgy Millyar; Lidiya Vertinskaya
- Cinematography: Igor Shastrov
- Edited by: I. Gordon
- Music by: Andrei Volkonsky
- Production company: Gorky Film Studio
- Release date: May 27, 1958 (Soviet Union)
- Running time: 88 minutes
- Country: Soviet Union
- Language: Russian

New Adventures of Puss in Boots (Russian: новые похождения Кота в сапогах, Novye pokhozhdeniya Kota v Sapogakh) is a 1958 Soviet fairy tale film directed by Alexander Rou. The script was written by Sergey Mikhalkov and combined elements of classic West European fairy tales including "Puss in Boots" and "The Love for Three Oranges".

== Production history ==
Sergey Mikhalkov based the screenplay on his earlier children's play 'A Merry Dream, or Laughter and Tears' (1945), the story of which he had adapted from Carlo Gozzi's play The Love for Three Oranges (1761). His first draft of the script was rejected by Gorky Film Studio, as was a new version entitled 'In the Land of Games' that he submitted in 1956, prior to successfully reworking the material as 'New Adventures of Puss in Boots' in 1957.

This was director Alexander Rou's first fairy tale film of the Thaw era, and his first film in this genre since Kashchey the Immortal (1945). Although its ideological perspective reflected the far-reaching changes that had occurred in Soviet culture and society during the intervening years, the film features many typical examples of Rou's visual style and use of special effects as well as some of his favourite actors, including Georgy Millyar who plays a dual role.

The film was released in the Soviet Union on May 27, 1958, where it was seen by an estimated 15 million viewers.
