= List of Soviet films of 1946 =

A list of films produced in the Soviet Union in 1946 (see 1946 in film).

== 1946 ==
Title	Original title	Director	Cast	Genre	Notes
1946
Cruiser 'Varyag'	Крейсер «Варяг»	Viktor Eisymont	Boris Livanov	War	
The First Glove	Первая перчатка	Andrey Frolov	Vladimir Volodin	Sport	
Heavenly Slug	Небесный тихоход	Semyon Timoshenko	Nikolai Kryuchkov, Vasili Merkuryev	Comedy	
In the Mountains of Yugoslavia	В горах Югославии	Abram Room	Ivan Bersenev	Drama	
The Great Glinka	Глинка	Lev Arnshtam	Boris Chirkov, Vasili Merkuryev, Mikhail Derzhavin, Vladimir Druzhnikov, Katya Ivanova, Valentina Serova	Biopic	Entered into the 1946 Cannes Film Festival.
The Liberated Earth	Освобождённая земля	Aleksandr Medvedkin	Vera Altayskaya, Aleksandr Khvylya, Emma Tsesarskaya, Vasili Vanin	War film	
Life at the Zoo	Жизнь в зоопарке			Documentary	At the 19th Academy Awards it was nominated for Best Documentary Short
A Noisy Household	Беспокойное хозяйство	Mikhail Zharov	Lyudmila Tselikovskaya	Comedy	
Son of the Regiment	Сын полка	Vasili Pronin	Yuri Yankin	War drama	
The Stone Flower	Каменный цветок	Aleksandr Ptushko	Vladimir Druzhnikov	Fantasy	The first full color film
The Vow	Клятва	Mikheil Chiaureli	Mikheil Gelovani, Alexey Gribov	Drama	
The White Fang	Белый Клык	Aleksandr Zguridi	Oleg Zhakov	Drama	

== See also ==
- 1946 in the Soviet Union
