= The Magic Weaver =

- Directed by: Aleksandr Rou
- Written by: Evgeny Shvarts
- Starring: Mikhail Kuznetsov; Ninel Myshkova; Viktor Perevalov; Georgy Millyar; Alexander Khvylya
- Cinematography: Dmitry Surensky
- Music by: Andrei Volkonsky
- Production company: Gorky Film Studio
- Release date: 1960
- Running time: 74 min
- Country: Soviet Union
- Language: Russian

The Magic Weaver (Russian: Марья-искусница, romanized: Maria-iskusnitsa, "Maria the Weaver") is a 1960 Soviet children's live-action fantasy film directed by Aleksandr Rou and filmed at Gorky Film Studio. It was additionally released in Hungary in 1964. The film was imported to the West in the 1960s and ran in the U.S. in 1966 with English dubbed, on distribution from Allied Artists Pictures. The film tells the story of how an old soldier helps a boy find his mother, Maria the Weaver, who has been kidnapped and carried away by an evil king of the undersea kingdom.

== Plot ==
A soldier returns to his homeland and plays a song on his drum. Two young bears appear who ask him to free their mother trapped in an iron. In fact, Mother Bear's paw is in a strange iron beak which amazes the soldier. The bears tell him that they have not gone to the nearby forest for a long time, because sinister creatures are out there. The soldier wants to know more about this and enters the deathly quiet forest. He finds here the sleeping boy Vanya, who is looking for his mother Maria. She was abducted by the evil spirit of water because she can weave works of art. When the soldier announces his intention to take up the fight against the Water Spirit, he appears before him and the boy. Both of them ask him to return Maria back. The Water Spirit agrees in exchange for the soldier's drum, despite abhorring all noise. The soldier agrees to give him the drum after the Water Spirit leads them to Maria. He takes them into his kingdom.

Under the earth and under water, the Water Spirit guides the soldiers and Vanya into his moated castle. Maria, who longs for her son, meanwhile, has been enchanted by the evil aunt Badweather so that she would lose all interest in her environment and fail to recognize her son. The Spirit of the Water first tries to exchange the drum for one of his servants or for a large sum of gold and money, but the soldier remains steadfast also through Vanya's insistence. Meanwhile, the granddaughter of the Water Spirit Alyonoushka has learned of the visit and believes that the visitors are evil. Under the influence of her grandfather she leads Maria to a magic lake and sixfolds her. Eventually all six Maria's appear before the soldier and Vanya. Only now Alyonoushka recognizes that Maria is Vanya's mother. Vanya has to find the true Maria in a test and Alyonoushka helps him: only the Maria who radiates warmth, is the real one. Vanya chooses correctly, but now the Water Spirit incites all the servants to the group, and the soldier, Vanya and Maria, to flee back to Earth - Alyonoushka joins them. Together they reach Maria's house and the Water Spirit and Badweather try one last time to defeat the group. When the Water Spirit tries to pull Wanja into a well and Vanya yells for help, Maria awakens from her enchantment and saves Vanya. The Water Spirit is drawn from the well and passes to a small puddle. Even the adversary's aunt is destroyed when the sun comes out. She turns into a crow, which is eaten by a cat shortly thereafter. Maria takes Alyonoushka into her small family. The soldier, however, sets out to invite the people of the area to a big celebration with Maria.

== Cast ==
- Mikhail Kuznetsov - Old soldier
- Ninel Myshkova - Maria the weaver
- Viktor Perevalov - Ivanushka
- Anatoly Kubatsky - Water Spirit
- Olga Khachapuridze - Alyonoushka, Water Spirit's daughter
- Georgy Millyar - Prime Minister Croak
- Vera Altayskaya - Aunt Badweather (Nepogodushka)
- Sergei Troitsky - Treasurer
- Alexander Khvylya - Silent sage
