= The Night Before Christmas (1961 film) =

1961 film by Aleksandr Rou

- Directed by: Aleksandr Rou
- Written by: Aleksandr Rou
- Based on: "Christmas Eve" by Nikolai Gogol
- Starring: Alexander Khvylya; Lyudmila Myznikova; Yuri Tavrov; Lyudmila Khityaeva; Sergey Martinson; Anatoly Kubatsky; Georgy Millyar
- Cinematography: Dmitri Surensky
- Edited by: Kseniya Blinova
- Music by: Arkadi Filippenko
- Production company: Gorky Film Studio
- Release date: December 1961
- Running time: 69 minutes
- Country: Soviet Union
- Languages: Russian, Ukrainian

The Night Before Christmas, also known as Evenings on a Farm near Dikanka (Russian: Вечера на хуторе близ Диканьки, romanized: Vechera na khutore bliz Dikanki), is a 1961 Soviet fantasy film directed by Aleksandr Rou, based on a "Christmas Eve", first story in the second volume of the 1832 collection Evenings on a Farm Near Dikanka by Nikolai Gogol.

== Plot ==
The story is set near the village of Dikanka on the night before Christmas. As the villagers take part in carol singing, drinking, and courtship, the blacksmith Vakula persuades the Devil to fly him to Saint Petersburg. There he hopes to obtain a pair of the Empress's shoes in order to win the affection of Oksana.

== Cast ==
- Aleksandr Khvylya as Chub
- Lyudmyla Myznikova as Oksana
- Yuri Tavrov as Vakula
- Lyudmila Khityaeva as Solokha
- Sergei Martinson as Osip, the Sacristan
- Anatoly Kubatsky as Panas
- Vera Altayskaya as Wife of Panas
- Dmitri Kapka as Shanuvalenko
- Mykola Yakovchenko as Patsyuk
- Maryna Sidorchuk as Odarka
- Aleksandr Radunsky as The Head
- Georgi Millyar as The Devil / gossip girl
- Aleksei Smirnov as ambassador
- Irina Murzaeva as gossip woman
- Andrei Demyanenko as Sverbyguz
