= List of Soviet films of the 1940s =

A list of films produced in the Soviet Union between 1940 and 1949:

== 1940s ==
- Soviet films of 1940
- Soviet films of 1941
- Soviet films of 1942
- Soviet films of 1943
- Soviet films of 1944
- Soviet films of 1945
- Soviet films of 1946
- Soviet films of 1947
- Soviet films of 1948
- Soviet films of 1949
