= Eduard Izotov =

Soviet actor

- Born: Eduard Konstantinovich Izotov; 11 November 1936; Surazh, Byelorussian SSR, Soviet Union
- Died: 8 March 2003 (aged 66); Moscow, Russia
- Occupation: Actor
- Years active: 1959–1997

Eduard Konstantinovich Izotov (Russian: Эдуа́рд Константи́нович Изо́тов) (11 November 1936 - 8 March 2003) was a Soviet film actor.

Izotov was born in the Belarusian SSR near Surazh. His parents were Konstantin Iosifovich Izotov and Anna Iosifovna Izotova. He studied acting at the Gerasimov Institute of Cinematography between 1954 and 1959, and in 1959 made his film debut in Sergei Kazakov's In the Silence of the Steppe (V stepnoy tishi). In 1964 he starred as the young hero Ivanushka in the fairy-tale film Jack Frost, the role for which he is best known today.

Izotov enjoyed a successful film career until 1983, when he was implicated in a scheme hatched by some fellow artists to finance a dacha by illegal means. During the trial, he was defended by many distinguished colleagues, among them Pyotr Glebov, Nikolai Kryuchkov, Oleg Strizhenov, and Marina Ladynina. Nevertheless, he was sentenced to three years in prison. The experience was devastating for the sensitive Izotov, and left him in poor health and psychologically damaged. After his release, he had trouble finding work, and suffered from chronic ill health. In 1999 he was honored as a Meritorious Artist of the Russian Federation. He died in 2003 in Moscow, and was buried in the northern suburb of Khimki.

From 1956 to 1980 he was married to Inga Budkevich, a fellow veteran of Alexander Rou's fairy tale films who went on to have a long career in Soviet and Russian cinema. Their daughter, Veronika Izotova (born 1960), also became an actress.

== Filmography ==
Year	Title	Role	Notes
1959	V stepnoy tishi	Tchalikov	
1960	Silneye uragana	Yevgeniy Morozenko	
1962	Shore Leave	student Boris	
1964	Jack Frost	Ivan	
1966	Iyirmialtilar	Ivan Malygin	
1968	Chelovek v zelyonoy perchatke	Fyodor Covello	
1968	Fire, Water, and Brass Pipes		
1969	Ekho dalyokikh snegov		
1970	Morskoy kharakter	Gushchin	
1971	Liberation	Alexei Berest	part 3
1971	Derzhis za oblaka		
1971	Za rekoy, granitsa		
1972	More v ogne	Sergey Shtemenko	
1972	Konets Lyubavinykh	Grinka	
1973	Chelovek v shtatskom	Vsevolod (Alex von Putilov)	
1973	The Great Battle	Aleksey Berest	
1975	Smotret v glaza...		
1976	Speech for the Defence	Arkadii Stepanovich	
1977	Mimino	Vladimir Nikolaevich	
1978	Rallijs	Head of the group of Russian racers	
1979	Father Sergius	Advokat	
1980	Poema o krylyakh	Poddannyy tsarya	
1982	Sluzha otechestvu	Draymond	
1984	Time of Desires	Oleg Ivanovich	Uncredited
