= The Village Teacher (film) =

- Russian: Сельская учительница
- Directed by: Mark Donskoy
- Written by: Mariya Smirnova
- Starring: Vera Maretskaya; Pavel Olenev; Daniil Sagal; Vladimir Lepeshinsky; Vladimir Maruta
- Cinematography: Sergey Urusevsky
- Edited by: A. Soboleva
- Music by: Lev Shvarts
- Production company: Gorky Film Studio
- Release date: 1947
- Running time: 100 min.
- Country: Soviet Union
- Language: Russian

The Village Teacher (Russian: Сельская учительница, romanized: Selskaya uchitelnitsa) is a 1947 Soviet drama film directed by Mark Donskoy.Stalin Prize of the first degree (1948).

The film tells the story of a teacher young Varya, who is going to teach peasant children in one village, which treats her coolly upon her arrival. Suddenly an acquaintance and former lover of Varya, a bolshevik Martynov, arrives in town he falls in love and marries Varya. The revolution begins.

== Plot ==
Before the revolution, Varvara met him at a graduation ball and later moved to a remote Siberian village. There, slowly but surely, the "city girl" wins the hearts of the locals, who are tough people engaged in gold mining. Among her students is a very talented boy, Prov Voronov, who aced all his exams to enter the gymnasium. However, the gymnasium director rejects the talented student, stating that the children of the poor will never sit at the same desk as the children of aristocrats. Varvara Vasilyevna believes that the time will come when Prov will be able to continue his education.

Martynov returns from exile, still in love with Varvara after all these years. The two marry and celebrate their wedding, but soon Martynov is arrested again. World War I follows, then the October Revolution. The new government opens up new opportunities for all people, and Varvara helps her most capable student, Prov Voronov, travel to the city to continue his education at a vocational school.

Martynov dies while serving as a commissar, and Varvara faces difficult trials in her struggle against the kulaks. The film ends with a reunion of Varvara Vasilyevna's former students after the Great Patriotic War. The now older and respected teacher is visited by the grown-up Prov Voronov, who has become a renowned scientist.

== Cast ==
- Vera Maretskaya as Varvara Vasilievna Martynova
- Pavel Olenev as Igor Petrovich, school custodian
- Daniil Sagal as Sergei Martinov
- Vladimir Lepeshinsky as Voronov
- Vladimir Maruta as Voronov, a gold miner
- Vladimir Belokurov as Bukov, a gold miner
- Anatoli Gonichev as Yefim Tsigankov, as a boy / Sergei Tsigankov, his son
- Emma Balashova as Dunya
- Roza Makagonova as Mashenka
- Aleksey Konsovsky as Kolya Sharygin
- Mikhail Gluzsky as soldier
- Rostislav Plyatt as secondary school headmaster
- Fyodor Odinokov as Bukov's guest

== See also ==
- The Village Doctor
