= Vertinskaya =

Vertinskaya, Верти́нская is a female form of Russian surname Vertinsky. Notable people with the surname include:

- Anastasiya Vertinskaya, Soviet and Russian actress
- Irina Vertinskaya (born 1984) Russian Paralympic athlete
- Lidiya Vertinskaya (1923–2013), Soviet and Russian actress and artist

== See also ==
- Aleksandr Vertinsky
