= List of Soviet films of 1948 =

A list of films produced in the Soviet Union in 1948 (see 1948 in film).

== 1948 ==
Title	Original title	Director	Cast	Genre	Notes
1948
Ballad of Siberia	Сказание о земле Сибирской	Ivan Pyryev	Vladimir Druzhnikov, Marina Ladynina, Vladimir Zeldin, Vera Vasilyeva, Boris Andreyev	Drama	The second color film
The Court of Honor	Суд чести	Abram Room	Boris Chirkov	Drama	
First-Year Student	Первоклассница	Ilya Frez	Natalya Zashchipina		
Glorious Path	Путь славы	Boris Buneev, Anatoli Rybakov, Mikhail Shvejtser	Aleksandr Antonov	Drama	
Michurin	Мичурин	Alexander Dovzhenko	Grigori Belov	Biopic	
The Precious Seed	Драгоценные зёрна	Iosif Kheifits, Aleksandr Zarkhi	Galina Kozhakina	Drama	
Red Necktie	Красный галстук	Mariya Sauts, Vladimir Sukhobokov	Aleksandr Khvylya		
The Russian Question	Русский вопрос	Mikhail Romm	Vsevolod Aksyonov, Yelena Kuzmina, Mikhail Astangov	Drama	
Tale of a True Man	Повесть о настоящем человеке	Aleksandr Stolper	Pavel Kadochnikov	Drama	
The Third Blow	Третий удар	Igor Savchenko	Aleksei Dikiy, Nikolay Bogolyubov, Ivan Pereverzev, Mark Bernes, Sergey Martinson	History, biopic, drama	
The Young Guard	Молодая гвардия	Sergei Gerasimov	Vladimir Ivanov, Inna Makarova, Nonna Mordyukova, Sergei Gurzo	War film	
Three Encounters	Три встречи	Aleksandr Ptushko, Vsevolod Pudovkin, Sergei Yutkevich	Tamara Makarova	Drama	

== See also ==
- 1948 in the Soviet Union
