= Gubarev =

Gubarev (masculine form) or Gubareva (feminine form) may refer to:

- Aleksei Gubarev - Soviet cosmonaut
- Ekaterina Gubareva - Donbass politician
- Pavel Gubarev — Pro-Russian Ukrainian politician/separatist.
- Sergey Gubarev - Kazakhstani water polo player
- Vitali Gubarev — Russian writer, author of Kingdom of Crooked Mirrors
