= Barbara the Fair with the Silken Hair =

1970 film

- Polish theatrical poster
- Directed by: Alexander Rou
- Written by: Mikhail Chuprin; Aleksandr Rowe
- Based on: The Tale of Tsar Berendey by Vasily Zhukovsky
- Starring: Mikhail Pugovkin; Georgy Millyar; Anatoly Kubatsky
- Cinematography: Dmitri Surensky
- Edited by: Kseniya Blinova
- Music by: Arkadi Filippenko
- Production company: Gorky Film Studio
- Release date: 30 December 1970
- Running time: 85 minutes
- Country: Soviet Union
- Language: Russian

Barbara the Fair with the Silken Hair (Russian: Варвара-краса, длинная коса, romanized: Varvara-krasa, dlinnaya kosa) is a 1970 Soviet fantasy film directed by Alexander Rou and based on the fairy tale ''The Tale of Tsar Berendey'' by Vasily Zhukovsky.

The film premiered December 30, 1970.

A humble fisherman's son and a spoiled prince cross paths in a fantastical quest involving magic, deception, and love, as they both vie for the hand of a powerful underwater princess.

== Plot ==
King Yeremey, eager to count everything in his kingdom, embarks on a year-long journey. On his way home, he stops for water at a forest well, only to be seized by the underwater king, Chudo-Yudo, who demands that Yeremey give him "what he doesn't know he has." Assuming he has nothing to lose, Yeremey agrees, only to return home and discover that his son, Andrei, was born during his absence. Unwilling to part with his son, Yeremey and his devious advisor devise a plan to switch Andrei with a fisherman’s child, but the advisor’s wife has a change of heart and returns the children to their original places. Years pass, and Andrei, raised as a prince, grows spoiled and lazy, while Andrei the fisherman's son becomes kind and hardworking, beloved by the king, who mistakenly believes him to be his true son.

Underwater, Chudo-Yudo plans a wedding for his daughter, the sorceress Varvara, who desires a loving husband from the human world. When she hears of her father’s deal with the land king, Chudo-Yudo begins to pressure Yeremey for his due. Mistakenly identifying the fisherman’s son as his own, Yeremey sends Andrei the prince into Chudo-Yudo’s realm, where he fails Varvara's tests due to his selfishness. Meanwhile, Andrei the fisherman's son arrives, bravely passing Varvara's tests with kindness, and they fall in love. Furious, Chudo-Yudo tries to keep Varvara and the fisherman’s son, but with the help of magical allies, they escape. The spoiled prince betrays them, but Varvara turns him into a dog. On land, the advisor’s wife reveals the truth of the failed child swap, reconciling all. Andrei the fisherman marries Varvara, while the humbled king reclaims his foolish son.

== Cast ==
- Mikhail Pugovkin as tsar Yeremei (the king)
- Georgy Millyar as Chudo-Yudo (slavic monster, the underwater king)
- Anatoly Kubatsky as Afonya, dyak
- Aleksei Katyshev as Andrey, son of a fisherman
- Sergei Nikolaev as Andrey, the tsar's son
- Tatiana Klyueva as Varvara-beauty, daughter of Chudo-Yudo
- Varvara Popova as Stepanida, nanny
- Most real pirates:
  - Alexander Khvylya as Duc de la Bull
  - Lev Potyomkin as Marquis de la Kis
  - Arkady Zinman as Baron de la Pig
  - Isaac Leongarov as Viscount de la Dog
- Boris Sichkin as Groom-prestidigitator
- Valentina Ananina as fisherwoman
- Vera Altayskaya as starushka-veselushka (old lady jester)
- Anastasia Zuyeva as narrator

== Interesting facts ==
- The shooting took place on the banks of the Moscow River, near the Pioneer Camp Mirny, the name of Sergei Kirov (at Moscow Institute of Thermal), located near the village of Anikovo village of Odintsovsky District, Moscow Oblast.
