= Natalya Sedykh =

Figure skater, ballet dancer, film actor

Natalya Yevgenyevna Sedykh (Russian: Ната́лья Евге́ньевна Седы́х) (born 10 July 1948) is a Russian retired figure skater, ballet dancer, and film actor.

Sedykh was born in Moscow. As a very young girl, she was enthralled by a television broadcast of figure skating. She began skating at the age of four, and became known as "the smallest skater in the Soviet Union". A 1962 televised version of The Dying Swan brought her to the attention of director Aleksander Rou, who cast her as the ingenuous heroine Nastyenka in his 1964 fairy tale film Jack Frost, and also in his 1968 film Fire, Water, and Brass Pipes.

In 1969, Sedykh graduated ballet school at the Bolshoi Theater and joined the theater's company, first as a member of the corps de ballet and later as a soloist. She toured internationally in The Sleeping Beauty, The Nutcracker, The Seagull, and Anna Karenina, in which she danced alongside Maya Plisetskaya and Māris Liepa.

She married the composer Victor Lebedev and moved to Leningrad. Her former boyfriend, a fellow artist from the Bolshoi, was so consumed by jealousy that he followed her to Leningrad and attempted to strangle her, then threatened her with a knife. She managed to escape without injury, but was severely shaken. Her assailant went abroad shortly afterwards. She remained married to Lebedev for ten years, and they had one son, Alexei.

In 1990, Sedykh joined the company of Mark Rozovsky's Nikitsky Gate Theater in Moscow, where she continues to perform.
