= Pavel Pavlenko =

- Born: Pavel Pavlovich Pavlenko; 20 September 1902; Kiev, Russian Empire
- Died: 9 March 1993 (aged 90); Moscow, Russian Federation
- Occupation: Actor
- Years active: 1920–1976

Pavel Pavlovich Pavlenko (Russian: Павел Павлович Павленко) (20 September 1902 – 9 March 1993) was a Soviet stage and film actor.

== Life ==
Born in Kiev, he later moved to Moscow and graduated in 1919 from the Moscow City Theatrical School named for Anatoly Lunacharsky. He tried to join the Moscow Operetta, but was rejected by Grigory Yaron, who said, "We do not need a second Yaron!"

He debuted on the stage in 1920. He worked in the Moscow Ukrainian Theater, in the Children's Theater, and elsewhere. During the Great Patriotic War, he played in the Mossovet Theatre.

After the war, he appeared more frequently in films, and was a favorite of Aleksandr Rou. His film career came to an end in the late seventies. He died in obscurity in Moscow in 1993.

== Filmography ==
- 1946 – The Great Glinka (Глинка) as Faddey Bulgarin
- 1952 – Composer Glinka (Композитор Глинка) as Faddey Bulgarin
- 1952 – The Inspector (Ревизор) as Superintendent of Schools
- 1953 – Attack from the Sea (Корабли штурмуют бастионы) as Paul I of Russia
- 1957 – The Height (Высота) as Old installer
- 1957 – The Duel (Поединок) as Svetlovidov
- 1958 – The Captain's Daughter (Капитанская дочка) as Solomin
- 1958 – Our Correspondent (Наш корреспондент) as Fedotov
- 1960 – Summer Vacation (Время летних отпусков) as Boroday
- 1960 – Fishers of Sponges (Ловцы губок) as Baburis
- 1963 – Kingdom of Crooked Mirrors (Королевство Кривых Зеркал) as Master of ceremonies
- 1963 – Lost Summer (Пропало лето) as Grandfather Yevgeny
- 1963 – The Big Fuse (Большой фитиль) as Assistant to the Chairman
- 1964 – Jack Frost as Nastya's father
- 1966 – The Ugly Story (Скверный анекдот) as Akim Petrovich Zubikov
- 1967 – Fire, Water, and Brass Pipes (Огонь, вода и… медные трубы) as Vodyanoy
- 1968 – The Little Golden Calf (Золотой телёнок) as Funt
- 1968 – The Brothers Karamazov (Братья Карамазовы) as Zosima
- 1969 – Adam and Heva (Адам и Хева) as Old Dagestani
- 1970 – You Are Taimyr (Вас вызывает Таймыр) as Grandfather Babourine
- 1970 – Carousel (Карусель) as Ivan
- 1973 – Much Ado About Nothing (Много шума из ничего) as Dogberry
- 1976 – Twelve Chairs (12 стульев) as Club guard
