= Pavel Olenev =

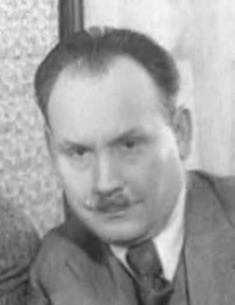
- Born: 25 January 1898; Moscow
- Died: 19 January 1964 (aged 65); Moscow
- Occupation: Actor

Pavel Olenev (Russian: Павел Алексеевич Оленев; 1898 – 1964) was a Soviet and Russian film actor.

He died on 19 January 1964 in Moscow, RSFSR, USSR, and was buried at the Vagankovo Cemetery.

== Filmography ==
Year	Title	Role	Notes
1932	Dela i lyudi		
1934	Lyubov Alyony	Vanya	
1936	Zaklyuchonnye	Sasha	
1938	Volga-Volga	Kuzma Ivanovich, water carrier / chef	
1939	A Girl with a Temper	Bobrik, director of the fur store	
1940	V poiskakh radosti	Mitka Spirin	
1940	Tanya	Kurnakov	
1941	Boyevoy kinosbornik 7		
1942	Kontsert frontu	Lieutenant	Uncredited
1946	Sinegoriya	Dron / Master	
1947	The First Glove	Savelich, arena manager	
1947	The Village Teacher	Yegor - Petrovich	
1948	Dragotsennye zyorna	Chauffeur Klimov	
1948	The Precious Seed	Press photographer	Uncredited
1950	Far from Moscow	Merzlyakov	
1951	Sporting Honour		
1953	Varvary		
1956	Krylya	Filipp	(final film role)
