= 1946 in the Soviet Union =

- Decades: 1920s; 1930s; 1940s; 1950s; 1960s
- See also: History of the Soviet Union; List of years in the Soviet Union

The following lists events that happened during 1946 in the Union of Soviet Socialist Republics.

== Incumbents ==
- General Secretary of the Communist Party of the Soviet Union — Joseph Stalin
- Chairman of the Presidium of the Supreme Soviet of the Soviet Union — Mikhail Kalinin (until 19 March), Nikolay Shvernik (starting 19 March)
- Chairman of the Council of Ministers of the Soviet Union — Joseph Stalin

== Events ==
=== February ===
- February 10 — Legislation Elections are held for the first time in nearly a decade.

=== December ===
- December 15 — the Iran crisis of 1946 ends with the Dissolution of the Azerbaijan People's Government and the Republic of Mahabad following the withdraw of the last remaining Soviet troops from Iran.

== Births ==
- January 15 — Valentin Dubinin, Acting Governor of Primorsky Krai
- January 18 — Victoria Fyodorova, Russian-American actress and author (d. 2012)
- January 24 — Vasily Zakharyashchev, politician (d. 2023)
- February 13 — Lev Korshunov, 2nd Governor of Altai Krai
- February 22 — Nagima Aitkhozhina, Kazakh biologist (d. 2020)
- February 26 — Viktor Kazantsev, envoy of the Russian President to the Southern Federal District (d. 2021)
- March 23 — Lyudmila Byakova, Russian seamstress
- March 25 — Anatoly Guzhvin, 1st Governor of Astrakhan Oblast (d. 2004)
- April 2 — Beno Axionov, Russian-Moldovan actor, director, drama teacher and screenwriter
- April 22 — Allahverdi Baghirov, Azerbaijani officer (d. 1992)
- April 25 — Vladimir Zhirinovsky, Founder and 1st Leader of the Liberal Democratic Party of Russia (d. 2022)
- May 14 — Anatoliy Zheglanov, Soviet and Russian ski jumper (d. 1999)
- May 17 — Galina Starovoytova, dissident (d. 1998)
- June 2 — Valery Fateyev, 1st Governor of Smolensk Oblast
- July 18 — Kanat Saudabayev, 6th State Counsellor of Kazakhstan
- July 23 — Alexander Kaidanovsky, Soviet and Russian actor and film director (d. 1995)
- July 25 — Vasily Dyakonov, 1st Governor of Krasnodar Krai (d. 2012)
- August 3 — Nikolai Burlyayev, Soviet and Russian actor and film director
- August 4 — Ramazan Abdulatipov, 4th Head of the Republic of Dagestan
- August 15 — Anatoly Kvashnin, 4th Chief of the General Staff of the Russian Armed Forces (d. 2022)
- August 19 — Zoja Rudnova, Soviet and Russian international table tennis player (d. 2014)
- August 20 — Valentin Vlasov, 2nd Mayor of Arkhangelsk (d. 2020)
- August 26 — Liana Isakadze, Georgian violinist and conductor (d. 2024)
- September 10 — Semen Gluzman, Ukrainian psychiatrist and human rights activist (d. 2026)
- September 13 — Henri Kuprashvili, Georgian swimmer
- September 21
  - Mikhail Kovalchuk, Russian physicist and official
  - Mart Siimann, 12th Prime Minister of Estonia
- October 4 — Yevgeny Kharitonov, 3rd Governor of Krasnodar Krai
- October 6 — Yekaterina Gradova, Soviet and Russian film actress (d. 2021)
- October 8 — Aleksandr Gorshkov, Soviet and Russian ice dancer (d. 2022)
- November 22 — Oleg Kagan, violinist (d. 1990)
- November 27 — Nina Maslova, Soviet and Russian actress
- December 31 — Lyudmila Pakhomova, ice dancer (d. 1986)

== Deaths ==
- January 2 — Fabijan Abrantovich, civic and religious leader (b. 1884)
- May 1 — Israfil Mammadov, Red Army lieutenant (b. 1919)
- May 13 — Aleksei Bach, biochemist and revolutionary (b. 1857)
- June 3 — Mikhail Kalinin, 1st Chairman of the Presidium of the Supreme Soviet of the Soviet Union (b. 1875)
- July 8 — Alexander Alexandrov, composer (b. 1883)
- July 26 — Alexander Vvedensky, Orthodox religious leader (b. 1889)
- August 1
  - Andrey Vlasov, commander of the Russian Liberation Army (b. 1901)
  - Sergei Bunyachenko, Red Army defector (b. 1902)
  - Fyodor Truhin, major general and defector during WWII (b. 1896)
- November 4 — Semyon Bychkov, military pilot and defector during WWII (b. 1918)
- November 11 — Nikolay Burdenko, surgeon (b. 1876)
- November 18 — Vincentas Borisevičius, Roman Catholic Bishop of the Telsiai Diocese (b. 1887)
- December 6 — Maximilian Steinberg, composer of classical music (b. 1883)

== See also ==
- 1946 in fine arts of the Soviet Union
- List of Soviet films of 1946
