= Vera Altayskaya =

Soviet actress

- Born: 21 May 1919; Petrograd, Soviet Russia
- Died: 28 December 1978 (aged 59); Moscow, Russian SFSR, Soviet Union
- Occupation: Film actor
- Years active: 1939–1976
- Spouse: Aleksei Konsovsky
- Relatives: Konstantin Altaysky-Korolyov (father)
- Awards: Medal "For Valiant Labour in the Great Patriotic War 1941–1945"

Vera Vladimirovna Altayskaya (Russian: Ве́ра Влади́мировна Алта́йская) (21 May 1919 – 28 December 1978) was a Soviet actress known for her roles in children's fairy tale films and comedies.

== Early life ==
Born in Petrograd, she was the adoptive daughter of Konstantin Altaysky-Korolyov, a poet and translator, and his wife Vera Petrovna, a pianist.

== Career ==
In the late 1930s she moved to Moscow, where in 1940 she graduated from drama school at the Mosfilm studio and joined the studio's repertoire of actors. Her first prominent role was in Yuli Raizman's 1942 film Mashenka.

She married Aleksei Konsovsky, a fellow actor, with whom she had a daughter, Svetlana. In recognition of her film work during the 1940s she received the Medal "For Valiant Labour in the Great Patriotic War 1941–1945".

In Mashenka, Altayskaya had played a young beauty, but she later transitioned to character roles. For most of her career, she was typecast as shrewish or matronly characters. She appeared in many children's fairy-tale films, most notably Aleksandr Rou's 1964 film Jack Frost, in which she played a domineering stepmother.

== Death ==
She died in Moscow after a brief illness, and her ashes are interred in the columbarium of Vagankovo Cemetery alongside those of her adoptive parents.

== Selected filmography ==
- Tanya (Светлый путь, 1940) as Claudia
- Mashenka (Машенька, 1942) as Vera
- The Ural Front (Большая земля, 1944) as Antonina Ushakova
- It Happened in the Donbass (Это было в Донбассе, 1945) as Marusya Shelkoplyas
- The Liberated Earth (Освобожденная земля, 1946) as Tanya
- Dream of a Cossack (Кавалер золотой звезды, 1951) as Collective Farm Girl (uncredited)
- A Groom from the Other World (Жених с того света, 1958) as Nina Pavlovna
- The Magic Weaver (Марья-искусница, 1959) as Aunt Nepogodushka
- Vechera na khutore bliz Dikanki (Вечера на хуторе близ Диканьки, 1961) as Panas's wife
- Kingdom of Crooked Mirrors (Королевство кривых зеркал, 1963) as Asirk, cook
- Morozko (Морозко, 1964) as Nastenka's stepmother
- Fire, Water, and Brass Pipes (Огонь, вода и медные трубы, 1968) as Baba Yaga's daughter
- Varvara-beauty, long braid (Варвара-краса, длинная коса, 1970) as old-veselushka
- The Golden Horns (Золотые рога, 1973) as Cook
