= Kingdom of Crooked Mirrors (2007 film) =

- Directed by: Alexander Igudin
- Starring: Maria and Anastasia Tolmachevy; Alla Pugacheva; Dima Bilan; Philip Kirkorov; Nikolay Baskov
- Country of origin: Russian Federation
- Original language: Russian

Production
- Producer: Gennady Gokhshtein
- Running time: 90 minutes
- Production company: VGTRK

Original release
- Network: Telekanal Rossiya
- Release: 31 December 2007

Kingdom of Crooked Mirrors (Russian: Королевство кривых зеркал, translit. Korolevstvo krivykh zerkal) is a 2007 Russian fairy tale musical film directed by Alexander Igudin based on the novel, Kingdom of Crooked Mirrors, by Vitali Gubarev. It is also a remake of the 1963 film of the same name. Junior Eurovision winners Masha and Nastya Tolmachevy starred in this version.

The film also stars Russian pop icon Alla Pugacheva, Ukrainian singer Sofia Rotaru, Russia's 2006 and 2008 Eurovision representative Dima Bilan and others.

On New Year's broadcast on December 31, 2007, the film “The Kingdom of Crooked Mirrors” received a rating of 9.6 with a share of 22.5, which provided it with 6th position in the TOP 10 most popular programs on New Year's broadcast. The film is also available to watch on YouTube.

== Plot ==
On New Year's Eve 2007-2008, young Masha and Nastya want to become show business stars. While watching TV, they magically find themselves in the looking glass of the Kingdom of Show Business.

The Kingdom hosts the “Crooked Vision” competition (an allusion to Eurovision), the main event of which is King Yagupop. The producer and director of the competition ask Queen Anidag and the kite Pilifa to send out invitations to the participating countries, but they ignore the request because they themselves want to participate in the competition.

Masha and Nastya become witnesses to the deception, which is why they are forced to try to get into the competition themselves. After many trials and adventures, Masha and Nastya still manage to take part in the competition.

After their performance, prima donna Alla Pugacheva appears, blessing the aspiring singers for a career in show business.

== Cast ==
- Masha Tolmacheva — Masha
- Nastya Tolmacheva — Nastya
- Alla Pugacheva — prima donna
- Sofia Rotaru — queen
- Dima Bilan — Gurd, stage worker
- Nikolai Baskov — Yagupop
- Philip Kirkorov — Pilif
- Lolita Milyavskaya — Anidag
- Yuri Galtsev — Abazh
- Yuri Stoyanov — producer from USA
- Ilya Oleynikov — director
- Kristina Orbakaitė — Indian woman
- Natasha Koroleva, Sergei Glushko — Brazilians
