= Kingdom of Crooked Mirrors =

- Soviet billboard theatrical poster of the film Nushrok, Abazh and Anidag trio (top); Olya and Yalo (bottom)
- Directed by: Aleksandr Rou
- Written by: Lev Arkadyev; Vitali Gubarev
- Starring: Olga Yukina; Tatyana Yukina; Andrei Fajt; Arkadi Tsinman; Lidiya Vertinskaya
- Music by: Arkady Filippenko
- Distributed by: Gorky Film Studio
- Release date: 1963
- Running time: 80 minutes
- Country: Soviet Union
- Language: Russian

Kingdom of Crooked Mirrors (Russian: Королевство кривых зеркал, translit. Korolevstvo krivykh zerkal) is a 1963 Soviet fairy tale film directed by Aleksandr Rou based on the novel, Kingdom of Crooked Mirrors, by Vitali Gubarev.

At the end of 2007, Russia TV filmed a musical remake with the same name, featuring stars Nikolay Baskov, Alla Pugacheva, and the Tolmachevy Sisters. The original film contains introduction music and a fairytale style of the early 1960s. It is also notable for its use of actual twins in the leading roles.

== Plot summary ==
The film centers around an encounter between a girl named Olya and a mysterious counterpart, Yalo, while staring into a mirror. The characters are exact opposites: Yalo is the absolute opposite of Olya in every way. Where Yalo is organized and precise, Olya is careless and absent-minded. In the story, Olya steps through the mirror into the Kingdom of Crooked Mirrors where Yalo resides. The kingdom, under the rule of King Yagupop LXXVII (reverse of Popugay, meaning parrot), produces crooked mirrors that brainwash its people through subtle changes in reality. When Yalo's friend, a boy named Gurd (reverse of Drug, meaning friend), is suddenly imprisoned for refusing to make crooked mirrors by the evil leaders Anidag (reverse of Gadina, meaning snake), Nushrok (reverse of Korshun, meaning kite) and Abazh (reverse of Zhaba, meaning toad), Olya decides to accompany Yalo to rescue him.

They meet a character who introduces herself as Aunt Aksal (reverse of Laska, meaning kindness), one of the king's cooks, who in order to help them reach the king and save Gurd, disguises them as pages of the king. On meeting the king, Anidag, Nushrok, and Abazh reveal themselves to be the actual powers behind the throne. The latter half of the story focuses on their ultimate defeat and the rescue of Gurd with the help of Anidag's humiliated old servant Bar (reverse of Rab, meaning slave), who rebels against his master. The kingdom's mirrors are returned to normal, and its society becomes free. Olya at last returns to her home and lives happily ever after with her grandmother.

It has been suggested the story is directed at the perceived hypocrisy of western nations in attacking the Soviet propaganda machine during the Cold War.

== Cast ==
- Olga Yukina as Olya
- Tatyana Yukina as Aylo
- Tatyana Barysheva as Grandmother
- Anatoly Kubatsky as King Torrap LXXVII
- Andrei Fajt as Kwah
- Lidiya Vertinskaya as Elitper
- Arkadi Tsinman as Gorg
- Andrei Stapran as Dneirf
- Ivan Kuznetsov as Evals
- Georgi Millyar as Grand Master of ceremonies
- Pavel Pavlenko as Master of ceremonies
- Tamara Nosova as Aunt Lesaew
- Vera Altayskaya as Esuom
- Alexander Khvylya as the royal chef
- Valentin Bryleyev as tambourmajor
