= Jack Frost (1964 film) =

1964 Soviet film

- English-language theatrical one-sheet
- Directed by: Alexander Rou
- Written by: Nikolai Erdman; Mikhail Volpin
- Based on: Morozko
- Starring: Alexander Khvylya; Natalya Sedykh; Eduard Izotov; Inna Churikova; Pavel Pavlenko; Vera Altayskaya; Georgy Millyar
- Narrated by: Dorothy Brown Green (US version)
- Cinematography: Dmitri Surensky
- Music by: Nikolai Budashkin
- Production company: Gorky Film Studios
- Distributed by: Gorky Film Studios
- Release date: 1964
- Running time: 84 minutes
- Country: Soviet Union
- Language: Russian

Jack Frost (Russian: Морозко, Morozko) is a 1964 Soviet romantic fantasy film made by Gorky Film Studio. It was based on a traditional Russian fairy tale Morozko. It was directed by Alexander Rou, and starred Eduard Izotov as Ivan, Natalya Sedykh as Nastenka, and Alexander Khvylya as Father Frost. The script was written by Nikolai Erdman. The soundtrack was composed by Nikolai Budashkin, who was inspired by the works of Nikolai Rimsky-Korsakov. A version with an English dub was released in 1966 in the U.S. and was spoofed on the TV series Mystery Science Theater 3000.

== Plot ==
A blended family lives on a farm in a village in the mountains. The man is kind and has a daughter named Nastenka, who is kind, beautiful, and hardworking. The woman is cruel and gives Nastenka many household chores, favoring her own daughter, Marfushka, who is rude, ugly, and lazy.

One spring, in the very early morning, just before the sun would come up, when both the daughters are young adult women, Nastenka is knitting a sock when her stepmother tells her to go outside and finish before sunrise. Nastenka asks the sun to hold back a little longer so she can finish in time and the sun does so.

Meanwhile in another village nearby, a young man named Ivan leaves his home and heads out to see the world. While traveling, in the summer, Ivan is accosted by bandits, but he outsmarts them by throwing their clubs away. Later, Ivan meets Father Mushroom, who gives Ivan a bow and quiver of arrows. He asks Ivan to bow to him to show thanks, but Ivan claims that a bear may bow to Father Mushroom but Ivan will not. Ivan reaches a lake where he meets Nastenka and her dog. Lovestruck, he asks her to marry him. To prove his worth, he attempts to shoot a mother bear with her cubs. Nastenka stops him, and Father Mushroom, watching nearby, casts a spell that changes Ivan into a bear. Nastenka is startled and faints. Ivan sees his reflection, accuses Nastenka of being a witch and runs off. Ivan meets Father Mushroom again, who scolds Ivan over his selfish nature. Thinking that all he must do to change back is a good deed, Ivan seeks out people, demanding to know how he can help them; however having a bear's body terrifies them. He comes across an old blind woman carrying sticks to her home and carries her home. Father Mushroom, pleased at Ivan's selflessness, restores him to human form.

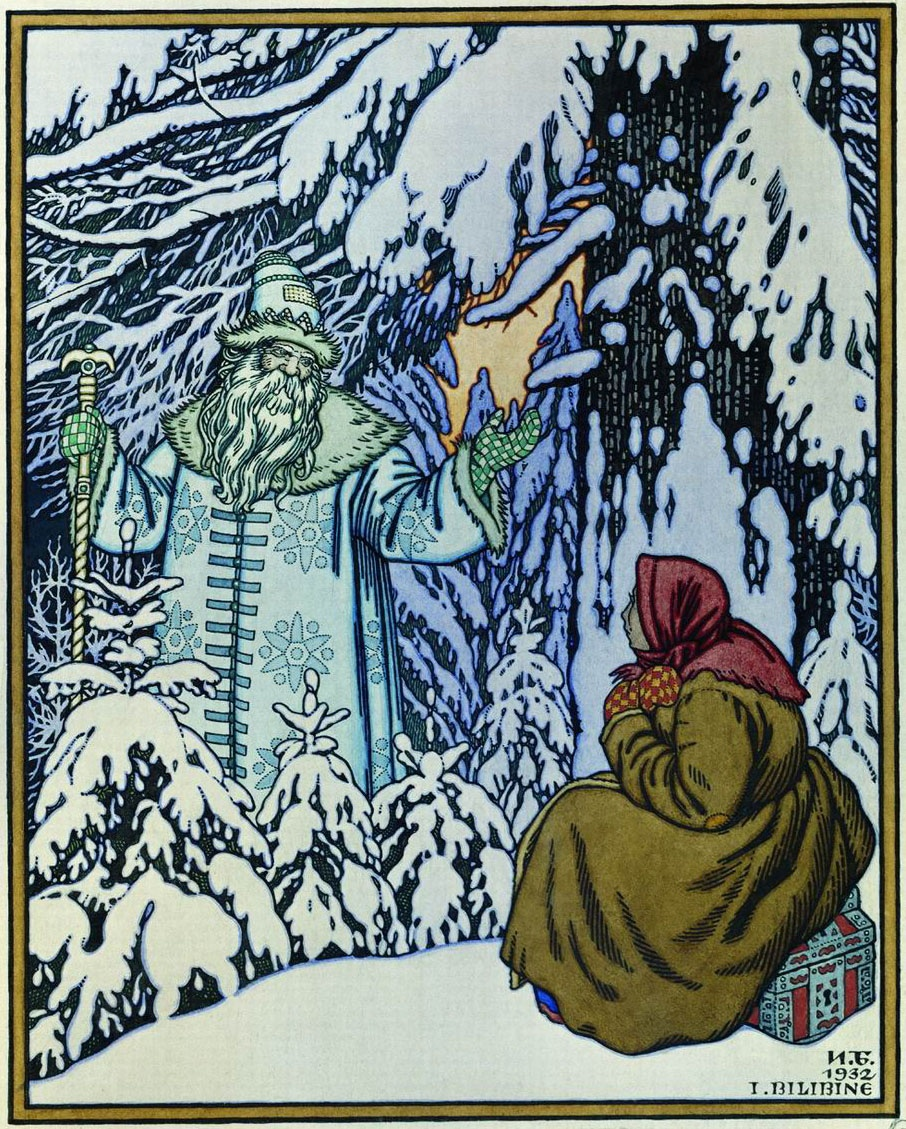
Illustration by Ivan Bilibin.

Meanwhile, Nastenka's stepmother tries to marry off Marfushka. In the fall, she dresses Marfushka in fine clothes while putting mud on Nastenka's face to make her ugly. A wealthy suitor comes and asks Marfushka, who has never done a day's work, to prepare a meal for him. While chasing geese at a pond, Marfushka falls into the pond and nearly drowns until she is rescued by Nastenka. Marfushka's makeup and the mud on Nastenka's face wash away, and the suitor chooses Nastenka for a bride instead. As winter starts, the stepmother orders her husband to leave Nastenka in the woods. On the way, the father decides to bring Nastenka back home. Believing her stepmother will punish him, Nastenka flees. While sitting under a tree, she meets Father Frost bringing winter to the woods, who rescues her from freezing and brings her to his home.

Ivan encounters Baba Yaga, whom he asks for aid to find Nastenka. She refuses to help, but Ivan tricks her and threatens to bake the witch in her own oven until she tells him how to find Nastenka. After he leaves, Baba Yaga sends her black cat to harm Nastenka before Ivan can reach her. The enchanted sled sent by Baba Yaga to show Ivan the way to Nastenka leaves him trapped in a snowbank. While Father Frost is out walking, the cat tricks Nastenka into touching his staff, which freezes her and sends her into a deep slumber. Nastenka's dog leads Ivan to her. Ivan apologizes for his rude behavior, pleading for her to return to life; she is revived. Father Frost gives Nastenka and Ivan a large dowry of jewels and a horse-driven sleigh for their impending marriage.

They return to Nastenka's village, where her father is happy to see his beloved daughter, and he welcomes Ivan as his son-in-law, but Marfushka and her mother eye their fortune and demand the same. While Nastenka and Ivan and Nastenka's dog are traveling to Ivan's village, they are attacked by the bandits Ivan encountered in the summer along with Baba Yaga. The bandits overpower them until the clubs from before come down and knock out the bandits and Baba Yaga is chased away by the dog. Meanwhile, when Marfushka tries to duplicate Nastenka's adventure in the forest, Father Frost is so horrified by her rudeness that he sends her back on a pig-driven sleigh, with a box full of crows as a dowry. The father stands up for himself and regains his place as head of the household. Nastenka and Ivan have a lovely wedding.

== Cast ==
- Alexander Khvylya as Morozko (Jack Frost in Russian culture)
- Natalya Sedykh as Nastenka (called Nastia for short)
- Eduard Izotov as Ivan
- Inna Churikova as Marfushka
- Pavel Pavlenko as Nastia's father
- Vera Altayskaya as Nastia's stepmother
- Georgy Millyar as Baba Yaga
- Galina Borisova as Starichok-Borovichok (voiced by Mikhail Yanshin)
- Anatoly Kubatsky as Bandit Chief
- Valentin Bryleev as Suitor
- Tatyana Pelttser as Suitor's mother
- Tatyana Barysheva as Matchmaker
- Varvara Popova as Old Blind Woman
- Zinaida Vorkul as Ivan's mother
- Anastasia Zuyeva as The Storyteller

== Awards ==
- In 1965, the film won the Grand Prize – Lion of San Marco at the 26th Venice International Film Festival in a program of children's and youth films.
- 1966 - All-Union Film Festival - Prize for the best film in the category for children's films.
- For the role of Marfushka, the Czech Ambassador Jaroslav Bašta gave Inna Churikova the silver medal of Masaryk.

== Legacy ==
The original Russian version was released on DVD in 2000 by Ruscico under the cover title Morozko. It has nine different subtitle options including English, as well as Russian, English and French audio tracks and special features. It was previously released on VHS by United Home Video under the title Magical Wonderland.

In 1997, the English-dubbed Jack Frost version was featured on the movie-mocking television show Mystery Science Theater 3000 as experiment (episode) #813; it was released on DVD July 13, 2010 as part of the series' Volume XVIII DVD set. This episode is also Jim Mallon's last episode as Gypsy.

The video game Fairy Tale About Father Frost, Ivan and Nastya is heavily inspired by the movie.

In 2009, Neil Cicierega produced "Ivanushka", a demo based on the plot of the film, which would later be adapted into the Spirit Phone track "Touch-Tone Telephone". The original version was eventually released to Neil Cicierega's Patreon in January 2018.

At the end of 2010, Russia 1 remade the film into a musical starring Nikolai Baskov.

== See also ==
- Pictures at an Exhibition
- The Magic Voyage of Sinbad
- The Day the Earth Froze
