= 1946 in fine arts of the Soviet Union =

Monument to Lenin
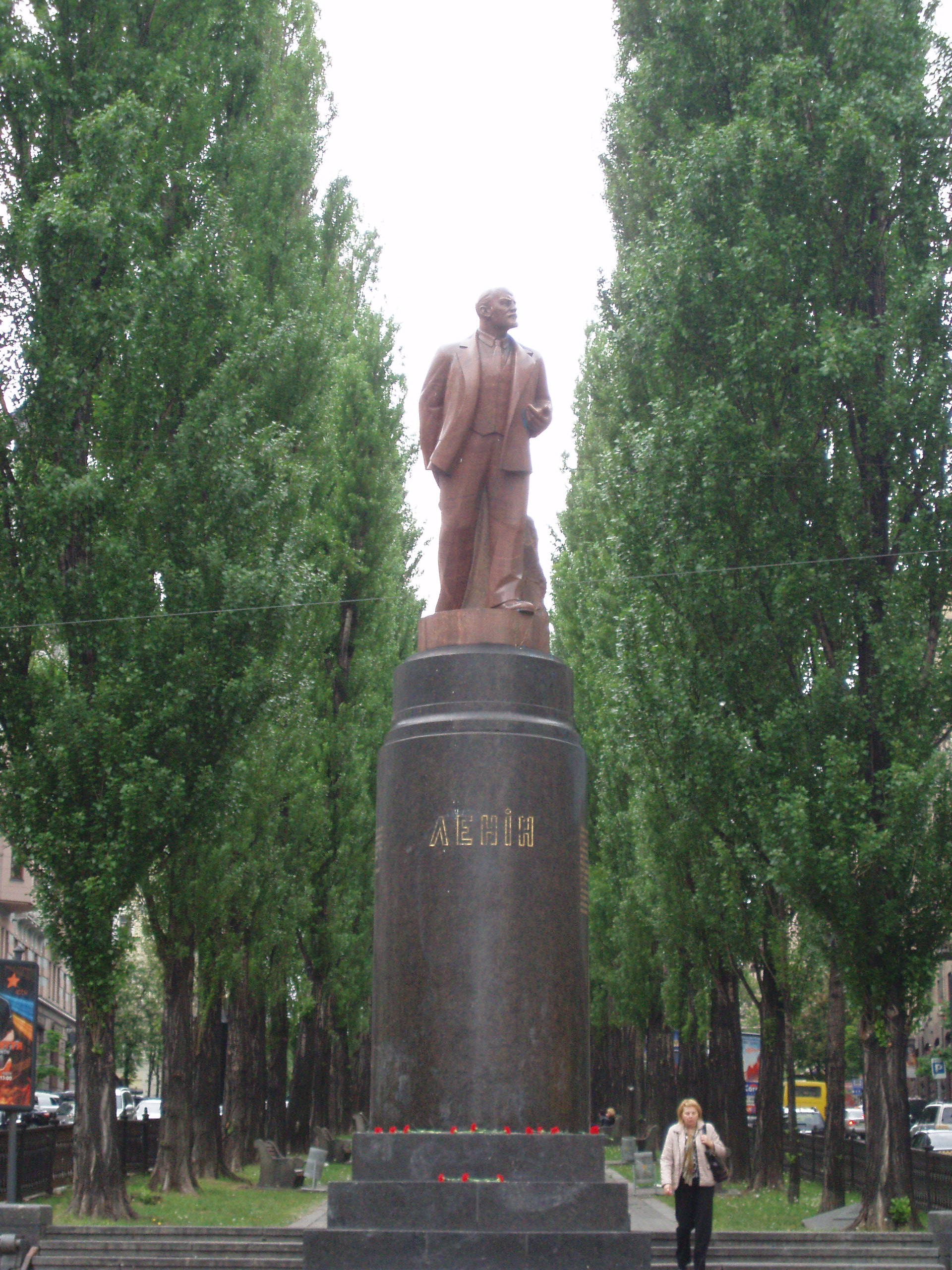
- Artist: Sergei Merkurov
- Year: 1946
- Location: Boulevard of Taras Shevchenko; Kiev

The year 1946 was marked by many events that left an imprint on the history of Soviet and Russian fine arts.

== Events ==
- The Repin Institute of Arts graduated young artists Taisia Afoninf, Raisa Getman, Alexander Gulayev, Alexei Kuznetsov, Alexei Mozhaev, Andrei Mylnikov, Piotr Puko, Vasily Sokolov, Nadezhda Shteinmiller, and others.
- January 19 – All-Union Fine Art Exhibition of 1946 was opened in Tretyakov gallery in Moscow. Over 1500 works of 555 artists were exhibited. The participants were Mikhail Avilov, Konstantin Belokurov, Mikhail Bobyshov, Fiodor Bogorodsky, Alexander Bubnov, Alexander Vedernikov, Georgy Vereysky, Aleksandr Gerasimov, Sergey Gerasimov, Gavriil Gorelov, Aleksei Gritsai, Aleksandr Deyneka, Nikolai Dormidonyov, Vasily Yefanov, Krum Dzhakov, Sergei Zakharov, Maria Zubreeva, Igor Krestovsky, Alexander Laktionov, Alexander Matveyev, Alexander Osmerkin, Gerta Nemenova, Mikhail Platunov, Konstantin Rudakov, Alexander Samokhvalov, and other important soviet artists.
- May 9 – After post-war restoration the State Russian museum was again opened for visitors.
- Exhibition of works by Vladimir Grinberg (1896–1942) was opened in the Leningrad Union of Artists.
- Exhibition of works by Nikolai Tyrsa (1887–1942) was opened in the Leningrad Union of Artists.
- December 5 – The Monument to Vladimir Lenin was unveiled in Kiev. Authors of the monument sculptor Sergei Merkurov. Before setting in Kiev a sculpture was exhibited in a soviet pavilion on the World Exhibition of 1939 in New York.

== Deaths ==
- September 13 – Eugene Lanceray (Russian: Лансере Евгений Евгеньевич), Russian soviet graphic artist, People's Artist of the Russian Federation, Stalin Prize winner (born 1875).
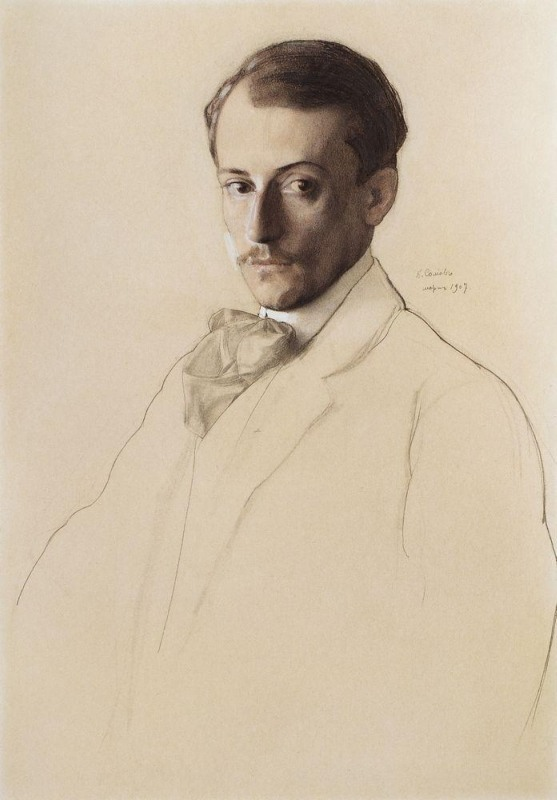
E. Lanceray

== See also ==
- List of Russian artists
- List of painters of Leningrad Union of Artists
- Saint Petersburg Union of Artists
- Russian culture
- 1946 in the Soviet Union

== Sources ==
- Всесоюзная художественная выставка. Живопись. Скульптура. Графика. Каталог. М., ГТГ, 1946.
- Каталог выставки живописи, графики, скульптуры художников-фронтовиков. М., МССХ, 1946.
- Artists of Peoples of the USSR. Biography Dictionary. Vol. 1. Moscow, Iskusstvo, 1970.
- Artists of Peoples of the USSR. Biography Dictionary. Vol. 2. Moscow, Iskusstvo, 1972.
- Directory of Members of Union of Artists of USSR. Volume 1,2. Moscow, Soviet Artist Edition, 1979.
- Directory of Members of the Leningrad branch of the Union of Artists of Russian Federation. Leningrad, Khudozhnik RSFSR, 1980.
- Artists of Peoples of the USSR. Biography Dictionary. Vol. 4 Book 1. Moscow, Iskusstvo, 1983.
- Directory of Members of the Leningrad branch of the Union of Artists of Russian Federation. – Leningrad: Khudozhnik RSFSR, 1987.
- Персональные и групповые выставки советских художников. 1917–1947 гг. М., Советский художник, 1989.
- Artists of peoples of the USSR. Biography Dictionary. Vol. 4 Book 2. – Saint Petersburg: Academic project humanitarian agency, 1995.
- Link of Times: 1932 – 1997. Artists – Members of Saint Petersburg Union of Artists of Russia. Exhibition catalogue. – Saint Petersburg: Manezh Central Exhibition Hall, 1997.
- Matthew C. Bown. Dictionary of 20th Century Russian and Soviet Painters 1900-1980s. – London: Izomar, 1998.
- Vern G. Swanson. Soviet Impressionism. – Woodbridge, England: Antique Collectors' Club, 2001.
- Время перемен. Искусство 1960—1985 в Советском Союзе. СПб., Государственный Русский музей, 2006.
- Sergei V. Ivanov. Unknown Socialist Realism. The Leningrad School. – Saint-Petersburg: NP-Print Edition, 2007. – ISBN 5-901724-21-6, ISBN 978-5-901724-21-7.
- Anniversary Directory graduates of Saint Petersburg State Academic Institute of Painting, Sculpture, and Architecture named after Ilya Repin, Russian Academy of Arts. 1915 – 2005. – Saint Petersburg: Pervotsvet Publishing House, 2007.
