= Tamara Nosova =

Russian actress

- Тамара Носова
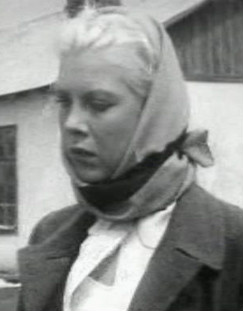
- Nosova in 1948
- Born: 21 November 1927; Moscow, Russian SFSR, Soviet Union
- Died: 25 March 2007 (aged 79); Moscow, Russia
- Resting place: Vagankovo Cemetery
- Education: Gerasimov Institute of Cinematography
- Occupation: Actress
- Years active: 1948-1999
- Awards: People's Artist of Russia

Tamara Makarovna Nosova (Russian: Тамара Макаровна Носова; 21 November 1927 – 25 March 2007) was a Soviet and Russian actress, who was awarded the title of People's Artist of Russia in 1992. She appeared in 27 films between 1948 and 1999. She was married to writer Vitali Gubarev.

== Biography ==
Nosova was born in Moscow, on 21 November 1927. In 1950, she graduated from the Gerasimov Institute of Cinematography in 1950. She was one of the most popular comedians of the 1950s and 1960s. Since the 1970s, she has rarely played in films. She spent her last years in loneliness and seclusion while living in a dirty apartment. On 6 March 2007 she was found unconscious on the floor in her house with rats and cockroaches crawling around her body. Nosova died on 25 March 2007 from a brain ischemia. The urn with her ashes was buried at the Vagankovo Cemetery's columbarium.

== Partial filmography ==
- The Young Guard (1948) as Valentina Filatova
- Stranitsy zhizni (1948) as Klava (uncredited)
- The Fall of Berlin (1950) as Katia
- Dream of a Cossack (1951) as Anfisa
- The Government Inspector (1952) as Maria Antonovna Skvoznik-Dmukhanovskaya
- The Safety Match (1954) as Akulina
- Gost s Kubani (1956) as Duska
- Carnival Night (1956) as Tosya Burigina, Ogurtsov's secretary
- Ona vas lyubit (1957) as Tamara
- Shtorm (1957)
- Konets Chirvy-Kozyrya (1957) as Paranya Piven
- Novye pokhozhdeniya Kota v Sapogakh (1958) as Court Lady Dvulichie
- Osobyy podkhod (1959) as Verochka
- Chernomorochka (1959) as Veronika - pevitsa
- Clear Skies (1961) as Factory Girl
- Kingdom of Crooked Mirrors (1963) as Aunt Aksal
- Balzaminov's Marriage (1965) as Nichkina
- Spyashchiy lev (1965) as Olimpiada Andreyevna
- Wedding in Malinovka (1967) as Komarikha
- Fire, Water, and Brass Pipes (1968) as Drowned woman
- The Brothers Karamazov (1969) as Marya Kondratyevna
- Paytyun kesgisherits heto (1969) as Galina
- Staryy znakomyy (1969) as Tosya Ogurtsova
- V tridevyatom tsarstve (1970) as Margo
- Besstrashnyy ataman (1973) as Uryadnichikha
- Hello, I'm Your Aunt! (1975, TV Movie) as Donna Rosa d'Alvadorez, millionaire
- Tolko kaplyu dushi (1978) as Korneliya
- Tayna chyornykh drozdov (1983) as Mrs. Crump
- Spokoystvie otmenyaetsya (1983)
- Dead Souls (1984, TV Mini-Series) as Korobochka
- Bulvarnyy roman (1994) as Fanni Lvovna Edelheim
