= Yuri Tavrov =

Actor

- Born: Yuri Petrovich Tavrov; 2 July 1938; Zhytomyr Oblast, Ukrainian SSR
- Died: July 4, 2010 (aged 72); Odesa, Ukraine
- Occupation: Actor

Yuri Petrovich Tavrov (Ukrainian: Юрій Петрович Тавров; July 2, 1938, in Luchyn, Ukrainian SSR, USSR – July 4, 2010, in Odessa, Ukraine) was a Ukrainian Soviet actor. His most famous role in cinema was as the blacksmith Vakula in the film "The Night Before Christmas."

== Biography ==
Born on July 2, 1938, in the village of Luchyn, Popelnyansky District, Zhytomyr Oblast. He graduated from an acting studio and appeared in films from 1961 to 1975. Due to family circumstances, he was forced to leave the film industry. After a fourteen-year career in cinema, he worked as a builder and, in recent years, as a painter at the Odessa State Academy of Construction and Architecture.

He spent his entire life in Odessa and was married twice.

He is buried in Odessa, at the 2nd Christian Cemetery in section 17.

== Filmography ==
- 1961 The Night Before Christmas
- 1970 Mezh vysokikh khlebov
- 1974 Proshchayte, faraony!
- 1975 Vesna dvadtsat devyatogo
- 1975 Port
