= Dream of a Cossack =

1951 film

- German film poster
- Directed by: Yuli Raizman
- Written by: Semyon Babaevskiy; Boris Churskov
- Produced by: Mosfilm
- Starring: Sergei Bondarchuk
- Cinematography: Sergey Urusevsky
- Edited by: T. Likhacheva
- Release date: 6 August 1951
- Running time: 118 minutes
- Country: Soviet Union
- Language: Russian

Dream of a Cossack (Russian: Кавалер Золотой Звезды, translit. Kavalier zolotoy zvezdy) is a 1951 Soviet drama film directed by Yuli Raizman and based on the novel The Golden Star Chavalier by Semyon Babayevsky. It was entered into the 1951 Cannes Film Festival.

== Plot ==
Sergei Tutarinov, a veteran of the Great Patriotic War, returns to his native village to take an active part in its restoration. His initiatives are strongly supported by the local Secretary of the Communist Party. Tutarinov becomes chairman of the party and begins to rebuild the whole town after the defeat of the Germans.

== Cast ==
- Sergei Bondarchuk as Semyon Tutarinov
- Anatoli Chemodurov as Semyon Goncharenko
- Kira Kanayeva as Irina Lyubasheva
- Boris Chirkov as Kondratyev
- Pyotr Komissarov as Khokhlakov
- Vladimir Ratomsky as Ragulin
- N. Sevelov as Ostroukhov
- Nikolai Gritsenko as Artamashov
- Ivan Pereverzev as Boichenko
- F. Kiryutin as Nenashev
- Tamara Nosova as Anfisa
- Stepan Kayukov as Rubstov-Yennitsky
- Aleksandr Antonov
- Semyon Svashenko as Secretary
- N. Svetlov as Ostroukhov
