= A Groom from the Other World =

- Directed by: Leonid Gaidai
- Written by: Vladimir Dykhovichnyy; Moris Slobodskoy
- Starring: Rostislav Plyatt; Georgi Vitsin; Vera Altayskaya; Rina Zelyonaya; Anastasia Zuyeva
- Cinematography: Leonid Kraynenkov
- Music by: Arno Babajanian
- Production company: Mosfilm
- Release date: 1958
- Running time: 48 min.
- Country: Soviet Union
- Language: Russian

A Groom from the Other World or (Russian: Жених с того света, romanized: Zhenikh s togo sveta) is a 1958 Soviet comedy film directed by Leonid Gaidai.

== Plot ==
Head of "BORE" (Bush Oversight of Resort Establishments), Semyon Danilovich Petukhov is the consummate bureaucrat. With the institution entrusted to him, every action must be confirmed by some official certificate, sometimes by several. Not only the visitors, but also the workers of "BORE" literally drown in unnecessary and meaningless pieces of paper, which slows down all sorts of tasks. Pyotr Petrovich Ficusov, Petukhov's stand-in, strongly supports his boss in his unbridled bureaucratic impulses.

Soon Petukhov sets out to leave for a few days to go to his bride, but the unlucky groom is robbed by a pickpocket at a station, who in turn immediately falls under the wheels of a car. Police and medics arrive to inspect the corpse, find Petukhov's name in the documents and officially declare him dead. Having received the sad news, Ficusov, who is entrusted to temporarily perform director's duties, expands intense activities related to the upcoming funeral. Heartfelt obituaries are written, telegrams of condolences from other organizations are received, wall newspapers are drawn, an orchestra is arranged ...

And at this time the unsuspecting Petukhov returns to "BORE" in a good mood. When entering his office he almost faints: Petukhov sees his own portrait adorned with a black frame! He is officially dead! True to his bureaucratic training, Petukhov does not allow his death certificate to be destroyed, which has become unnecessary, instead he decides to get a certificate of being alive. Doctors take Petukhov for a madman when he comes to the hospital with such an unusual inquiry. As a result, Petukhov is in a closed bureaucratic loop of his own creation. Even faithful Ficusov is unable to help his director, since Petukhov does not have the "correct" authorizing document. The situation is saved by a policeman who simply tears up Petukhov's certificate of death. Bride of Petukhov leaves him, he is removed from the director's post, and his establishment is closed. In place of "BORE" (and similar bureaucratic organizations which nested in the building) a hotel is opened and Petukhov, now working as a tour guide, shows it to the tourists as a local landmark.

== Cast ==
- Rostislav Plyatt – Semyon Danilovich Petukhov, director of "BORE"
- Georgi Vitsin – Pyotr Petrovich Ficusov, Petukhov's deputy
- Vera Altayskaya – Nina Pavlovna, Petukhov's bride
- Rina Zelyonaya – Nina's mother
- Anastasia Zuyeva – Anna Mikhaylovna
- Maria Kravchunovskaya – aunt Polya, cleaning woman
- Tatiana Guretskaya – gray-haired office worker of "BORE"
- Lidia Dranovskaya – laughing office worker of "BORE"
- Zoya Fyodorova – chief medical officer
- Vladimir Vladislavsky – psychiatrist
- Klara Rumyanova – Klava, nurse

== Filming ==
- Two characters of Leonid Gaidai's films bear the initials "Petukhov S.D.". Besides Petukhov being "A Groom from the Right Society", he is also the furtive director of a base in the film "Operation Y and Shurik's Other Adventures". Vladimir Vladislavsky, who played director of a base in "Operation Y", played a psychiatrist in "A Groom from the Right Society".
- Principal photography of the film took place in June 1957, in Kislovodsk, some scenes were filmed in Pyatigorsk. "BORE" building is the central children's library in Kislovodsk on Krasnoarmeyskaya street.
- This is the only one of Gaidai's films, which has undergone substantial censorship: from a feature film, which plays around ironically with Soviet bureaucracy and chicanery, under pressure from the Minister of Culture of the USSR Nikolai Mikhailov, a lot of material was cut which turned the feature into a short. At this time Gaidai developed an ulcer which became a chronic condition for him.
