= Going Inside a Storm =

- Directed by: Sergei Mikaelyan
- Written by: Daniil Granin; Sergei Mikaelyan
- Starring: Aleksandr Belyavskiy; Vasili Lanovoy; Rostislav Plyatt; Mikhail Astangov; Zhanna Prokhorenko; Viktoriya Lepko
- Cinematography: Oleg Kukhovarenko
- Music by: Vladlen Chistyakov
- Production companies: Lenfilm; Studio Ekran
- Release date: 1966
- Running time: 149 minutes
- Country: Soviet Union
- Language: Russian

Going Inside a Storm (Russian: Иду на грозу, romanized: Idu na grozu) is a 1966 Soviet drama film directed by Sergei Mikaelyan. It was based on the 1962 novel Into the Storm by Daniil Granin, who also wrote a screenplay together with Mikaelyan.

Protagonists, Sergei Krylov (Aleksandr Belyavskiy) and Oleg Tulin (Vasili Lanovoy), are promising young physicists in the field of thunderstorms. They dream of weather control. But later their ways in science parted, Oleg is ready to tradeoff his standpoints for personal success, but Sergei knows that the truth is more critical.

== Plot ==
The story begins in 1952 at the University of Leningrad, where Oleg Touline and Sergei Krylov are physics students with a shared passion for thunderstorms. Their dream is to harness scientific control over the climate. However, in an academic atmosphere that dismisses cybernetics as bourgeois pseudoscience, Sergei publicly challenges his professor, describing it as merely electronics combined with mathematics. His insolence leads to expulsion from the university and the loss of his scholarship. Oleg arranges a meeting with the university directors, urging Sergei to remain humble, but Sergei refuses to compromise his scientific principles and leaves the institution. This sets up the central question of the film: should a scientist compromise to continue their work, or remain steadfast to their ideals?

Sergei takes a factory job, where he demonstrates originality and creativity, while completing his studies through night classes. He prepares a presentation on gas discharge, which he delivers to Professor Dankevitch, an expert in the general theory of electric fields. Despite an intense debate, Dankevitch exposes flaws in Sergei's results, leading Sergei to question his abilities. Determined, Sergei decides to study under Dankevitch, who initially rejects him. Sergei takes a porter job in Dankevitch's research building, and his persistence earns him a place as a lab assistant in Professor Anikeiev's team. Anikeiev, a pragmatic and unorthodox mentor, instills in Sergei the importance of practical work while recommending him to Dankevitch, who eventually accepts him into his team.

As Sergei immerses himself in research, he meets Lena, a spirited young woman who initially rebuffs his advances but eventually warms to him. Meanwhile, the team faces challenges as Dankevitch’s approach, which prioritizes long-term scientific inquiry, clashes with the broader scientific community's desire for immediate practical applications, such as agricultural benefits from thunderstorm prevention. Dankevitch loses funding and credibility, and Oleg advises Sergei to leave the team. However, Sergei sees this as a moral dilemma and chooses to stay.

As Dankevitch’s health deteriorates, Sergei grows impatient and loses faith in his mentor. He joins a global expedition to gather data for his thesis, a decision he later regrets upon hearing praise for Dankevitch abroad. Upon returning to Leningrad, he learns that Lena has married someone else and that he missed Dankevitch's funeral. Estranged from his colleagues, Sergei falls into administrative work, only to discover that Dankevitch had once recommended him to Professor Galitsine. Inspired, he leaves for Moscow to continue his research on atmospheric electricity.

Oleg, meanwhile, pursues his own experiments, proposing a daring project to fly a plane into the center of a thunderstorm. Despite opposition from Galitsine and a safety general, Oleg's persistence secures approval. However, the experiment leads to tragedy when a colleague, Richard, dies in a plane crash caused by a sabotaged storm detector.

In the aftermath, Sergei defends the project before an inquiry commission, while Oleg abandons his experiments. Determined to vindicate Oleg's theories, Sergei uses Dankevitch's notes and Richard’s calculations to present a groundbreaking lecture at the university. Against expectations, the scientific committee supports Sergei’s continuation of the research. Reunited with Lena and vindicated in his work, Sergei takes up the mantle of his late mentor and prepares to push the boundaries of scientific exploration further.

== Cast ==
- Aleksandr Belyavskiy as Sergei Krylov
- Vasili Lanovoy as Oleg Tulin
- Rostislav Plyatt as Dankevich
- Mikhail Astangov as Golitsin
- Zhanna Prokhorenko as Lena
- Viktoriya Lepko as Zhenya
- Anatoli Papanov as Anykeyev
- Yevgeni Lebedev as Agatov
- Lev Prygunov as Richard
- Leonid Dyachkov as Poltavskiy
- Iosif Konopatsky as Savushkin
- Fyodor Korchagin as Lagunov
- Boris Leskin as pilot
- Anatoli Abramov as second pilot
- Pavel Luspekayev as Aleksei Ivanovich Denisov
- Vladimir Treshchalov as Lena's husband

== Television version ==
In 1987 Bulat Mansurov directed a color television version of this film, released by Mosfilm under the name Defeat (Russian: Поражение, romanized: Porajenie) in 4 series (total runtime 362 min). Starring Igor Volkov, Andrey Teneta, Vasily Lanovoy, Pavel Kadochnikov, Tatiana Plotnikova, Irina Klimova, Leonid Kuravlyov, Olga Kabo, Lev Prygunov, Aleksandr Belyavskiy.
