= Anastasia Zuyeva (actress) =

Russian actor (1896-1986)

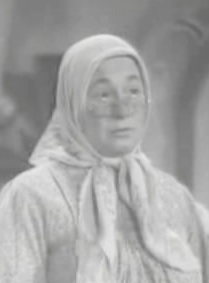
- Anastasia Zuyeva as Agrafena in The Bright Path (1940)
- Born: Anastasia Platonovna Zuyeva; 17 December 1896; Venyovsky Uyezd, Tula Governorate, Russian Empire
- Died: 23 March 1986 (aged 89); Moscow, Soviet Union
- Occupations: Actress, memoirist
- Years active: 1916–1982
- Spouse: Viktor Oransky (1899–1953)
- Awards: People's Artist of the USSR (1957)

Anastasia Platonovna Zuyeva (Russian: Анастаси́я Плато́новна Зу́ева; 17 December 1896 – 23 March 1986) was a Soviet and Russian film and stage actress. She was awarded the title of People's Artist of the USSR (1957). She was the winner of the Stalin Prize of the second degree (1952).

== Selected filmography ==
- 1932 — Prosperity as classy lady
- 1940 — Tanya as Agrafena Lukinichna
- 1940 — Fifth Ocean as Darina Egorovna, Natasha's mother
- 1941 — Battle Movie Collection No.6 as Praskovya
- 1944 — Jubilee as Merchutkina
- 1946 — The First Glove as Privalova
- 1950 — Donetsk Miners as Yevdokia Prohorovna
- 1951 — Sporting Honour as Grinko
- 1952 — The Inspector-General as Poshlyopkina
- 1955 — Vasyok Trubachyov and His Comrades as Aunt Dunya
- 1956 — Case №306 as witness
- 1958 — A Groom from the Other World as Anna Mikhaylovna
- 1960 — Russian Souvenir as Egorkina, wife of Siberian hunter
- 1960 — Dead Souls as Korobochka
- 1960 — Resurrection as Matryona Kharina
- 1964 — Jack Frost as narrator
- 1964 — There Is Such a Lad as Marfa
- 1965 — Loneliness as Aksinia
- 1968 — Fire, Water, and Brass Pipes as narrator
- 1969 — Late Flowers as Prohorovna
- 1970 — Barbara the Fair with the Silken Hair as narrator
- 1971 — Married Elderly Couple as Avdotya Nikitichna
- 1972 — Day by Day as old nurse
- 1973 — The Golden Horns as narrator
- 1977 — Chekhov Pages as old woman
- 1978 — Again Aniskin as Lizaveta Grigorievna Tolstykh
- 1982 — Along Unknown Paths as Glafira Andreyevna, grandmother
