= Tanya (1940 film) =

1940 film by Grigori Aleksandrov

- Directed by: Grigori Aleksandrov
- Written by: Viktor Ardov
- Starring: Lyubov Orlova; Yevgeny Samoylov; Elena Tyapkina
- Cinematography: Boris Petrov
- Edited by: Yeva Ladyzhenskaya
- Music by: Isaak Dunayevsky
- Production company: Mosfilm
- Release date: October 8, 1940
- Running time: 101 min.
- Country: Soviet Union
- Language: Russian

Tanya (Russian: Светлый путь, romanized: Svetly put, English: Bright Path) is a 1940 musical-comedy film directed by Grigori Aleksandrov and based on the play Cinderella by Viktor Ardov.

== Plot ==
Tanya (1940)

The film is set in the spring of 1930. The main character is an illiterate village girl Tanya Morozova who has moved to Moscow. She lives with a mistress who is a former NEPman in the position of a servant. Tanya is astute and has a thirst for knowledge. She is satisfied with her work until she gets dismissed from service by her mistress, who becomes jealous of Tanya to their new neighbor, engineer Alexei Lebedev.

Tanya is invited by her friend Maria Sergeevna Pronina to live with her. She helps Tanya get work as a weaver at a factory where Maria works as a secretary of the party committee. After distinguishing herself in a fight against saboteur Samokhin, Tanya becomes member of the Stakhanovite movement. She quickly achieves outstanding performance in production, managing to supervise 150 machines instead of the standard number of 8 and also receives an education becoming a certified engineer.

At the Kremlin, Tatiana Morozova is awarded with the Order of Lenin for achievements in labor and is elected as a deputy of the Supreme Council. Some time later she meets Alexei Lebedev, who has become director of the factory. With her achievements she manages to gain his love and respect.

== Production ==
Grigori Aleksandrov originally wanted the film to be named the same as the original play "Cinderella" by Viktor Ardov, but Stalin disapproved and Aleksandrov was forced to pick a new one from a list of twelve titles compiled by Stalin.

Weaver Dusya Vinogradova who achieved the record of servicing 216 machines during a shift, was the inspiration for the character of Tanya Morozova. Lybov Orlova took great care to get into character and before filming became a qualified weaver and worked for three months at the Moscow Research Institute of Textile Industry.

A significant part of everyday scenes were filmed at the Trinity Lavra of St. Sergius and the production episodes at the Bogorodsko-Glukhovskaya factory in Noginsk (Novotkatskaya factory building).

== Release ==
After Stalin's death some scenes and frames were censored (for example, Stalin's statue at VDNKh, Molotov's reference in his government telegram).

The full version of the film was shown in the early 1990s, in the program Kinopravda? on Channel One Russia, and in 2002 on the centenary of the birth of Lyubov Orlova, on Russia-1 the complete version of the film was shown, but with "reconstructed" image quality.

In the 1990s and 2000s the film was produced on home video cassettes. Subsequently, it was released on DVD as a condensed and as a complete (publisher - "Vostok V") version of the film.

The official Mosfilm version is 4 minutes shorter than Gosfilmofond version (1 hour 37 minutes).

== Trivia ==
At the very beginning of the film when the radio transmits a sequence of morning exercises, musical themes by Isaak Dunayevsky from another film by Grigori Alexandrov with Lyubov Orlova—Jolly Fellows—are heard.

== Cast ==
- Lyubov Orlova - Tatiana Morozova
- Yevgeny Samoylov - Alexey Lebedev
- Elena Tyapkina - Maria Sergeevna Pronina
- Vladimir Volodin - professor Pyotr Taldykin
- Osip Abdulov - Feodor Karpovich Dorokhov
- Nikolay Konovalov - Nikolai Zubkov
- Anastasia Zuyeva - Agrafena Lukinichna
- Rina Zelyonaya - secretary
- Pavel Olenev - Kurnakov
- Fedor Seleznev - Samokhin
- V.V. Jidkova - mistress
- Vera Altayskaya - Claudia
- Nina Fedosyuk - Maroussia
- Alexandra Terekhina - Varia
