= World Champion (film) =

- Russian: Чемпион мира
- Directed by: Vladimir Gonchukov
- Written by: Valentin Ezhov; Vasiliy Solovyov
- Starring: Aleksey Vanin; Vladimir Volodin; Vasily Merkuryev
- Cinematography: Grigori Garibyan
- Edited by: Raisa Shor
- Music by: Vasily Solovyov-Sedoi
- Production company: Gorky Film Studio
- Release date: 1955
- Running time: 86 min.
- Country: Soviet Union
- Language: Russian

World Champion (Russian: Чемпион мира) is a 1955 Soviet sports drama film directed by Vladimir Gonchukov.

The film tells the story of Ilya Gromov, a well-known strongman among fellow villagers and how under the guidance of an experienced coach, a simple country boy becomes a world champion in the Greco-Roman wrestling.

== Plot ==
Young blacksmith Ilya Gromov, from the White Springs collective farm, earns the title of regional wrestling champion among kolkhoz workers. Impressed by his talent, local authorities decide to transfer him to the city for further development. A determined local Komsomol organizer argues for Gromov to train at the kolkhoz instead. Witnessing the discussion, Fyodor Bessonov, a seasoned coach and world champion of 1932 who trained under Poddubny, decides to dedicate time to training rural athletes. Meanwhile, Gromov arrives in the city, where officials find him a job. Dissatisfied with this arrangement, Bessonov watches as a master wrestler, Eliseev, defeats Gromov in a match. Disheartened, Gromov contemplates quitting, but Bessonov convinces him to persevere.

Bessonov visits White Springs and discovers talented young athletes among the local youth. After extensive training, Gromov wins a republic-wide wrestling competition. Bessonov begins preparing him for the All-Union Championship. In the championship's decisive match, Gromov loses on points to Korablyov, an 11-time USSR champion and Honored Master of Sports. However, Korablyov praises Gromov’s skill and insists he represent the USSR in international competitions. Before leaving, Gromov finally confesses his feelings to his beloved Nastya. Overjoyed and confident, he departs with the team to compete abroad.

In the climactic match against experienced Swedish wrestler Ole Irsen, Gromov triumphs, earning the prestigious title of world champion.

== Cast ==
- Aleksey Vanin as Ilya Gromov, wrestler
- Vladimir Volodin as Privalov
- Vasili Merkuryev as Fyodor Bessonov
- Vladimir Gulyaev
- Denis Andreyev
- Veniamin Beloglazov
- Nadezhda Cherednichenko
- Dmitriy Kara-Dmitriev
- Klavdiya Khabarova
- Nikolai Komissarov
- Muza Krepkogorskaya

== Release ==
Vladimir Gonchukov film's took the 12th place in the ranking of the highest-grossing films of the USSR in 1955. In the history of Soviet hire, he is on the 461st place with 27.9 million spectators.
