= Daniil Granin =

Soviet and Russian author

- Даниил Гранин
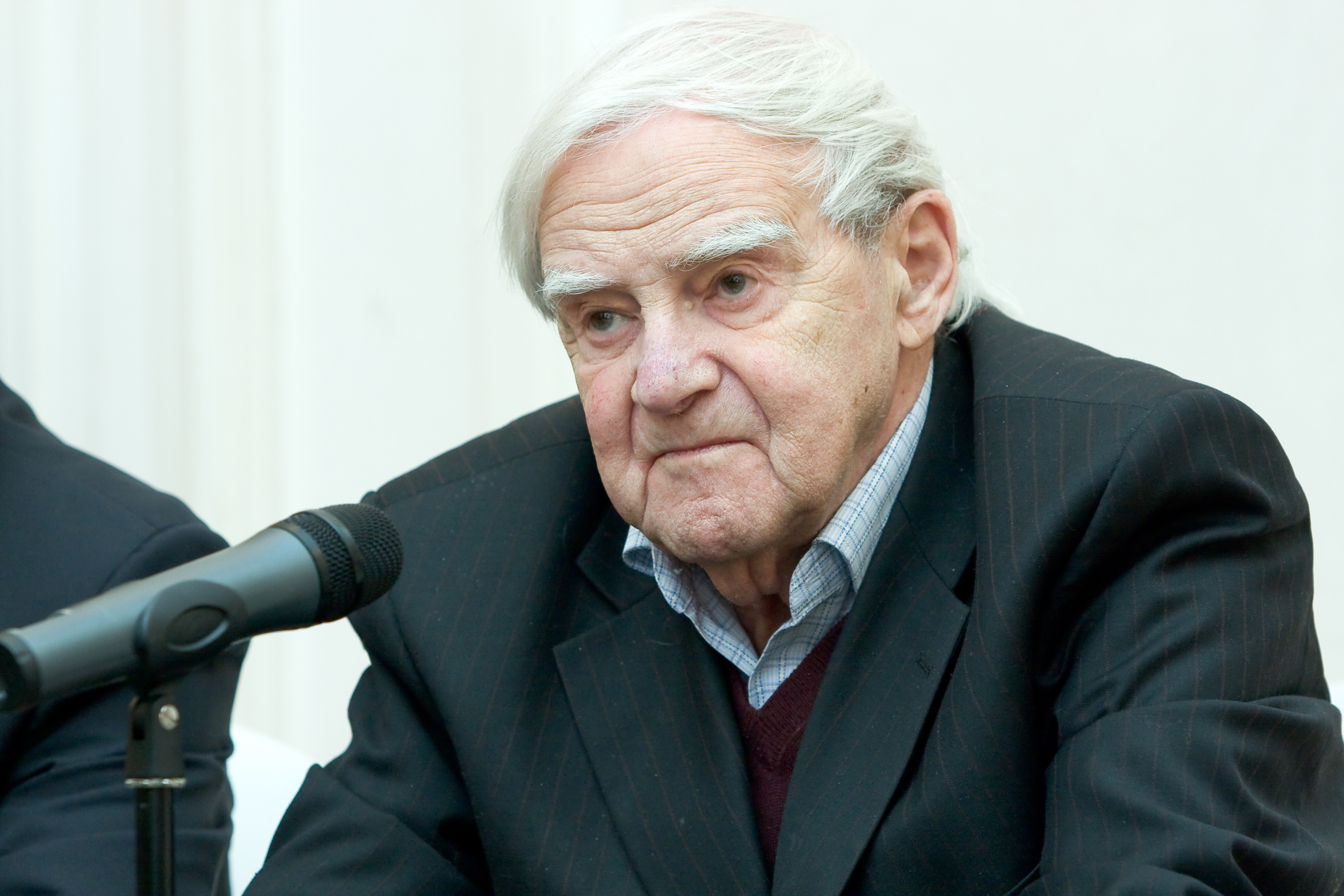
- Granin in 2009
- Born: 1 January 1919; Volyn, Kursk Governorate, Russian SFSR (Note: In his early autobiographies Granin wrote that he was born on 1 January 1918 in the "town of Volyn, Kursk Governorate." The town with such name never existed, most probably he meant the selo of Volynka in what is now Rylsky District.)
- Died: 4 July 2017 (aged 98); Saint Petersburg, Russia
- Education: Leningrad Polytechnical Institute
- Occupations: Engineer, soldier, writer
- Writing career
- Genre: Fiction

Daniil Aleksandrovich Granin (Russian: Даниил Александрович Гранин; 1 January 1919 (Note: Year of birth mistakenly given in some sources as 1918 because of a misprint in a 1964 literary encyclopedia.) – 4 July 2017), original family name Gherman (Russian: Ге́рман), was a Soviet and Russian author.

== Life and career ==
Granin started writing in the 1930s, while he was still an engineering student at the Leningrad Polytechnical Institute. After graduation, Granin began working as a senior engineer at an energy laboratory, and shortly after war broke out, he volunteered to fight as a soldier.

One of the first widely praised works by Granin was a short story about graduate students titled "Variant vtoroi" (The second variant), which was published in the journal Zvezda in 1949. Granin had continued to study engineering and work as a technical writer before he achieved literary success, thanks to his Iskateli (The Seekers, 1955), a novel inspired by his career in engineering. This book was about the overly bureaucratic Soviet system, which tended to stifle new ideas. Granin served as a board member of the Leningrad Union of Writers, and won many medals and honors including the State Prize for Literature in 1978 and Hero of Socialist Labor 1989. He continued writing in the post-Soviet era.

== Writing ==
According to the Great Soviet Encyclopedia: "The main theme of Granin’s works is the romance and poetry of scientific and technological creativity and the struggle between searching, principled, genuine scientists imbued with the communist ideological context and untalented people, careerists, and bureaucrats (the novels Those Who Seek, 1954, and Into the Storm, 1962)".

In 1979, he published Blokadnaya kniga (translated as A Book of the Blockade), which mainly revolves around the lives of two small children, a 16-year-old boy and an academic during the Siege of Leningrad. Written together with Ales Adamovich, the book is based on the interviews, diaries and personal memoirs of those, who survived the siege during 1941–44. It was nominated for the 2004 Lettre Ulysses Award for the Art of Reportage. On September 8, 2021, the film "The Blockade Diary," based on Granin's "A Book of the Blockade," was presented in Moscow cinemas.

One of his most popular books is The Bison (1987), which tells the story of the Soviet geneticist Nikolay Timofeev-Ressovsky. In October 1993, he signed the Letter of Forty-Two.

== Honours and awards ==
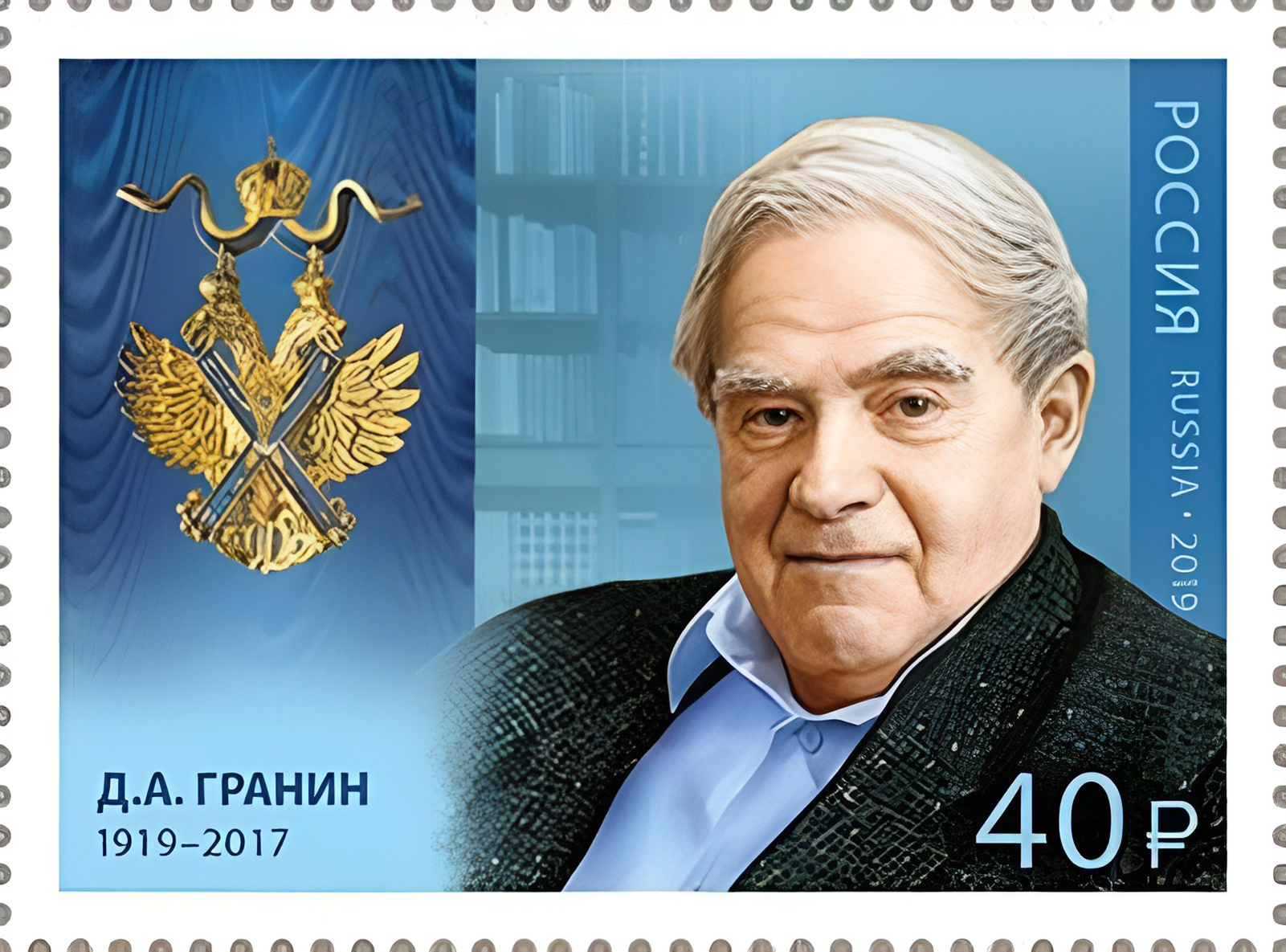
Granin on a 2019 stamp of Russia

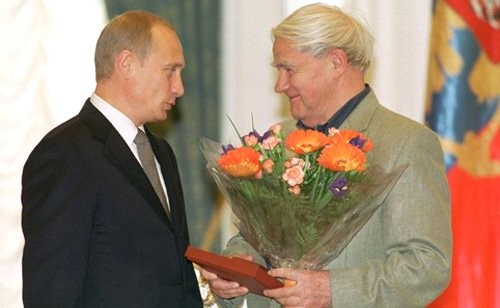
Presentation of the State Prize with President Vladimir Putin, 12 June 2002

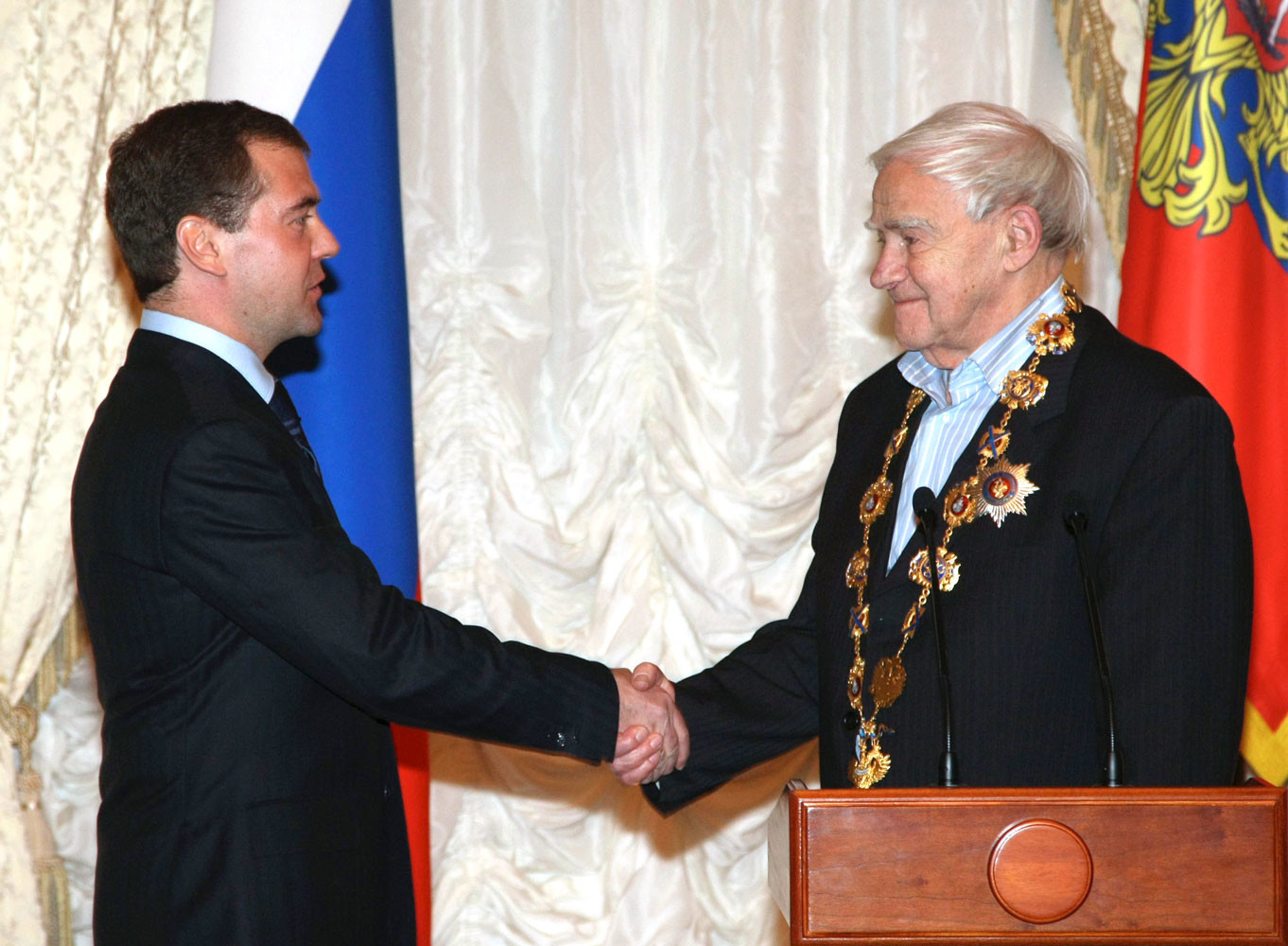
Presentation of the Order of St. Andrew with President Dmitry Medvedev, 26 January 2009

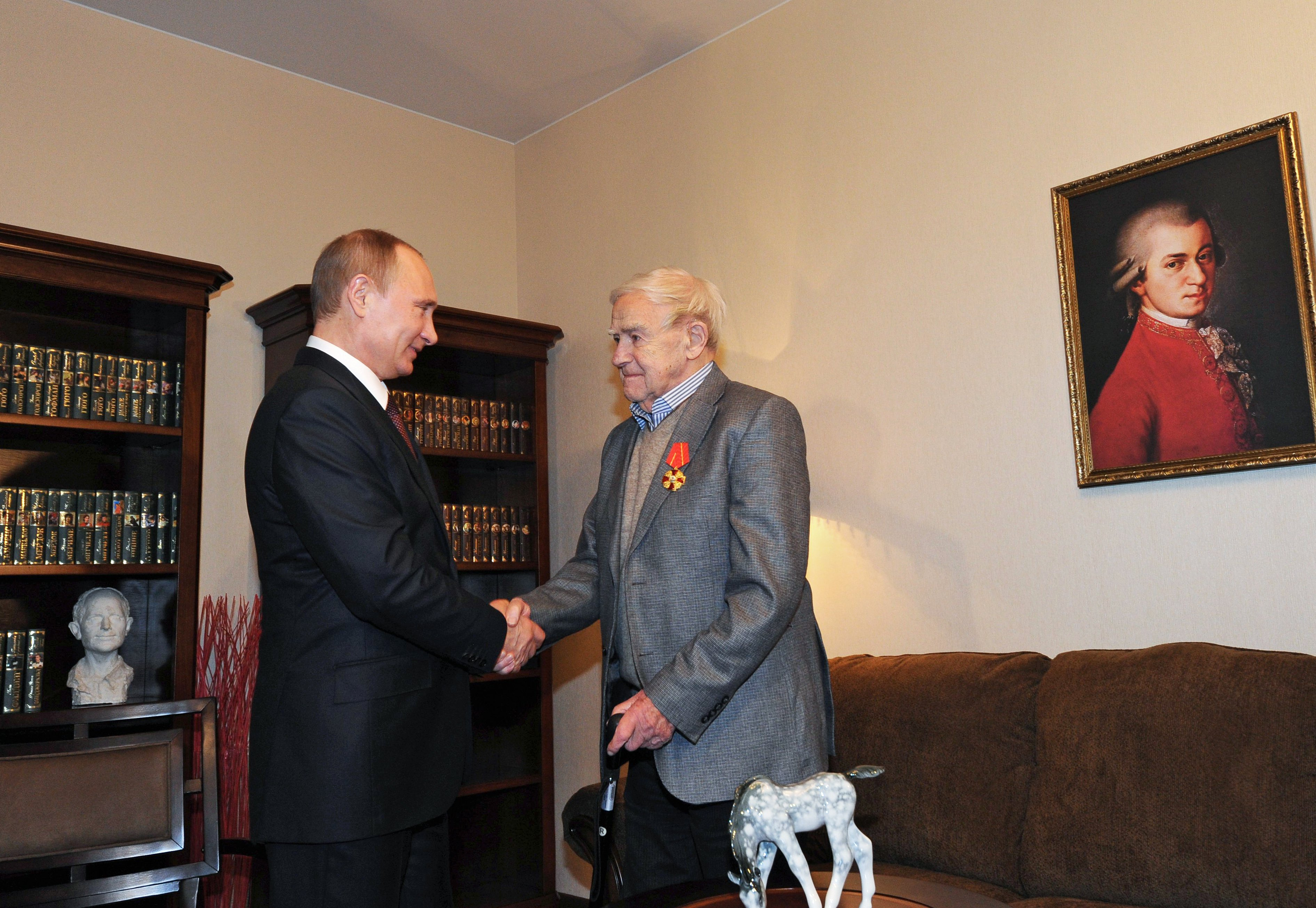
Presentation of the Order of Alexander Nevsky with President Vladimir Putin, 7 January 2014

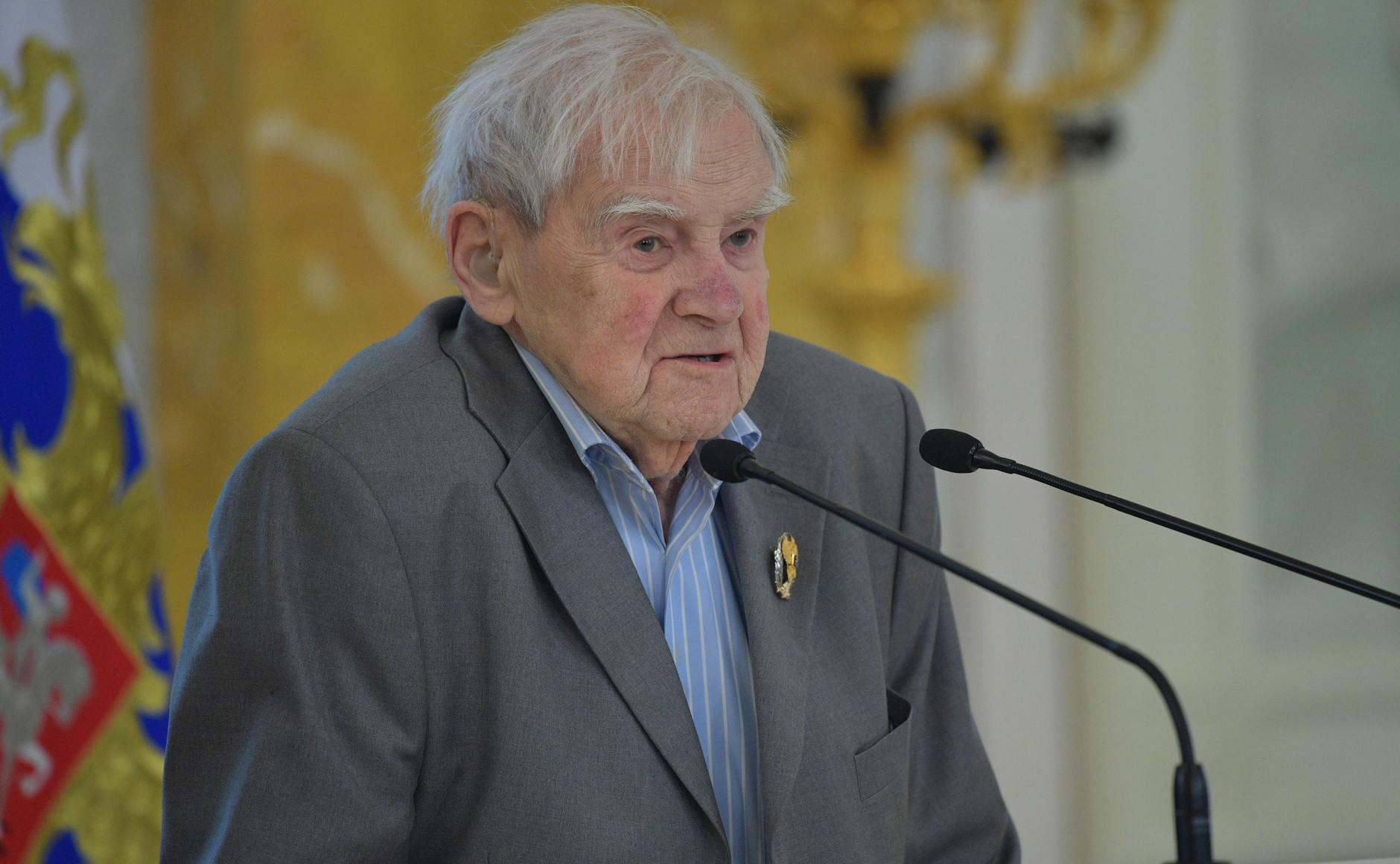
Meeting on ceremony of awarding of 2016 State Prizes, 3 June 2017 (Saint Petersburg)

- Hero of Socialist Labour (1989)
- Order of St. Andrew (28 December 2008) – for outstanding contribution to the development of national literature, many years of creative and social activities
- Order of Lenin
- Order of the Red Banner of Labour
- Order of the Red Star
- Order of Friendship of Peoples
- State Prize of the Russian Federation (3 June 2017)

== Works ==
Below is a list of works by Granin translated into English:

- Those Who Seek (1954)
- Into the Storm (1962, tr. 1965) (adapted as the 1966 Soviet film Going Inside a Storm)
- The House on the Fontanka (1967, tr. 1970)
- A Book of the Blockade (1979, tr. 1983)
- The Bison: A Novel about the Scientist Who Defied Stalin (1987, tr. 1990)
