= The First Glove =

- Russian poster
- Russian: Первая перчатка
- Directed by: Andrey Frolov
- Written by: Aleksandr Filimonov
- Starring: Vladimir Volodin; Anastasia Zuyeva; Ivan Pereverzev
- Cinematography: Fyodor Firsov
- Music by: Vasily Solovyov-Sedoy
- Production company: Mosfilm
- Release date: 1946
- Running time: 77 min.
- Country: Soviet Union

The First Glove (Russian: Первая перчатка, romanized: Pervaya perchatka) is a 1946 Soviet sports comedy film directed by Andrey Frolov about young boxer Nikita Krutikov.

== Plot ==
Boxing coach Ivan Vasilyevich Privalov (Vladimir Volodin) of the "Meteor" society meets his "dream" in the form of retired military man Nikita Krutikov (Ivan Pereverzev) at the strength tester in a park. Impressed by Krutikov's impressive physical attributes, Privalov decides to train him to become a champion. He shares this plan with his friends—stadium attendant Savelich and massage therapist Lubyago—and explains that while he invited Nikita to join, it was another coach, Shishkin of the "Motor" society, who would have guided Nikita by the hand. As he speaks, Nikita arrives at the stadium and, after a chance conversation with Shishkin, ends up joining "Motor" instead of "Meteor." Privalov, Lubyago, and Savelich await the new recruit in vain, and later Shishkin proudly informs them of his new, promising talent.

Soon, Nikita meets a charming gymnast named Nina Grekova (Nadezhda Cherednichenko), who is part of the "Meteor" society. When she asks which society he belongs to, he proudly claims to be a member of the same one as her. Nina doesn't remember him, so Nikita shows his membership card, which reveals the mix-up, prompting him to rush back to "Meteor" and to Privalov. Privalov begins training Nikita, and he wins fight after fight. The story leads toward the climactic showdown with Moscow champion Yuri Rogov, coached by Privalov's rival, Shishkin. However, Nikita's path to the championship title is fraught with challenges. Privalov identifies three "critical moments": Nina, whom Nikita is seriously courting and who would cause him to quit boxing if they married; the director of a Siberian state farm, where Krutikov comes from; and Privalov's wife, who insists that her husband give up coaching and move with her to the countryside for a quieter life.

Just before the decisive fight between Nikita and Rogov, the first "critical moment" occurs: Nikita proposes to Nina, but she, having promised Privalov, refuses, agreeing to marry only after the match. The second "critical moment" follows when the director of the farm arrives in Moscow, and a heartbroken Nikita decides to return home. The director gives him a ticket, and despite Lubyago's attempts to stop him, Nikita boards the train to Vladivostok. Upon hearing this, Privalov faints publicly and is carried home, where the third "critical moment" unfolds—his wife. As Nikita nears his destination, he reconsiders his decision during the journey and switches to a train heading back to Moscow. He arrives just in time for the fight but faces Privalov's objection—"two weeks without training!" Nevertheless, Privalov permits him to fight. Nikita almost knocks out his opponent but ultimately loses the match. It is only after this defeat that Nikita awakens as a true athlete.

== Cast ==
- Vladimir Volodin as Ivan Privalov
- Anastasia Zuyeva as Privalova
- Ivan Pereverzev as Nikita Krutikov
- Nadezhda Cherednichenko as Nina Grekova
- Sergei Blinnikov as Porfiriy Mikhaylovich Koshelev
- Vladimir Gribkov as Shishkin
- Anatoly Stepanov as Yury Rogov
- Tatyana Govorkova as Rogova, his mother
- Afanasy Belov as Afanasy Lubyago, trainer
- Pavel Olenev as Savelich, arena manager
