= Vasily Zakharyashchev =

Russian politician (1946–2023)

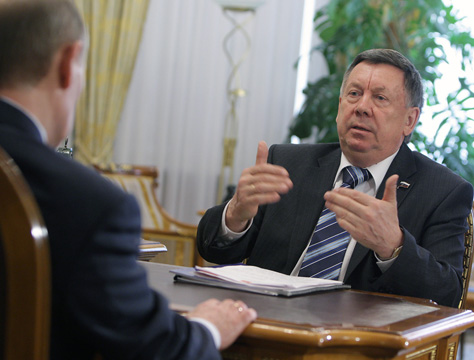

Member of the State Duma
- In office 24 December 2007 – 21 December 2011

Personal details
- Born: Vasily Ivanovich Zakharyashchev; 24 January 1946 Maly Sapozhok, Sapozhkovsky District, Ryazan Oblast, Russian SFSR, USSR
- Died: 28 January 2023 (aged 77)
- Party: United Russia
- Education: Leningrad Forestry Academy

Vasily Ivanovich Zakharyashchev (Russian: Василий Иванович Захарьящев; 24 January 1946 – 28 January 2023) was a Russian politician. A member of United Russia, he served in the State Duma from 2007 to 2011.

Zakharyashchev died on 28 January 2023, at the age of 77.
