= Sporting Honour =

1951 film by Vladimir Petrov

- Directed by: Vladimir Petrov
- Written by: Nikolay Erdman; Mikhail Volpin
- Starring: Aleksei Gribov; Grigori Sergeyev; Margarita Lifanova
- Cinematography: Yuli Kun; Mark Magidson; Vladimir Yakovlev
- Edited by: Klavdiya Moskvina
- Music by: Matvei Blanter
- Production company: Mosfilm
- Release date: 11 June 1951
- Running time: 107 minutes
- Country: Soviet Union
- Language: Russian

Sporting Honour (Russian: Спортивная честь) is a 1951 Soviet sports film directed by Vladimir Petrov and starring Aleksei Gribov, Grigori Sergeyev and Margarita Lifanova. It was awarded the Stalin Prize, although political objections had delayed its release.

== Plot ==
Worker of the Ural plant Vetlugin becomes a member of the Moscow football team 'Turbina'. Known to the whole country captain and center striker Vitaly Grinko is jealous of the newcomer and tries to discredit the simple-minded football player. The whole team takes the newcomer's side, criticizes the behavior of the captain, and in the game with the foreign team wins.

== Cast ==
- Aleksei Gribov as Pyotr Semyonovich Grinko
- Grigori Sergeyev as Vitali Grinko
- Margarita Lifanova as Tonya Grinko
- Lev Frichinsky as Vetlugin
- Nikolay Kryuchkov as Coach of 'Turbina' team
- Vadim Sinyavsky as Radio announcer
- Boris Sitko
- Anastasia Zuyeva as Ekaterina Nikolaevna Grinko
- Vladimir Vladislavskiy
- Lev Fenin
- Mikhail Semichastny
- Mikhail Antonevich
- Boris Kochetov
- Aleksandr Malyavkin
- Vsevolod Radikorskiy
- Nina Grebeshkova Tonya's friend
- Yevgeny Leonov as Waiter
- Tatyana Konyukhova as Tonya's friend
- Valentina Telegina as Vetlugina

== Bibliography ==
- Freedman, John. Silence's roar: the life and drama of Nikolai Erdman. Mosaic Press, 1992.
