= Fire, Water, and Brass Pipes =

Fire, Water, and Trumpets
- Directed by: Aleksandr Rou
- Written by: Nikolai Erdman; Mikhail Volpin
- Starring: Natalya Sedykh; Aleksei Katyshev; Georgy Millyar; Vera Altayskaya; Alexander Khvylya; Mikhail Pugovkin
- Cinematography: Dmitri Surensky
- Music by: Nikolai Budashkin
- Production company: Gorky Film Studio
- Release date: 1968
- Running time: 81 min
- Country: Soviet Union
- Language: Russian

Fire, Water, and Trumpets (Russian: Огонь, вода и… медные трубы, Ogon', voda i... mednye truby) is a 1968 Soviet fantasy film directed by Aleksandr Rou. Its story and characters are derived from Slavic folklore.

== Plot ==
There exists a Russian idiom, "to go through fire, water, and trumpets" (пройти огонь, воду и медные трубы), meaning approximately "to go to hell and back"; in other words, to persevere in the face of extreme adversity.

The story follows Vasya, a young collier who ventures into the forest to burn charcoal. There, he encounters Alyonushka, a beautiful girl tending her goat, Byelochka. The two instantly fall in love, but their happiness is shattered when werewolves, acting as henchmen of the wicked Koshchei the Immortal, kidnap Alyonushka. She is taken to Koshchei’s tower to become his captive. To rescue her, Vasya must embark on a perilous journey that mirrors the titular idiom.

First, Vasya braves "fire" by saving the daughter of Tsar Fedul VI from a blaze but refuses the tsar's offer to marry her. Next, he journeys through "water" in the underwater kingdom of a melancholic sea king who tries to distract Vasya with his daughter’s hand in marriage. Finally, Vasya faces "trumpets," a metaphor for the temptation of fame and glory, as the sea king attempts to dazzle him with a hero's welcome. With the help of Byelochka, Vasya overcomes these challenges and stays true to his mission.

Vasya ultimately learns the location of Koshchei’s tower from Baba Yaga and her daughter. Confronting the villain, Vasya defeats Koshchei, who had transformed Alyonushka into a frog as punishment for her defiance. With Koshchei’s death, Alyonushka is restored to her human form. The couple is joyfully reunited, and they hastily marry, bringing the story to a triumphant conclusion.

== Cast ==
- Natalya Sedykh — Alyonushka
- Aleksei Katyshev — Vasya
- Georgy Millyar — Koshchei, Baba Yaga
- Vera Altayskaya — daughter of Baba Yaga
- Koshchei's werewolves:
  - Lev Potyomkin — Blackbeard
  - Alexander Khvylya — Baldy
  - Anatoly Kubatsky — Cyclops
- Leonid Kharitonov — Fedul VI
- Muza Krepkogorskaya — Sofyushka
- Aleksei Smirnov — Head firefighter
- Pavel Pavlenko — Vodyanoy
- Arkady Tsinman — Adviser
- Zoya Vasilkova — Adviser
- Mikhail Pugovkin — Tsar
- Lidiya Korolyova — Tsarina
- Inga Budkevich — Tsarevna
- Anastasia Zuyeva — Storyteller
