= Semyon Babayevsky =

Soviet writer (1909–2000)

- Born: Semyon Petrovich Babayevsky; June 6, 1909; Kunye, Izyumsky Uyezd, Kharkov Governorate, Russian Empire
- Died: March 28, 2000 (aged 90); Moscow, Russian Federation
- Writing career
- Period: 1935—1980s
- Genre: Fiction (Socialist Realism)
- Subject: Collectivization
- Notable work: The Golden Star Chavalier (1947—1948)
- Notable awards: Stalin Prize of first degree (1949), Stalin Prize of second degree (1950, 1951)

Semyon Petrovich Babayevsky (Russian: Семён Петро́вич Бабае́вский, June 6, 1909, Kunye, Izyumsky Uyezd, Kharkov Governorate, Russian Empire — March 28, 2000, Moscow, Russian Federation) was a Soviet writer, three times Stalin Prize laureate, best known for his novel The Golden Star Chavalier (1947-1948) and the second part of it, Light Above the Land (1949-1950).
