= Rostislav Plyatt =

Russian actor (1908–1989)

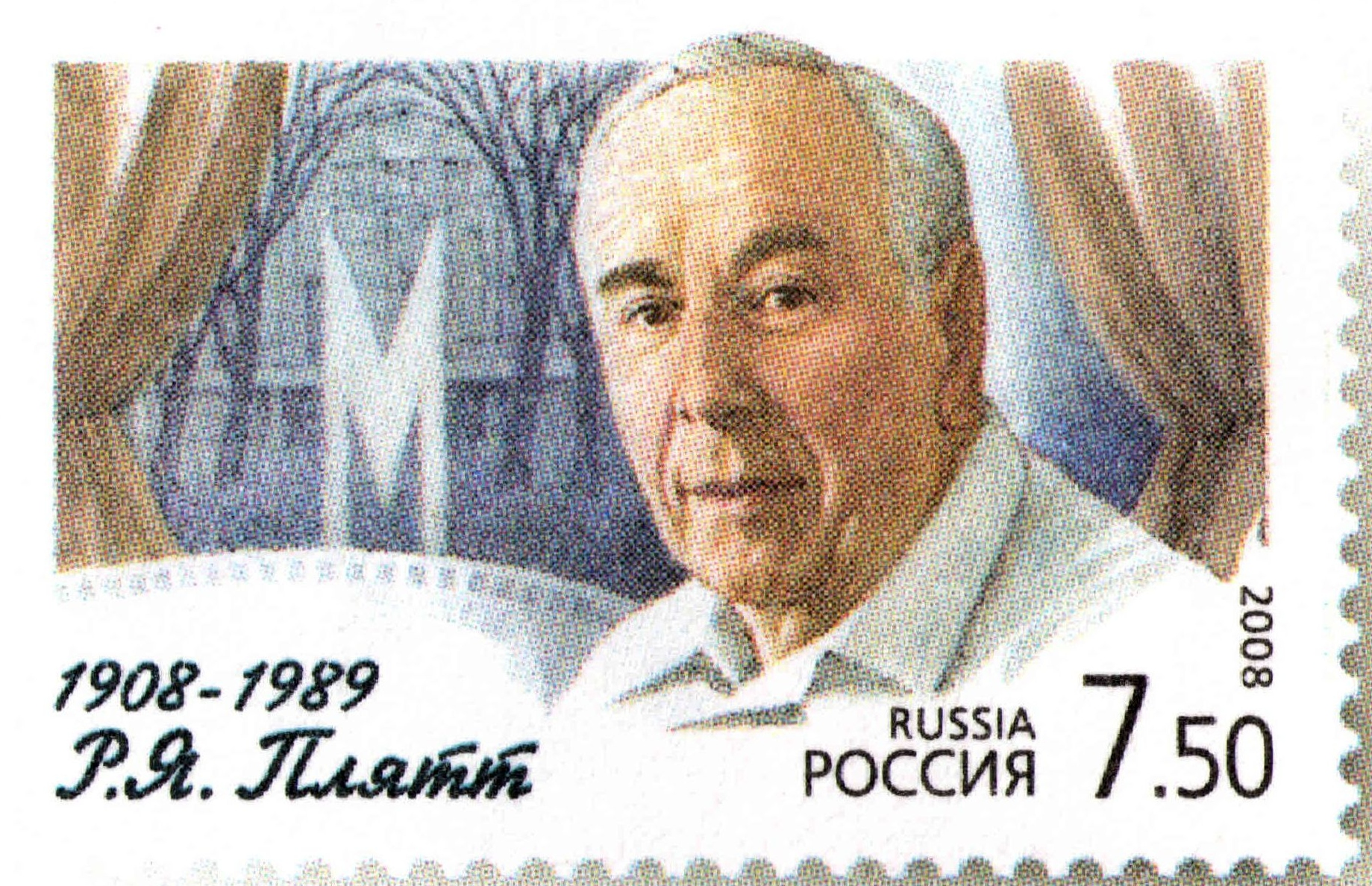
- Plyatt on a 2008 stamp of Russia
- Born: Rostislav Ivanovich Plyat; 13 December 1908; Rostov-on-Don, Don Host Oblast, Russian Empire
- Died: 30 June 1989 (aged 80); Moscow, Russian SFSR, Soviet Union
- Occupation: Actor
- Years active: 1927–1989
- Honours: People's Artist of the USSR (1961); Hero of Socialist Labour (1989)

Rostislav Yanovich Plyatt (Russian: Ростислав Янович Плятт; 13 December [O.S. 30 November] 1908 — 30 June 1989) was a Soviet and Russian stage and film actor. He was named People's Artist of the USSR in 1961 and awarded the USSR State Prize in 1982.

== Biography ==
Born in Rostov-on-Don (modern-day Rostov Oblast of Russia) as Rostislav Ivanovich Plyat, the future actor was so obsessed with theatre that he decided to "correct" his name at the passport office to make it more euphonious and memorable. His father, Ivan Iosifovich Plyat, was a lawyer of Polish descent, "although a very russified one". His Ukrainian mother Zinaida Pavlovna Zakamennaya came from Poltava and died eight years later from tuberculosis. Ivan Plyat then moved to Moscow where he married Anna Nikolaevna Volikovskaya who raised Rostislav as her own son. He was baptized in Russian Orthodoxy and only spoke the Russian language.

Plyatt studied in the Moscow secondary school where he visited drama classes led by a popular Maly Theatre actor Vladimir Lebedev, and then by Moscow Art Theatre actress Varvara Sokolova-Zalesskaya who introduced him to the basics of the Stanislavski's system. After that he decided to become a professional actor and in 1926 unsuccessfully tried to join the Moscow Art Theatre troupe.

He then entered the Theatre-Studio led by Yuri Zavadsky where he spent the next 11 years, performing in mostly comedy roles, although with years he established himself as a serious drama actor. Among his lifetime roles was George Bernard Shaw, whom he portrayed in 1933 in The Devil's Disciple and then reprised in 1963 in both Caesar and Cleopatra (where he also played Caesar) and Jerome Kilty's Dear Liar: A Comedy of Letters.

From 1938 to 1943 Plyatt served at the Lenkom Theatre. Since 1939 he also started appearing in movies. His very first role of a goofy bachelor from the family comedy The Foundling gained him fame and became one of his most memorable performances.

During the Great Patriotic War, Plyatt stayed in the sieged Moscow, gave theatre performances and worked as a radio host, regularly crossing the city during heavy bombings. In 1943 he moved to the Mossovet Theatre where he had served for the rest of his life. He was known for his long-lasting friendship with Faina Ranevskaya, and they regularly performed together in both plays and movies. They appeared in two leading roles in the popular The Rest Is Silence play, the Mossovet stage adaptation of Make Way for Tomorrow where Ranevskaya performed till the end of her career; Plyatt's Barkley Cooper is universally praised as the peak of his acting skills.

Among Plyatt's famous movie roles were Bubentsov in Grigori Aleksandrov's Springtime (1947), Petukhov in A Groom from the Other World (1958) and landlord in Strictly Business (1962), both by Leonid Gaidai, Dankevich in Sergey Mikaelyan's Going Inside a Storm (1965) and pastor Schlag in Tatyana Lioznova's Seventeen Moments of Spring miniseries (1973).

He also worked a lot as a voice actor, narrating films and cartoons, dubbing foreign movies and performing in radio plays. Among those was the popular post-war children's radio play The Club of Famous Captains where he performed for 40 years straight.

Rostislav Plyatt died on 30 June 1989 and was buried at the Novodevichy Cemetery in Moscow.

Plyatt was married twice. His first wife Nina Vladimirovna Butova also performed at the Mossovet Theatre. After her death in 1978, he married Ludmila Semyonovna Maratova, an educator at GITIS and announcer at the All Union First Programme. Plyatt left no children.

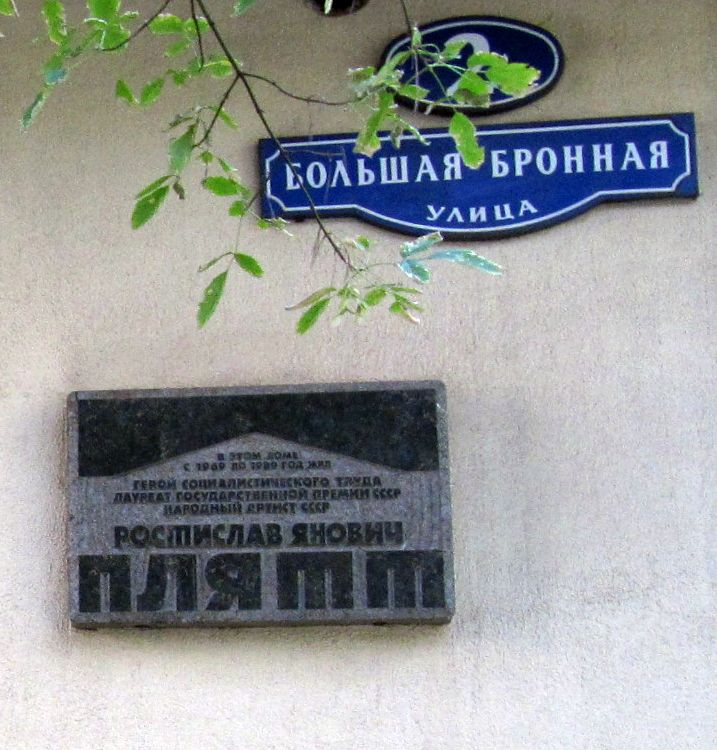
Commemorative Plaque at the house in which Rostislav Plyatt lived. Moscow, B. Bronnaya, 2

== Selected filmography ==
- Lenin in 1918 (Ленин в 1918 году, 1939) as military expert
- The Foundling (Подкидыш, 1939) as bachelor
- Dream (Мечта, 1943) as cabdriver Yanek
- Zoya (Зоя, 1944) as German Soldier
- Springtime (Весна, 1947) as Vasily Bubentsov
- The Battle of Stalingrad (Сталинградская битва, 1947) as general Hermann Hoth
- Brave People (Смелые люди, 1950) as von Schwalbe
- Silvery Dust (Серебристая пыль, 1953) as McKennedy
- A Groom from the Other World (Жених с того света, 1958) as Semyon Petukhov
- Strictly Business (Деловые люди, 1962) as landlord
- Going Inside a Storm (Иду на грозу, 1966) as Dankevich
- The Secret Agent's Blunder (Ошибка резидента, 1968) as Kazin
- Secret Agent's Destiny (Судьба резидента, 1970) as Kazin
- All The King's Men (Вся королевская рать, 1971) as Judge Irwin
- The Twelve Chairs (12 стульев, 1971) as Narrator
- Seventeen Moments of Spring (Семнадцать мгновений весны, 1973) as Pastor Fritz Schlag
- The Breakdown (Авария, 1974) as Kurt Zorn, prosecutor
- Alice in Wonderland (Алиса в Стране чудес, 1981) as Narrator
- Visit to Minotaur (Визит к Минотавру, 1987) as Nicola Amati
