= Red Necktie =

- Russian: Красный галстук
- Directed by: Mariya Sauts; Vladimir Sukhobokov
- Written by: Sergey Mikhalkov
- Starring: Aleksandr Khvylya; Galina Stepanova; Vera Okuneva; Vitali Doronin; Nikolay Bogatyryov
- Cinematography: Leonid Dultsev; Bentsion Monastyrsky
- Edited by: A. Soboleva
- Music by: Anatoli Lepin
- Release date: 1948
- Country: Soviet Union

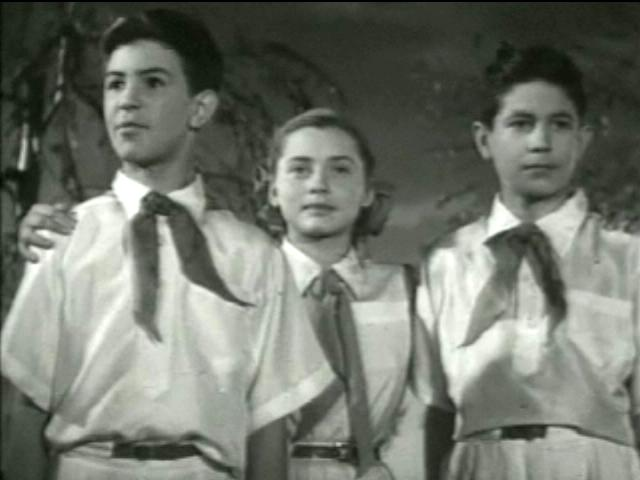
Aleksandr Sokolov (left) as Valery Vishniakov, Irina Nachinkina (center) as Marina Vishniakova and Slava Kotov (right) as Shura Badeikin in Red Necktie (1948)

Red Necktie (Russian: Красный галстук) is a 1948 Soviet children's film directed by Mariya Sauts and Vladimir Sukhobokov.

The film shows how a once-close group of young friends confronts betrayal, forgiveness, and personal growth as they navigate the challenges of loyalty, principles, and family bonds during their formative years.

== Plot ==
The factory director Vishnyakov is raising 13-year-old twins Marina and Valery along with their peer, Shura Badeykin, whose father died at the front and whose mother died from illness. The children are close friends, excel at school, and are respected members of their Pioneer group. However, Valery increasingly displays selfishness and arrogance in his interactions with family and peers.

One day, Vishnyakov notices that Valery has stopped wearing his Pioneer tie and badge. He learns that Valery was expelled from the Pioneers at his previous school for refusing to complete a group assignment—creating a wall newspaper—and removing his tie in protest. When his father, a devoted Communist and responsible figure, reprimands him and calls those who abandon their principles in the face of challenges cowards, Valery writes a request to be reinstated as a Pioneer.

During the Pioneer council meeting, Shura honestly expresses his thoughts about Valery’s behavior and motivations. As a result, Valery's application is rejected, leading him to insult Shura, calling him a traitor who repaid the Vishnyakov family’s kindness with betrayal. Deeply hurt, the principled Shura moves in with his teacher Kochubey, a former neighbor of his parents and a demobilized soldier. Meanwhile, Valery, unwilling to admit his fault, faces a boycott from his classmates.

In the end, with the help of Kochubey, Marina, and their school friends, the children’s friendship is restored. Shura, now adopted by the Vishnyakov family, becomes the twins' foster brother, and Valery, having vowed to accept the truth without resentment, proudly dons his red Pioneer tie once more.

== Cast ==
- Aleksandr Khvylya as Vishnyakov (as A.Khvylya)
- Galina Stepanova as Nadezhda Ivanovna (as G. Stepanova)
- Vera Okuneva as Grandmother (as V. Okuneva)
- Vitali Doronin as Kochubei (as V. Doronin)
- Nikolay Bogatyryov as Young Pioneer organizer (as N. Bogatyryov)
- Aleksandr Sokolov as Valeri Vishnyakov (as Shura Sokolov)
- Irina Nachinkina as Marina Vishnyakova (as Ira Nachinkina)
- Vyacheslav Kotov as Shura Badeikin (as Slava Kotov)
- Anatoli Gonichev as Chashkin (as Tolya Ganichev)
