= Vladimir Volodin =

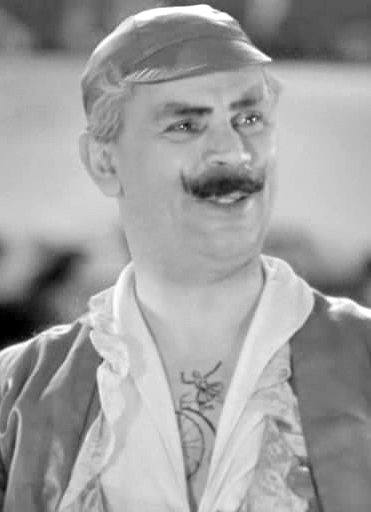
- Born: Vladimir Sergeyevich Volodin; 20 July 1896; Moscow, Russian Empire
- Died: 27 March 1958 (aged 61); Moscow, Soviet Union
- Occupations: Actor, singer
- Years active: 1906–1958

Vladimir Sergeyevich Volodin (Russian: Влади́мир Серге́евич Воло́дин; 1896 – 1958) was a Soviet and Russian stage and film actor. People's Artist of the RSFSR (1947).

He died on 27 March 1958 in Moscow, and was buried at the Novodevichy Cemetery.

== Selected filmography ==
- 1936 – Circus as Ludvig Osipovich, Soviet circus director
- 1938 – Volga-Volga as old pilot
- 1940 – Tanya as professor Pyotr Ustinovich Taldykin
- 1946 – The First Glove as Ivan Vasilyevich Privalov
- 1949 – Cossacks of the Kuban as Anton Petrovich Mudretsov
- 1954 – World Champion as Privalov
- 1956 – A Crazy Day as Filipp Maksimovich, door-keeper
