= Vishnyakov =

Vishnyakov (Russian: Вишняков) and Vishnyakova (Russian: Вишнякова; feminine) is a common Russian surname meaning cherry.

An alternate romanization is Wichniakov.

People with this surname include:

- Albert Vishnyakov (b. 1983), a Russian ice hockey player
- Aleksey Semyonovich Vishnyakov (1859–1919), a Russian industrialist, founder of the Plekhanov University
- Alyaksandr Vishnyakow (b. 1986), a Belarusian footballer
- Georgy Vishnyakov (1871–unknown), Russian sports shooter, competitor in the 1912 Summer Olympics
- Ivan Vishnyakov (1699–1761), a Russian painter
- Konstantin Vishnyakov (b. 1982), a Russian sprint canoer
- Sergey Vishnyakov (1918-1958), Soviet Air Force officer
- Yuri Wichniakov, a Russian oktavist singer

== See also ==
- Vishniac (disambiguation)
