= Anatoly Kubatsky =

Soviet and Russian actor (1908–2001)

- Anatoly Kubatsky in Murder on Dante Street (1961)
- Born: Anatoly Lvovich Kubatsky; 1 November 1908; Moscow, Russian Empire
- Died: 29 December 2001 (aged 93); Moscow, Rússia
- Occupation: Actor
- Years active: 1931–1991

Anatoly Lvovich Kubatsky (Russian: Анато́лий Льво́вич Куба́цкий; 1 November 1908 – 29 December 2001) was a Soviet stage and film actor.

== Life ==
Kubatsky was born in Moscow to parents of Polish ancestry. After studying under Yuri Zavadsky, he found acting work in various theaters throughout Moscow. From 1931 to 1942 he was an actor for Union Radio; from 1942 to 1957 he worked at the Mayakovsky Theatre; from 1957 to 1959 he worked at the Film Actors' Theater; from 1959 to 1973 he worked at the Gorky Theater.

Kubatsky was a prolific character actor, known especially for his roles as eccentric stock characters in fantasy films: robbers, kings, sorcerers, etc. His most prominent role was that of King Yagupop the 77th in Kingdom of Crooked Mirrors. He appeared in several other films by Aleksandr Rou: as the bandit chief in Jack Frost, as one of the werewolves in Fire, Water, and Brass Pipes, and as the clerk in Barbara the Fair with the Silken Hair. His final role was in Sin (1991).

He was married to Raisa Yefimovna Elpert-Halperin, a native of Odessa. Together they had one son, born in 1936. Kubatsky died in Moscow in 2001 and was buried in Pyatnitskoye Cemetery.
