= Vitali Gubarev =

Soviet writer (1912–1981)

- Born: Vitali Georgievich Gubarev; 30 August 1912; Rostov-on-Don, Don Host Oblast, Russian Empire
- Died: 1981; Moscow, Soviet Union
- Occupations: novelist, playwright, journalist
- Spouse(s): Yulia Levteri; Tamara Nosova; Angelina Knyazeva
- Writing career
- Genres: Children's fiction, fantasy, socialist realism

Vitali Georgievich Gubarev (Russian: Виталий Георгиевич Губарев; 30 August [O.S. 17 August] 1912 – 1981) was a Soviet Russian writer of children's literature.

== Biography ==
Gubarev was born in Rostov-on-Don (modern-day Rostov Oblast of Russia). According to the official Soviet biography, his parents were teachers. In reality his father, Georgy Vitalievich Gubarev, came from an ancient family of Don Cossacks of Russian nobility; during the Russian Civil War he fought Bolsheviks as part of the 6th Don Cossack Regiment and the 2nd Combined Cossack Division, then left for Poland in 1920, and by 1951 he arrived to the United States. He published articles, monographs and books dedicated to the history of the Cossacks, including a Cossack Encyclopedia in three volumes where he mentions Vitaly and his brother Igor.

Vitaly's mother Antonina Pavlovna Gubareva came from a priest's family. She raised the children by herself. Vitaly spent his childhood at the Kushchyovskaya stanitsa where he finished the secondary school. He was studying alongside his future wife Yulia Levteri (they got married in 1936 and gave birth to Gubarev's only daughter Valeria who served as a prototype for the main character in his Kingdom of Crooked Mirrors novel). At the age of 14 he published his first short story "Rotten Tree" in a local children's magazine.

In 1931 he started to work as a journalist in Komsomolskaya Pravda and Pionerskaya Pravda where he also served as the main editor at one point. He was among the first to cover the murder of Pavlik Morozov in the articles Kulak's Reprisal and One of Eleven which were later reworked into the novel Pavlik Morozov and a play of the same name.

In 1951 he wrote his first fantasy novel Kingdom of Crooked Mirrors which was also reworked into a play a year later. It gained enormous success and has been regularly reprinted up to this day. In 1963 Aleksandr Rou adapted it into a movie Kingdom of Crooked Mirrors with Gubarev serving as a screenwriter. His second wife, an actress Tamara Nosova, played one of the supporting roles. It was named "Best children's film of 1963" at the all-Union poll conducted by the Soviet Screen magazine, while the title "Kingdom of crooked mirrors" itself turned into an idiom.

During later years Gubarev published a number of other popular fantasy books such as a comedy The Three on Island (1959) adapted as a 1986 cartoon, a children's science fiction novel Adventure to the Morning Star (1961) and a fairy tale In the Far Far Away Kingdom (1970) adapted as a movie of the same name (director Evgeny Sherstobitov).

Gubarev has been awarded the Order of the Badge of Honour twice.

He died in 1981 from a heart attack aged 69. The exact date of his death is unknown. Gubarev was buried at the Vagankovo Cemetery in Moscow.

== Literature works ==
- В Тридевятом царстве (fairy tale novel)
- Королевство кривых зеркал (Kingdom of Crooked Mirrors; fairy tale novel)
- Преданье старины глубокой (fairy tale novel)
- Путешествие на утреннюю звезду (children's science fiction novel)
- Трое на острове (fairy tale novel)
