= Lidiya Vertinskaya =

Russian actress

- Лидия Вертинская
- Vertinskaya as Anidag (1964)
- Born: April 14, 1923; Harbin, Heilongjiang, China
- Died: December 31, 2013 (aged 90); Moscow, Russia
- Education: Moscow School of Painting, Sculpture and Architecture
- Occupations: Actress, artist
- Spouse: Alexander Vertinsky (m. 1942; died 1957)
- Children: 2 (Marianna and Anastasiya)

Lidiya Vladimirovna Vertinskaya (Russian: Лидия Владимировна Вертинская), born Tsirgvava (Georgian: წირღვავა; Russian: Циргва́ва) (14 April 1923 – 31 December 2013), was a Russian-Georgian actress and artist.

Vertinskaya was born in Harbin to an emigre family of mixed Georgian and Russian origin. Her paternal grandparents had moved to China from Georgia with their children, but retained Russian citizenship. Her father, Vladimir Konstantinovich Tsirgvava, was a Soviet official who served on the Chinese Eastern Railway; he died when Vertinskaya was nine years old. Her mother, Lydia Pavlovna Tsirgvava, (née Fomina), originally from a Siberian family of Old Believers, was a housewife.

In 1940, Vertinskaya met the Russian singer Aleksandr Vertinsky in Shanghai. Although he was 34 years older than she, the two were married two years later. In 1943, they emigrated to the Soviet Union. She gave birth to Marianna Vertinskaya (born 1943) and Anastasiya Vertinskaya (born 1944); both daughters became successful Russian actresses.

In 1955, Lidiya Vladimirovna Vertinskaya was graduated from the V. I. Surikov Art Institute and started working as an artist. Beginning in 1952, she also appeared in a number of movies, mostly adaptations of fairy tales. In 1957 Aleksandr Vertinsky died, and she never married again. In 2004 she published a book of memoirs, The Blue Bird of Love.

Lidiya Vertinskaya died on 31 December 2013 and was buried near her husband's grave in the Novodevichy Cemetery in Moscow.

== Filmography ==
- Sadko (1953) as The Phoenix
- Don Quixote (1957) as The Duchess
- New Adventures of Puss-in-Boots (1958) as young witch
- Kyivlyanka (1958) as Frau Marta
- Kingdom of Crooked Mirrors (1964) as Anidag
