= Alexander Khvylya =

Soviet actor

Alexander Khvylya PARSFSR
- Александр Хвыля
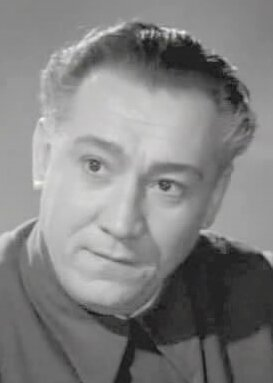
- Died: 14 October 1976
- Occupation: Actor

Alexander Leopoldovich Khvylya (born Bressem, Russian: Александр Леопольдович Хвыля, Ukrainian: Олександр Леопольдович Хвиля, romanized: Oleksandr Leopoldovych Khvylya; 15 July 1905 – 17 October 1976) was a Ukrainian Soviet theater and film actor who played in The Diamond Arm, The End of Chyrva Kozyr, Bohdan Khmelnytsky, and others. He was a People's Artist of the RSFSR (23 October 1963).

Khvylya was born in the Swedish colony in the village of Oleksandro-Shultyne (Yekaterinoslav Governorate, Russian Empire) to Swedish parents as Alexander Leopoldovich Bressem. Today the village is part of the Ivanopil rural community in Kostiantynivka Raion, Donetsk Oblast.

== Career ==
In 1922, he graduated from the Vorovsky Drama Studio. Khvylya worked in the Zankovetska Music-Drama Theater from 1924 through 1926, then in Berezil that just relocated to Kharkiv from Kyiv. From 1934 until the German invasion of World War II, he worked in the Kharkiv Drama Theater of Shevchenko. Later, Khvylia relocated to Moscow, where he worked in the State theater of a cinema-actor.

== Plays ==
- Dictatorship (Ivan Mykytenko) as Husak
- Perish of squadron (Oleksandr Korniychuk) as Baltiyets
- The Storm (Alexander Ostrovsky) as Kudryash

== Selected movies ==
- 1932 Ivan (Alexander Dovzhenko) as Orator (first role in movies)
- 1938 Karmeliuk (Georgiy Tasin) as Karmeliuk
- 1941 Bohdan Khmelnytsky (Ihor Savchenko) as Kobzar
- 1942 Oleksandr Parkhomenko (Leonid Lukov) as Parkhomenko
- 1946 The Liberated Earth as Kostenko
- 1946 The Vow as Semyon Budyonny
- 1948 Red Necktie as Vishnyakov
- 1948 The Young Guard (Sergei Gerasimov) as Shulga (his scenes later were cut out)
- 1949 Konstantin Zaslonov as Secretary of Raion Committee (Stalin Prize, 1950)
- 1949 Fairy Tales of Kuban (Ivan Pyryev) as Denis Koren
- 1951 Taras Shevchenko (Ihor Savchenko) as Mr. Barabash
- 1952 May Nights as the Head
- 1958 Over Tissa as Gromada, general of the border guards
- 1961 Evenings at a khutir near Dykanka (Aleksandr Rou) as Chub
- 1962 Queen of the Gas Station as Priest, the bus passenger
- 1964 Jack Frost (Aleksandr Rou) as Jack Frost
- 1968 The Diamond Arm (Leonid Gaidai) as Boris Savelyevich

== See also ==
- Gammalsvenskby
