= Alexander Rou =

Soviet film director (1906–1973)

- Александр Роу
- Born: 8 March 1906; Sergiyev Posad, Moscow Governorate, Russian Empire
- Died: 28 December 1973 (aged 67); Moscow, Russian SFSR, Soviet Union
- Occupations: Film director; screenwriter
- Years active: 1934–1973

Alexander Arturovich Rou (Russian: Александр Артурович Роу; 8 March [O.S. 23 February] 1906 – 28 December 1973) was a Soviet film director. He directed a number of children's fantasy films, based mostly on Russian folklore that were highly popular and often imitated in the Soviet Union. His films received acclaim for their extensive use of inventive special effects. Rou received the title People's Artist of the RSFSR in 1968.

== Biography ==
He was born to an Irish father Arthur Howard Rowe, (an engineer, who in 1905 came under contract to Russia to establish flour-milling) hence his unusual (for Russia) family name, and a Greek mother, known as Julia Karageorgia. His father worked in Yuryevets and in 1914 returned to Ireland, leaving the family in unstable Russia.

Starting in 1930, Alexander worked at Mezhrabpomfilm as an assistant director to Yakov Protazanov on the films St. Jorgen's Day (1930), Marionettes (1934), About Oddities of Love (1935) and Without a Dowry (1937), as well as with other directors. From 1937, he worked at the "Soyuzdetfilm" studio, later known as the Gorky Film Studio. He directed 15 fantasy films as well as a comedy and three short documentaries. Most of them were based on the Russian folklore or Russian fantasy books, such as by Nikolai Gogol, Petr Yershov, and Vitali Gubarev. They were a part of folk revival trend in the Soviet cinema, alongside films by Aleksandr Ptushko, Ivan Ivanov-Vano, Lev Atamanov, and others. Rou's movies were immensely popular in the Soviet Union and set up a tradition of fantasy films that was followed by younger directors including Dmitry Dyachenko.

Rou died in 1973 in a Moscow hospital while working on pre-production of his final movie Finist, the brave Falcon. It was completed by Gennady Vasilyev after his death.

== Selected filmography ==
- 1938 — Wish upon a Pike
- 1939 — Vasilisa the Beautiful
- 1941 — The Humpbacked Horse
- 1944 — Kashchey the Immortal
- 1952 — May Nights
- 1954 — The Secret of Mountain Lake
- 1958 — New Adventures of Puss in Boots
- 1960 — The Magic Weaver
- 1960 — Cinderella
- 1961 — The Night Before Christmas
- 1963 — Kingdom of Crooked Mirrors
- 1964 — Jack Frost
- 1968 — Fire, Water, and Brass Pipes
- 1969 — Barbara the Fair with the Silken Hair
- 1973 — The Golden Horns (Baba Yaga)

== See also ==
- Aleksandr Ptushko
- Ivan Ivanov-Vano
- Lev Atamanov
