= Apostolopulo House =

19th-century mansion in Taganrog, Russia

- Дом Апостолопуло (Russian)
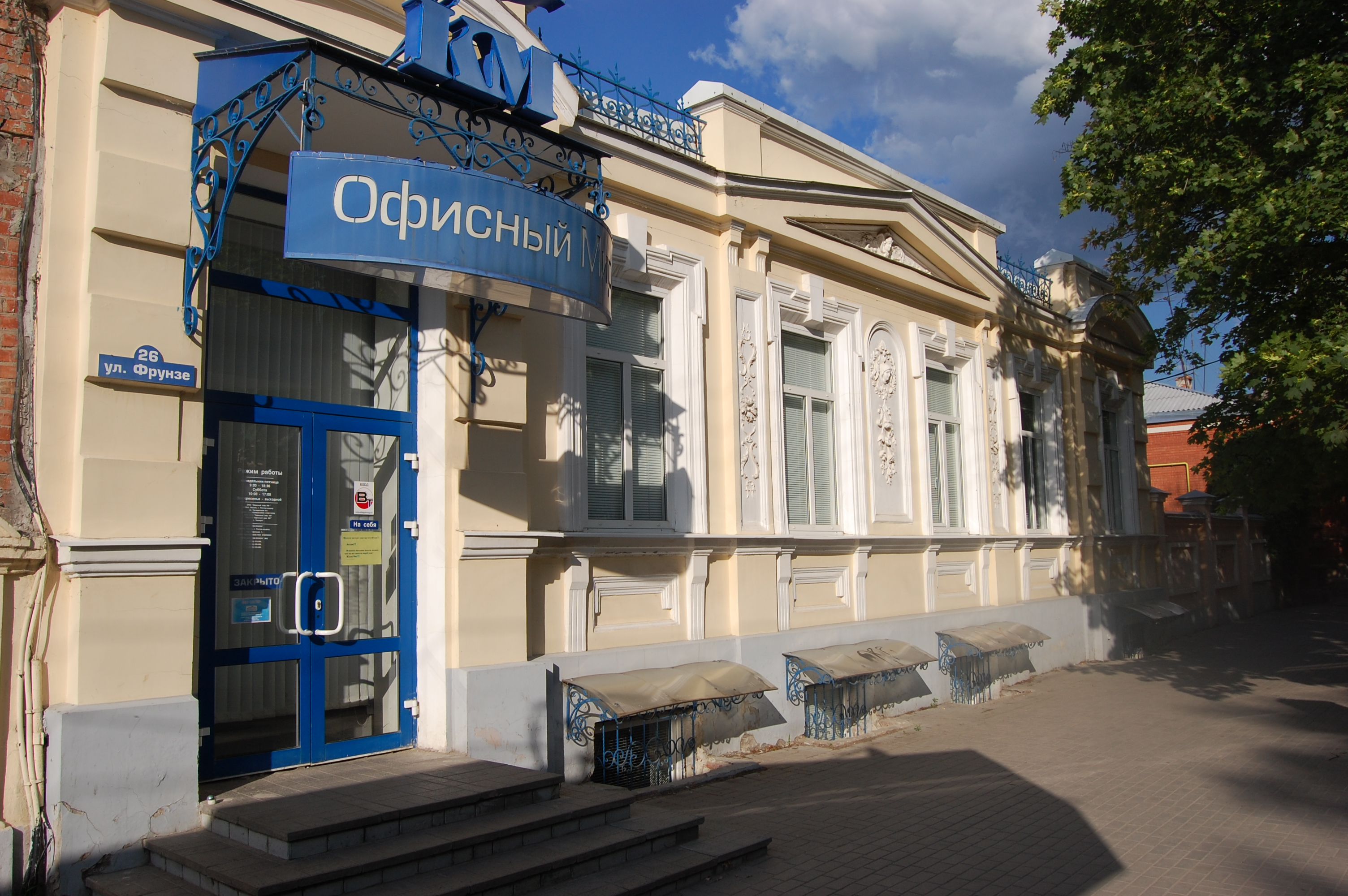

- Location within Russia
- 47°12′44″N 38°55′52″E
- Type: Mansion
- Location: str. Frunze, 26, Taganrog, Rostov oblast Russia

History
- Built: 1870s

Site notes
- Architectural style: mix of motifs of different architectural styles
- Owner: Ivan Apostolopulo

Apostolopulo House (Alafuzov House) (Russian: Дом Апостолопуло) is a 19th-century mansion in Taganrog (str. Frunze, 26), Russia. It is located on the land plot which is at the corner of Frunze Street and Italyansky Lane.

== History ==
Under a decree issued in 1806 by the Emperor Alexander I concerning the partition of land in the neighborhood of Taganrog settler Ivan Apostolopulo received a plot of 150 acres.

At the beginning of the 1870s the building on Nikolayevskaya Street, 28 (nowadays str. Frunze, 26) belonged to the bourgeoisie Maria Apostolopulo. At the end of the 1880s the house was bought by the pharmacist Yakov Solomonovich Parnokh. Possibly his children, lately known as Valentin Parnakh (1891 — 1951) and Yelizaveta Tarakhovskaya (1891 — 1968), were born in the house.

At the beginning of the 1890s the house was bought by the wealthy peasant Cleopatra Karpovna Krasnokutskaya, and at the beginning of the 20th century the attorney of District Court Konstantin Konstantinovich Popandopulo owned the building.

Around the 1910s Apostolopulo House was acquired by the 50-year-old hereditary honourable citizen Nikolay Nikolaevich Alafuzov who was considered as the rich house owner. In some sources this house is sometimes called Alafuzov House after him.

In the mid-1980s, the cellar of this house was equipped as the workshop of artists Leonid Stukanov and Yury Shabelnikov, who taught at the Taganrog Children's Art School. From the mid-1990s, there was a pharmacy in the building.

In the middle of the 2000s, the building was purchased by the owners of the IT company Coral-Micro to house their computer and office equipment store "Office World of KM", as well as a service center.

== Architectural features ==
Architectural criticism of the 1870s-1880s highly appreciated the trend that arose at that time, based on a program mix of motifs of different architectural styles (most often Renaissance, Baroque and early classicism). Buildings of this type were built in large numbers in Taganrog in the last third of the XIX century, and the house of Apostolopulo is one of them.

== Famous inhabitants ==
- Parnokh, Yakov Solomonovich (1847-1912) - pharmacist, owner of the pharmacy, a member of the city Duma of Taganrog, an honorary citizen of Taganrog.
- Stukanov, Leonid Alexandrovich (1947-1998) - Russian artist, teacher, member of the Union of Artists of Russia.
- Shabelnikov, Yury Leonidovich (1959) - Russian artist.
