= Georgy Millyar =

Soviet and Russian actor

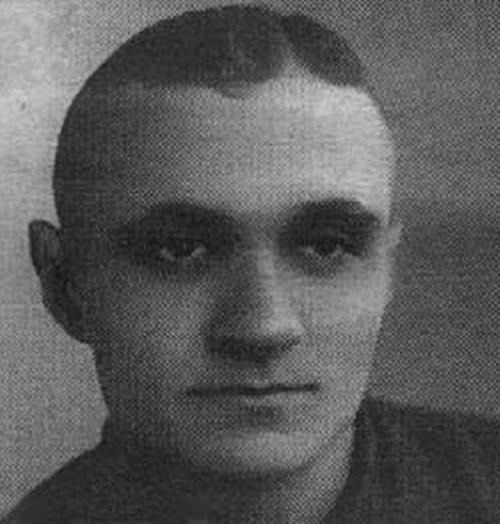
Millyar in the 1920s

Georgy Frantsevich Millyar, sometimes spelled Milliar (Russian: Георгий Францевич Милляр; 7 November 1903 – 4 June 1993), was a Soviet and Russian actor, best known for playing evil spirits in Soviet fairy tale films, notably the witch Baba Yaga in films such as Vasilisa the Beautiful, Jack Frost, Fire, Water, and Brass Pipes and The Golden Horns.

== Biography ==
Georgy Millyar was born into a wealthy family of Franz de Milieu, a French bridge builder working in Russia, and Elizaveta Zhuravlyova, a daughter of an Irkutsk goldminer. Millyar's father died when he was almost three. Before the outbreak of World War I, he and his widowed mother had moved from Moscow to Gelendzhik. After the October Revolution, Millyar's family was left without relatives and means of living, their apartment in Moscow and a house in Gelendzhik were soon nationalized by the Bolsheviks. Millyar's mother was prudent enough to remove the "de" particle from her and her son's last name to conceal their French origin and then change it to Millyar. Even though Georgy Millyar was able to speak fluent French and German, he never mentioned this fact in any official documents.

After the October Revolution, Georgy Millyar worked as a props man at a Gelendzhik theater. He always dreamed of becoming a professional actor and memorized all the roles played at his theater. In 1920, Millyar made his first incidental appearance on stage when one of the actors fell suddenly ill. His debut was a success, and from then on he was asked to substitute on a regular basis. In 1924, Georgy Millyar, already a well-known provincial actor, entered an Acting School for Juniors at Moscow Theater of the Revolution (today's Mayakovsky Theater). Subsequently, he played different roles in numerous stage plays.

Prominent Soviet film director Aleksandr Rou played an important part in Georgy Millyar's acting career. He invited Millyar to star in a film adaptation of a Russian fairy tale, Wish upon a Pike (1938). From that moment on, their cinematographic partnership and friendship lasted for over 30 years. Millyar acted in all Rou's films. Among his roles are Kashei the Deathless, Baba-Yaga, king Goroh, king Chudo-Yudo, a demon etc. Throughout his career, Georgy Millyar played thirty major roles, took part in the dubbing of seventy movies, and voiced over a hundred cartoons. He died in 1993, 2 years after the Dissolution of the Soviet Union.

== Selected filmography ==
Year	English Title	Original Title	Role
1933	Marionettes	Марионетки	bold official (uncredited)
1938	Wish upon a Pike	По щучьему веленью	Tsar Gorokh
1939	Vasilisa the Beautiful	Василиса Прекрасная	Baba Yaga; father; gusli musician
1940	Siberians	Сибиряки	Grandfather Jakov
1940	Salavat Yulayev	Салават Юлаев	mine manager
1941	The Humpbacked Horse	Конёк-Горбунок	Chikhir; gusli musician; robber
1943	We from the Urals	Мы с Урала	grandfather Tomakurov
1944	Kashchey the Immortal	Кащей Бессмертный	Kashchey; tiny magician
1947	The Humpbacked Horse (animation)	Конёк-Горбунок	Tsar (voice)
1950	Brave People	Смелые люди	German soldier with harmonica (uncredited)
1952	May Nights	Майская ночь, или Утопленница	scribe
1954	The Frog Princess (1954 cartoon) (animation)	Царевна-Лягушка	Baba Yaga (voice)
1955	The White Poodle	Белый пудель	Ivan the servant
1955	The Gadfly	Овод	beggar
1955	The Enchanted Boy (animation)	Заколдованный мальчик	goose (voice)
1958	Sampo	Сампо	sorcerer
1958	Beloved Beauty (animation)	Краса ненаглядная	Kashchey (voice)
1958	New Adventures of Puss in Boots	Новые похождения Кота в сапогах	court jester; witch
1959	The Magic Weaver	Марья-искусница	Croak
1959	Fate of a Man	Судьба человека	drunken German soldier (uncredited)
1960	It Was I Who Drew the Little Man (animation)	Человечка нарисовал я	Gerasim the painter; beggar (voices)
1961	The Night Before Christmas	Вечера на хуторе близ Диканьки	devil; gossip girl
1961	Dog Barbos and Unusual Cross	Пёс Барбос и необычный кросс	fish inspector
1962	Strictly Business	Деловые люди	Ebenezer Dorset (uncredited)
1963	Kingdom of Crooked Mirrors	Королевство кривых зеркал	The Grandest Master of Ceremonies; widow queen; carter
1964	Jack Frost	Морозко	Baba Yaga; robber
1964	An Ordinary Miracle	Обыкновенное чудо	executioner
1966	Kidnapping, Caucasian Style	Кавказская пленница, или Новые приключения Шурика	domino player
1966	Aladdin's Magic Lamp	Волшебная лампа Аладдина	the wisest advisor
1967	War and Peace	Война и мир	Morel the captive French soldier
1967	Fire, Water, and Brass Pipes	Огонь, вода и... медные трубы	Kashchey; Baba Yaga; fireman
1969	Barbara the Fair with the Silken Hair	Варвара-краса, длинная коса	Chudo-Yudo
1969	Caliph Stork	Калиф-аист	Selim
1971	Property of the Republic	Достояние республики	old railroad worker
1971	Goya or the Hard Way to Enlightenment	Гойя, или Тяжкий путь познания	messenger (uncredited)
1972	The Golden Horns	Золотые рога	Baba Yaga; grandpa Markel
1975	Finist, the brave Falcon	Финист — Ясный сокол	Kastryuk
1981	The Sixth	Шестой	old chess player
1983	Crazy Day of Engineer Barkasov	Безумный день инженера Баркасова	neighbor
1983	Mary Poppins, Goodbye	Мэри Поппинс, до свидания	raven; parrot Sir Tomas (voices)
1985	After the Rain, on Thursday	После дождичка в четверг	Babadur's vizier
1991	Act, Manya!	Действуй, Маня!	Ivan Akimovich
