= Fairer-than-a-Fairy =

Fairer-than-a-Fairy is the English title of two French literary fairy tales:

- Fairer-than-a-Fairy (Caumont de La Force) is the English translation of a tale written in 1698 by Charlotte-Rose de Caumont de La Force
- Fairer-than-a-Fairy (Mailly) is the English translation of a tale published in 1718 and attributed to the Chevalier de Mailly

== See also ==
- Charlotte-Rose de Caumont de La Force
- Chevalier de Mailly
