= Assen Bossev =

Bulgarian author of children's literature (1913–1997)

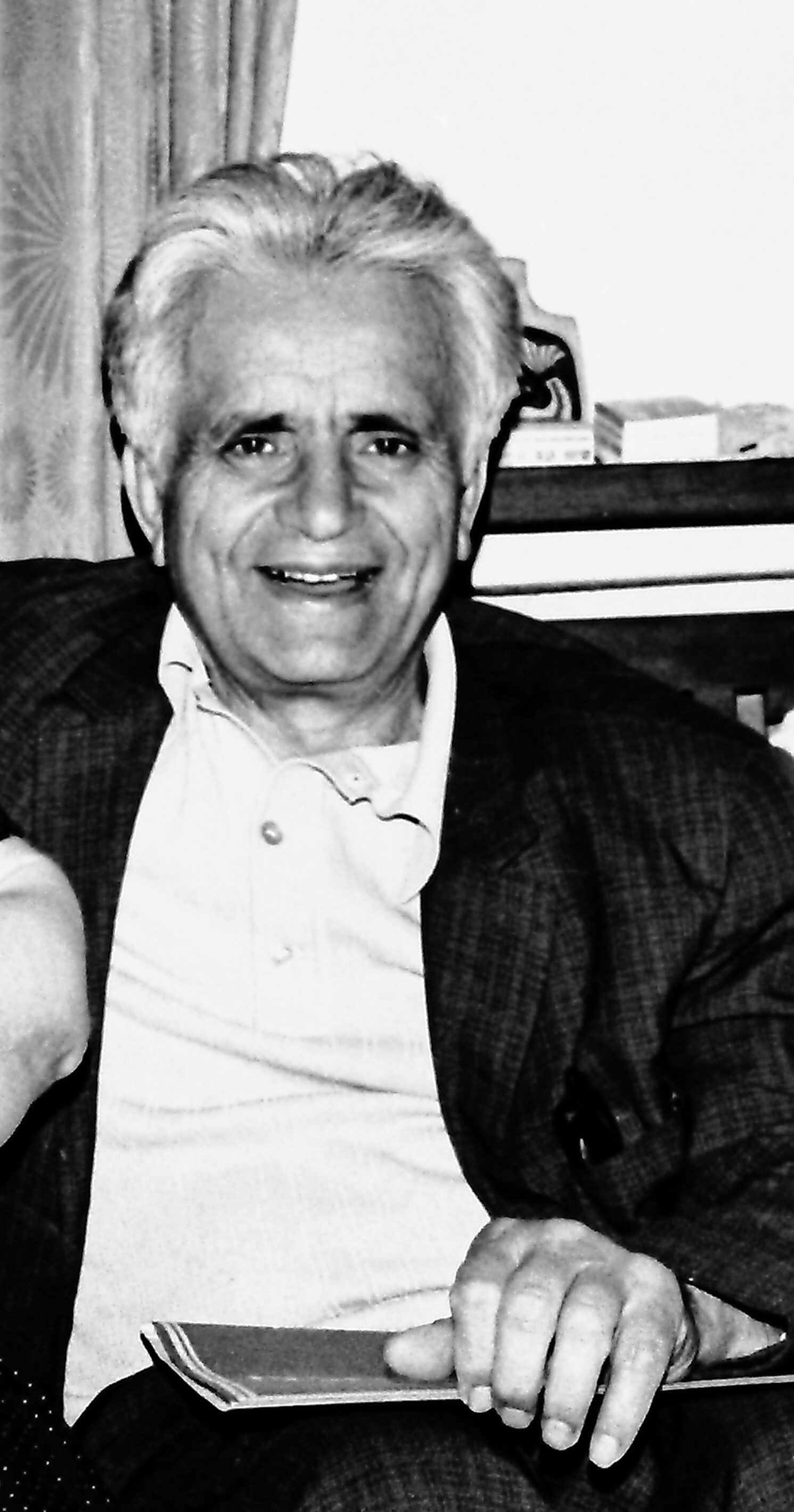
Bulgarian writer and poet Assen Bossev

Assen Bossev (Bulgarian: Асен Босев) (22 November 1913 – 24 April 1997) was a prominent Bulgarian author of children's literature, as well as a translator from Russian.

He was born in the village of Ruska Bela, Vratsa region. He was educated there as well as in the town of Berkovitsa. Afterwards, Bossev was a teacher for a certain period of time. He settled in Sofia, where he graduated in law and diplomacy.

Soviet Russian poet Yelizaveta Tarakhovskaya translated most of Bossev's poetry into Russian.

Bossev was nominated for the Hans Christian Andersen Award in 1986 and was included in the Andersen Honorary List.
