= Wish upon a Pike =

- Directed by: Aleksandr Rou
- Written by: Yelizaveta Tarakhovskaya
- Starring: Pyotr Savin; Georgy Millyar; Maria Kravchunovskaya
- Cinematography: Ivan Gorchilin
- Music by: Vladimir Kochetov
- Production company: Soyuzdetfilm
- Release date: 1938
- Running time: 56 min
- Country: Soviet Union
- Language: Russian

Wish upon a Pike, also known as The Magic Fish (Russian: По щучьему веленью, romanized: Po shchuchemu veleniyu), is a 1938 fantasy film directed by Alexander Rowe, which was his debut and filmed at Soyuzdetfilm. It is adapted from a play by Yelizaveta Tarakhovskaya, itself based on At the Pike's Behest and other tales from Slavic folklore.

The film tells the story of Yemelya the fool who catches a magical pike that grants him wishes in exchange for its life.

== Plot ==
In the dead of winter, the poor farmer's son Yemelya is not able to cut wood and then drive back home to his mother's hut because the last horse was taken from him by the Tsar. Thus he goes to get some water and ends up catching a magical pike, but decides to spare its life. Out of gratitude, the magic fish promises him that all his wishes should come true.

Meanwhile, the Tsar sends his heralds in all four directions to find a man who can make his always ill-tempered princess laugh; he announces that to this man he would give her in marriage. One of the heralds sees Yemelya and observes him as he wishes that the wood-laden sled would be able to drive home without a pulling horse. He demands that Yemelya accompany him to the Tsar, but the latter refuses – the Tsar should come to him instead.

At the Tsar's court, none of the suitors have managed to make the princess laugh, the herald returns and tells his master about the miracle he saw. Immediately, the Tsar sends his general and some soldiers to bring Yemelya. The unwilling one at first forces them to dance using a wish, but then declares himself ready to visit the tsar's court. Followed by the soldiers, he drives through the country singing and making music on a hearth, and when he arrives at the court, with his entertainment he succeeds in making the princess dance and laugh. The Tsar, however, refuses to marry off his daughter to a peasant, therefore Yemelya and princess leave the court. The Tsar angrily orders his soldier to pursue Yemelya and bring him back to the court alive or dead. The attempt to catch up Yemelya was unsuccessful.

The newly in-love couple manages to shake off the pursuers and settle in a distant place together with Yemelya's mother and honorable people. The magic fish bids goodbye to Yemelya.

== Cast ==
- Pyotr Savin as Yemelya
- Maria Kravchunovskaya as Yemelya's mother
- Georgy Millyar as Tsar Gorokh
- Sofia Terenteva as Princess Who Never Smiled
- Lev Potyomkin as General One-Two
- Ivan Moskvin as deaf boyar
- Aleksandr Zhukov as Herald
- Andrei Fajt as Mohammed Aha
- Tatyana Strukova as nurse
- Lidiya Ryumina as nurse
- Vladimir Lepko as cook
