= Yaga =

Yaga may refer to:

- Baba Yaga, a supernatural, witch-like being in Slavic mythology
- Baba Yaga (disambiguation)
- Geraldine Yaga Grimm, a character in the animated show Mysticons
- Yaga from Yaga & Mackie, a reggaeton duo from Puerto Rico
- Yaga, a 2019 play by Kat Sandler
  - Yaga (TV series), an upcoming Canadian adaptation of the play
- Yaga Gathering, a music festival in Lithuania
- Yagas, a race of cruel, black-skinned, winged humanoids from Robert E. Howard's 1939 planetary romance novel, Almuric
- Yaga Venugopal Reddy, Indian economist
- Comrade Yaga, underground name of Yaroslav Galan, Soviet Ukraininan Communist and writer
- Yaga Station (Kanagawa) (谷峨駅) on the Gotemba Line in Yamakita, Kanagawa, Japan
- Yaga Station (Hiroshima) (矢賀駅) on the Geibi Line in Higashi-ku, Hiroshima, Japan

== See also ==
- Baba Yaga (disambiguation)
