= Vasilisa the Beautiful (1977 film) =

- Film poster
- Directed by: Vladimir Pekar
- Written by: Victor Merezhko
- Produced by: Fyodor Ivanov
- Starring: Mikhail Kononov; Anna Kamenkova
- Cinematography: Kabul Rasulov
- Edited by: Natalia Stepantseva
- Music by: Yevgeny Botyarov
- Release date: 4 May 1977
- Running time: 18 minutes
- Country: USSR
- Language: Russian

Vasilisa the Beautiful (Russian: Василиса Прекрасная, romanized: Vasilisa Prekrasnaya) is a 1977 Soviet hand-drawn animated film directed by Vladimir Pekar and made by Soyuzmultfilm Studio. The story is based on the Russian folk tale The Frog Princess.

== Plot ==
The tsar wants his three sons to get married. The brothers gather into an open field and shoot arrows into different directions. The arrow of the eldest son falls at the Boyarsky Dvor, to the daughter of a Boyar; the arrow of the middle son fell into the yard of a merchant; and the arrow of the youngest son Ivan falls into the swamp. Ivan is reluctant at first about taking a frog as his bride, but she manages to convince him. The tsar then assigns 3 tasks to each of the brides to see who is most worthy of royalty.

For the first task, he asks that all three of the brides each make him a shirt "fit for a king". That night, Ivan despairs over the fact that his bride is a frog, but the frog princess, Vasilisa, tells him to get some rest. As Ivan sleeps, Vasilisa transforms into her human form. She then creates the finest shirt for the tsar. When the shirts are presented to the tsar, he abhors the other shirts, but declares Vasilisa's the most beautiful. He then assigns the second task: baking a cake fit for his holiday feast.

That night, the two other brides attempt to spy on Vasilisa, but leave soon after they realize she is still a frog. Vasilisa then returns to her human form to finish baking her cake. The next day, the tsar once again declares Vasilisa's cake the best of the three. He then asks that each of his sons bring their brides to the castle the next evening for a fine feast. Ivan is once again upset over having to present his frog bride, but Vasilisa urges him to go ahead to the feast, and that she will appear later.

As everyone arrives at the feast, the tsar notices that Ivan is arriving alone. He asks his son where his bride is. At that moment, Vasilisa appears in a coach in her human form. Everyone is astonished to see how beautiful and elegant Ivan's bride is. During the feast, Vasilisa continues to impress everyone with her dancing and magic. The other brides attempt to mimic her, which erupts in chaos as they anger the tsar with their foolishness.

While everyone is distracted, Ivan sneaks back into his room to try and find the frog. Of course, he finds nothing—other than an old frogskin on the floor. Ivan carelessly tosses the frogskin into the fireplace. Vasilisa then appears. She reprimands him sadly, explaining that had he waited for just three more days, they could have been together. As she transforms back into a frog, she tells him that if he truly loves her, he will search for her beyond the hills. She then disappears.

Ivan sets out to find Vasilisa. On his journey, he comes across a bear, a hare, a pike, and a drake, and helps each of them in some manner. He then comes across the Baba Yaga. She tells him that Vasilisa has been cursed by a powerful wizard. In order to get Vasilisa back, Ivan must defeat the wizard by destroying his kingdom. With the help of the animals whom Ivan had aided earlier, he defeats the wizard. In the end, Vasilisa and Ivan are wed, and they live happily ever after.

== Dubbing ==
- Yevgeny Leonov as Tsar
- Mikhail Kononov as Ivan
- Anna Kamenkova as Vasilisa the Beautiful
- Anastasia Georgievskaya as Baba Yaga

== See also ==
- Vasilisa the Beautiful (1939 film)
