= Baba Yaga (disambiguation) =

Baba Yaga is a supernatural creature in Slavic mythology, appearing as an old woman.

Baba Yaga may also refer to:

== Fictional characters ==
- Yaga (a younger incarnation of Baba Yaga) is the main character in the 2022 video game Blacktail
- Baba Yaga, a witch who eats children in the 2021 animated film Secret Magic Control Agency
- Baba Yaga (Hellboy), a character in the Hellboy comic series and the 2019 film Hellboy
- "Baba Yaga", a nickname for the 2014–2017 character John Wick
- Baba Yaga, a character in the 2011–2017 novel series Lord Marksman and Vanadis
- Baba Yaga, a character in the 2002–2015 comic book series Fables
- Baba Yaga, a 1986 character from the video game series Castlevania
- Baba Yaga (Dungeons & Dragons), a powerful antagonist in the fantasy role playing game Dungeons & Dragons
- The Tale About Baba-Yaga, Russian fairy tale collected in the late 18th century.

== Films and television ==
- Baba Yaga, a 2021 animated film directed by Eric Darnell
- Baba Yaga: Terror of the Dark Forest, a 2020 Russian horror film
- "Baba Yaga", the first episode of the 1989 TV series Valentina (TV series)
- Baba Yaga (1973 film), an Italian-French erotic thriller directed by Corrado Farina
- Baba Yaga (2023 film), a Russian animated fantasy adventure film

== Other uses ==
- Baba Yaga (aircraft), Ukrainian military drone
- Baba Yaga: The Temple of the Witch, playable bonus level of the 2015 video game Rise of the Tomb Raider
- Tamara Samsonova, Russian serial killer known as Granny Ripper or Baba Yaga
- Baba Yaga (album), 1999 studio album by Norwegian musician Annbjørg Lien
- "The Baba Yaga", story in the 1998 comic book Hellboy: The Chained Coffin and Others
- Baba-Yaga, symphonic poem by Anatoly Lyadov (1904)

== See also ==
- Yaga (disambiguation)
