= Mare's Head =

Ukrainian fairy tale

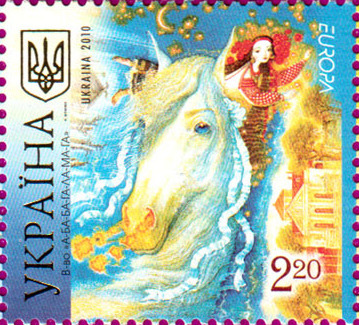
"Mare's Head" (Ukrainian: Кобиляча голова), "Children's Books" series, 2010 stamp of Ukrposhta, Ukraine national postal service

"Mare's Head" (Ukrainian: «Кобиляча голова», romanized: Kobyliacha holova) is a Ukrainian folk tale in which a character of the same name is a creature who thanks a good girl for her hospitality and punishes an inhospitable girl. A variation is called "The Old Man's Daughter and the Old Woman's Daughter" which features a similar plot, but does not include a mare's head.

== Plot ==
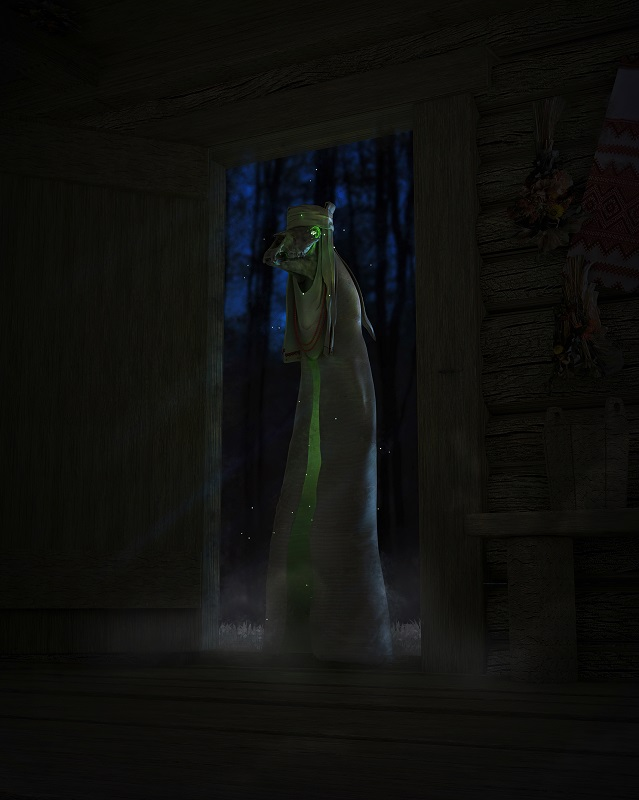
Mare's Head, Ukrainian fairy tale character

A man and wife have a daughter. When the wife passes away, the man marries a widow with a daughter so that both daughters live in their house together. The stepmother is wicked and sometimes called Baba Yaga. The wicked stepmother hates her stepdaughter and orders the girl's father to take her to the forest to be killed by animals. For the trip, the girl (the mother's stepdaughter) is given a sack she is told contains a knot of wheat flour and a knot of lard.

While walking through the forest, the father and daughter come across a path that leads to a cabin, where the daughter is left. When the daughter unwraps the knots, she finds only ashes inside, so she takes food from the pantry of the empty hut. Although the girl's father promises his daughter to stay, the father returns home instead. Before he leaves, he hangs a log on the corner of the hut, which when the wind blows makes a sound against the wall as if the father is chopping firewood. Having prepared dinner, the daughter calls for her father (thinking he is still there). She calls out three times, ""Oh, who's in the forest, who's behind the forest, come to my house for dinner!" Having called three times, the mare's head is summoned, who answers her call instead of the girl's father, and who knocks on the door of the hut.

When the girl answers the door, the mare's head asks the girl for hospitality: to be invited into the hut by the girl, for the girl to put the stove on, and for the girl to feed the mare's head. For these actions, the mare's head thanks the girl, telling to take treasures from her ears, by climbing into one ear of the mare's head and out of the other. After doing so, the Mare's head disappears. The girl then becomes beautiful with countless riches, after which the girl returns home to her father.

The man's daughter returns home, but upon meeting her stepmother leaves her parents. Seeing the stepdaughter's transformation, the stepmother wishes the same wealth for her own daughter and asks her husband to take her own daughter to the same hut in the woods. He does so. Following the same pattern, when evening comes, the mare's head flies into the hut, but the stepmother's own daughter does not show the hospitality the stepdaughter provided the mare's head. The mare's head then tells the woman's daughter to go in one of its ears and out the other. When the woman's daughter refuses, the Mare's head eats the woman's daughter, placing the bones of the woman's daughter in a bag.

The woman's dog foretells that her daughter is dead. For this, the woman breaks the dog's legs and eventually kills the dog. The woman sends her husband to the hut, who finds the bones. The woman then accuses her husband of murder.

== Analysis ==
The tale is classified in the international Aarne-Thompson-Uther Index as tale type ATU 480. According to Jack V. Haney, the image of a mare's head is common in Ukrainian folktales.

Horses and their skulls had religious significance and were thought to have protective properties; their skulls were displayed to ward off evil and horse remains were sometimes buried in the same cemeteries as human graves. Use of skull masks were considered an attribute of Dziady (Day of the Ancestors), also called Forefather's Eve, comparable to the Celtic traditions of Samhain or Mari Lwyd.

Ukrainian folklorist, Viktor Davydyuk, explained the mare's head as a participant in the initiation rite, wearing a mask, symbolizing a totem. According to Davidyuk, the origin of the tale can be traced back to the 4th millennium BC, when the horse was domesticated in the Middle Dnieper region.

== See also ==
- Category:Ukrainian fairy tales
- Ukrainian Fairy Tale
- UK:Кобиляча голова
- The Kind and the Unkind Girls (tale type ATU 480)
- Vasilisa the Beautiful
