= The Golden Horns =

- Theatrical release poster
- Directed by: Aleksandr Rou
- Screenplay by: Mikhail Nozhkin (poems); Lev Potyomkin (writer); Aleksandr Rou (writer)
- Starring: Raisa Ryazanova; Georgiy Millyar
- Cinematography: Yuri Dyakonov; Vladimir Okunev
- Edited by: Hildegard Smiegovsky
- Music by: Arkady Filippenko
- Production company: Gorky Film Studios
- Release date: January 1, 1973; (Soviet Union)
- Running time: 74 minutes
- Country: Soviet Union
- Language: Russian

The Golden Horns (Russian: Золотые рога, romanized: Zolotye roga), also known in English as Baba Yaga, is a 1973 Soviet fairy tale film. It was director Alexander Rou's last film before his death later in 1973.

While collecting mushrooms in the forest, sisters Masha and Dasha get turned into does by the evil Baba Yaga. Their mother Yevdokia goes in search of them, while their brother Kiryusha also attempts to find the sisters.

== Plot ==
In the forest lives a magnificent deer with golden antlers, who protects the poor and the weak, but prefers to avoid the evil. In the village near the forest lives the widow Yevdokia (Raisa Ryazanova) with her twins Maschenka (Ira Tchigrinova) and Daschenka (Lena Tchigrinova), their big brother Kiryushka (Volodya Belov) and the ancient grandfather. One day, while mushrooming, the twins see the stag as it is being hunted down by robbers. A short time later, despite their mother's prohibition, they decide to go deeper into the forest (to the birch grove at the swamp) to find even more mushrooms. Forest spirits lure them even deeper into the forest until they find the "king's mushroom" that they simply want to take along. The witch Baba Yaga (Georgiy Millyar) finds them and is angry about their behavior — she transforms them into deer fawns with a magic spell.

The worried widow goes with her dog in search of her daughters. On the way she meets the "deer with the golden antlers" and rescues him from the robbers by sending them in the wrong direction. In gratitude, the deer gives her a magic ring and recommends her to go to the "Red Sun" to find her daughters. In the meanwhile, Kiryushka decides to seek his sisters on his own with the cat Vaska. When the mother comes to the "Red Sun", it sends her to its little brother, the "Clear Moon", but even this one can not help her and sends her to the "Wind", who sees everything and knows everything. Meanwhile, the gang of robbers enjoys a hearty celebration.

It turns out that the "Wind" knows where her daughters are — in the realm of the witch Baba Yaga. The witch sees Yevdokia come from afar and starts a forest fire, but the ring protects the mother. At night, Baba Yaga, disguised by a cloak of invisibility, goes hunting with her walking "witch's house on chicken legs". She meets Kiryushka, whom she turns into a goat, but the cat Vaska manages to escape and finds Yevdokia whom he leads to the witch. When the widow finally meets Baba Yaga, the fight between "good" and "evil" takes place. Yevdokiya gets a little "Russian soil" out of a sack that was given to her and transforms into a Valkyrie with the words "Homeland, save us!", and starts her fight against Satan's devotee Baba Yaga. She wins the battle, breaks the witch's spell and frees her children. The inhabitants of the forest, redeemed by the witch, drive away the robbers and poor Baba Yaga is thrown into the swamp together with her witch's house.

== Cast ==
- Raisa Ryazanova: Yevdokia
- Volodya Belov: Kirill "Kiryushka"
- Ira Tchigrinova: Mashenka
- Lena Tchigrinova: Dashenka
- Georgy Millyar: Baba Yaga
- Aleksei Smirnov: Old Wood Spirit Kapytonich
- Yuri Kharchenko: Wood Spirit Khokhrik
- Ivan Baida: Wood Spirit Tyap
- Aleksandr Gorbachyov: Wood Spirit Lyap
- Mikhail Pugovkin: Robber Chief Irod
- Vera Altayskaya: Cook
- Valentin Bryleev: Moon
- Alexander Khvylya: Wind
- Margarita Korabelnikova: Zadorinka
- Savely Kramarov: Sunduk
- Lev Potyomkin: Water spirit
- Boris Sichkin: Dandellion
- Zoya Tolbuzina: House spirit Suchok (as Zoya Zemnukhova)
- Roman Yurev-Lunts: Bandit
- Anastasia Zuyeva: Storyteller
