= Vasilisa the Beautiful (1940 film) =

- Directed by: Alexander Rou
- Written by: O. Nechayeva; Vladimir Shvejtser; G. Vladychina
- Starring: Georgy Millyar; Sergey Stolyarov; Lev Potyomkin
- Cinematography: Ivan Gorchilin
- Edited by: Kseniya Blinova
- Music by: Leonid Polovinkin
- Production company: Soyuzdetfilm
- Release date: May 13, 1940
- Running time: 72 minutes
- Country: Soviet Union
- Language: Russian

Vasilisa the Beautiful (Russian: Василиса Прекрасная, romanized: Vasilisa prekrasnaya) is a 1940 Soviet children's fantasy film produced by Soyuzdetfilm and directed by Alexander Rou. It was based on a traditional Russian fairy tale The Frog Tsarevna (Vasilisa the Wise), rather than the fairy tale of the same name.

== Plot ==
A desperate peasant demands that both of his two eldest, good-for-nothing sons use a bow and arrow to seek a bride wherever the arrows fall. The arrow of the oldest brother Anton strikes at a snooty nobleman's daughter, while the arrow of the middle brother Agafon gets stuck in the vicinity of a food-addicted merchant's daughter. The youngest son, Ivan, wants to do the same as his elder brothers but shoots the arrow into a swamp, where he finds only an ugly toad. Once home, to see if they are worthy of a peasant, the old farmer tells the future wives to farm the land around the hut and himself goes off with his sons to mow fields. However, the two women have learned nothing and only throw the toad out of the house. Then, out of the toad skin a pretty girl emerges who starts to do the required work. They notice her singing and find the skin. In dispute, they tear it in half and throw the remains into the fire.

When the men return home, the two brides claim all the farm work as their own but then the girl, Vasilisa, reveals herself. She tells her stunned audience that was transformed by a dragon because she refused to marry him. As a punishment, she was to live at the bottom of a lake for three years; the due date was almost over, but because the two women burned her toad skin, she would now be fetched by the dragon's sister, an old witch. As the sky darkens, a terrible storm breaks out and Vasilisa disappears. The two older sons – horrified by their brides' behavior – throw them and their possessions off the farm, and the two weeping women return to their original town. The old man then gives his youngest son advice: "Far away from here in the dark spruce forest are three large, old oaks. Wait until the cuckoo calls three times, then you will find a well at the feet of the oak trees. At the bottom of this fountain, behind an oak fence and a castle that weighs a hundred quintal, lies a miracle sword of fine steel. If you find the key to the castle, you can defeat the dragon."

The youth, therefore, sets out on a journey to seek the key. On his journey, he meets a blacksmith who tells him that the key is in a golden egg inside a duck sitting in a glass chest. However, this chest would be at the highest point of a tall pine. At the witches' house meanwhile, the witch suggests Vasilisa to marry her brother, she would live in a palace and be rich, but Vasilisa refuses again. In the meantime, the warrior has arrived in the forest, where the invisible witch gives him a beating, but he resists. Then she invokes an enchanted bear for him. Only barely can he escape its paws, but finally defeats it, spares it and thus becomes friends with the bears of the forest. In a third strike, the witch splits the earth to prevent the warrior from progressing, but Ivan finds a narrow path over which he tries to overcome the deep-roaring river. Arriving in the middle of the transition, the evil old woman brings him to collapse and the youth falls into the abyss under the sound of her loud laughter. Back home, she reveals to Vasilisa that her lover is no longer alive, but she still does not consent. Meanwhile, Ivan, with the help of the bears, succeeds to free himself from the torrent. He climbs up the ravine and reaches the high pine, which is climbed by the bears. At the top they throw down the glass chest. The chest shatters and the duck escapes. Then the youth shoots it with his bow and the egg falls to the ground.

With the key in his luggage, he covertly seeks out his Vasilisa, which causes his attention to be drawn to a forbidden well. When the cuckoo sounds three times, he goes there, climbs down and finds a huge lock on the fence made of oak. He puts the key in the lock, whereupon it shatters and the door opens. He ends up trapped in a web of spiders, whose huge owner charges him with three puzzles that he must solve or that his life is forfeited. After answering the questions, he receives the sword and sets off for the three-headed dragon Zmey Gorynych who wants to marry his Vasilisa. A fight between the adversaries commences. The fire and water-spouting dragon stretches out menacingly, but unexpectedly he succeeds in a surprise strike against the monster, whereby the first head is knocked off. In the further course of the fight, the hero climbs a rock and pushes down from above on the dragon to take the second head. Meanwhile, Vasilisa fights the witch and she manages to throw her into a large pot of boiling water. The witch wants to escape from the cauldron, but because of the lid, the old woman is trapped inside. Finally, through a last powerful prank, the knight attacks the firestorming dragon's head and knocks it down. The two lovers then ride home.

== Cast ==
- Georgy Millyar as the father and as Baba-Yaga
- Sergey Stolyarov as Ivan, the youngest son
- Lev Potyomkin as Agaphon, the middle son
- Nikita Kondratiev, as Anton the oldest son
- Valentina Sorogozhskaya as Vasilisa the Beautiful (Vasilisa the Wise)
- Irina Zarubina as Malanya, the merchant's daughter
- Lidiya Sukharevskaya as Belyandryasa, the aristocrat's daughter
- Tatyana Barysheva as Malanya's mother
- Mariya Barabanova as Bell-ringer
- L. Skavronskaya

== See also ==
- Vasilisa the Beautiful (1977 film)
