= Vasilisa the Beautiful =

Russian folk tale

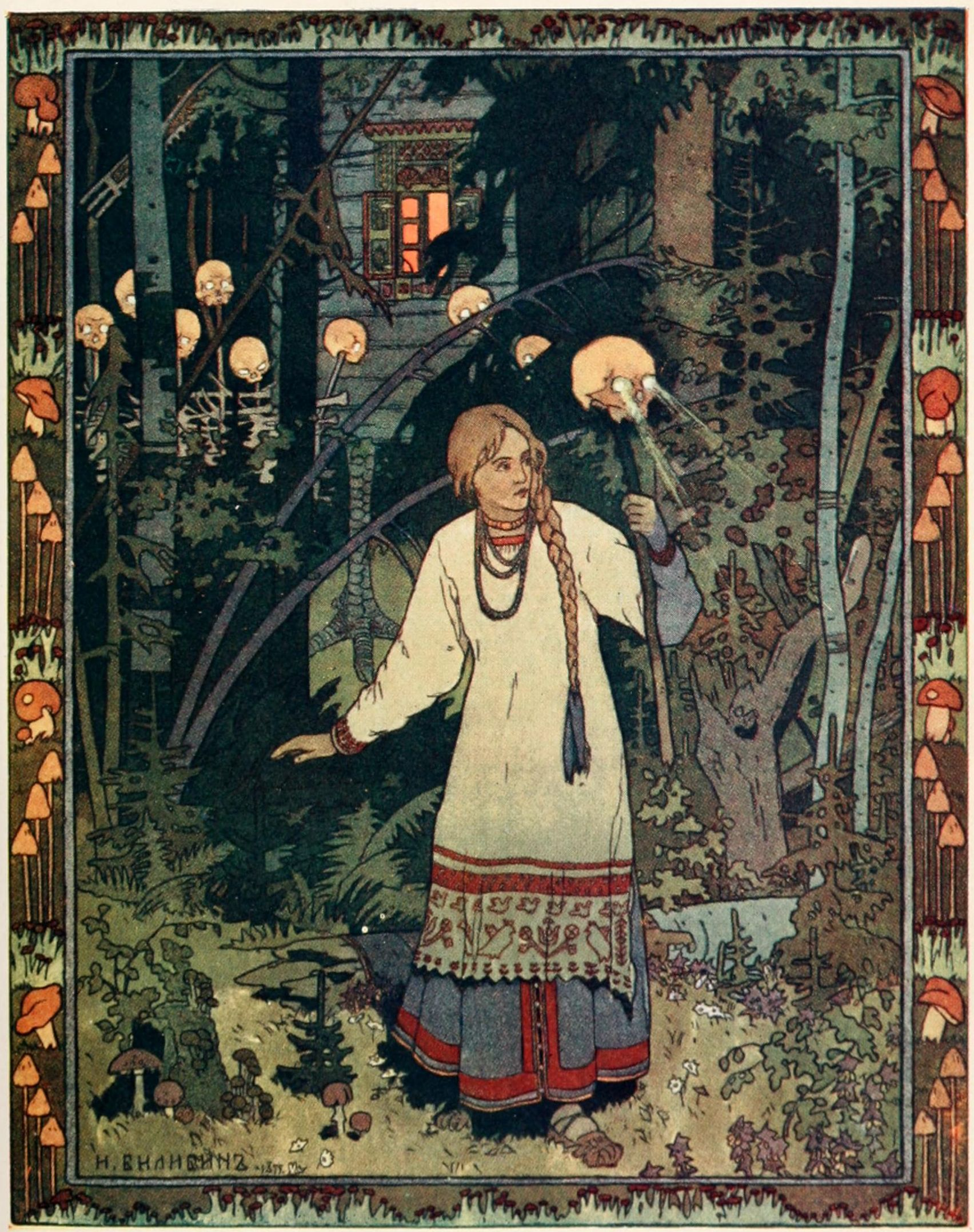
Vasilisa at the Hut of Baba Yaga, by Ivan Bilibin

Vasilisa the Beautiful (Russian: Василиса Прекрасная) or Vasilisa the Fair is a Russian fairy tale collected by Alexander Afanasyev in Narodnye russkie skazki.

== Synopsis ==
A merchant's wife dies, leaving behind an 8-year-old daughter named Vasilisa. Before her death, the merchant's wife gives Vasilisa a doll with her blessing. The doll has a secret: if it is given something to eat, it can help its owner out of trouble. The merchant eventually remarries to a widow with two daughters the same age as Vasilisa. The new wife dislikes her stepdaughter, giving her various backbreaking jobs, but the doll does all the work for Vasilisa. When Vasilisa grows up, all the suitors in the city begin to woo her. The stepmother refuses everyone, proclaiming that she would not give up her youngest before her elders.

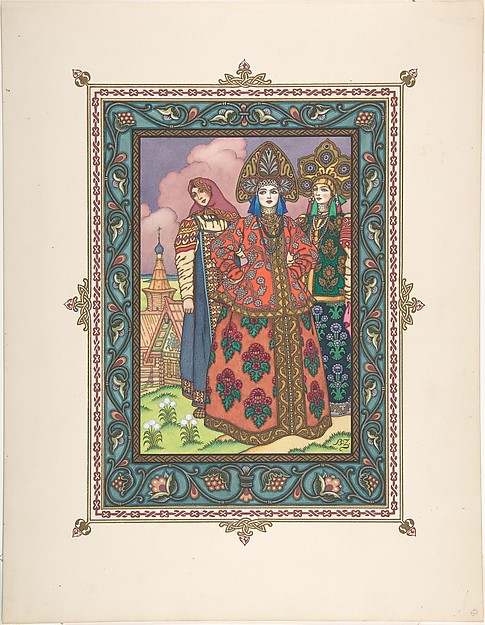
Vasilisa and her step-sisters (wearing kokoshniks), by Boris Zvorykin

One day the merchant leaves home for a long time on business, and during this time, at the stepmother's bidding, the family moves to live in another house, standing near a dense forest, where Baba Yaga's hut is located. The stepmother often sends Vasilisa into the forest, hoping that Baba Yaga will devour her, but Vasilisa's doll always guides her to avoid dangerous paths. Finally, the stepmother and her daughters agree to send Vasilisa directly to Baba Yaga's hut for fire, since during the autumn women's work (weaving, knitting and spinning), which is done at night, all fires excluding a single candle are deliberately extinguished. The doll, as usual, promises to take care of Vasilisa's safety, and she sets off on her journey.

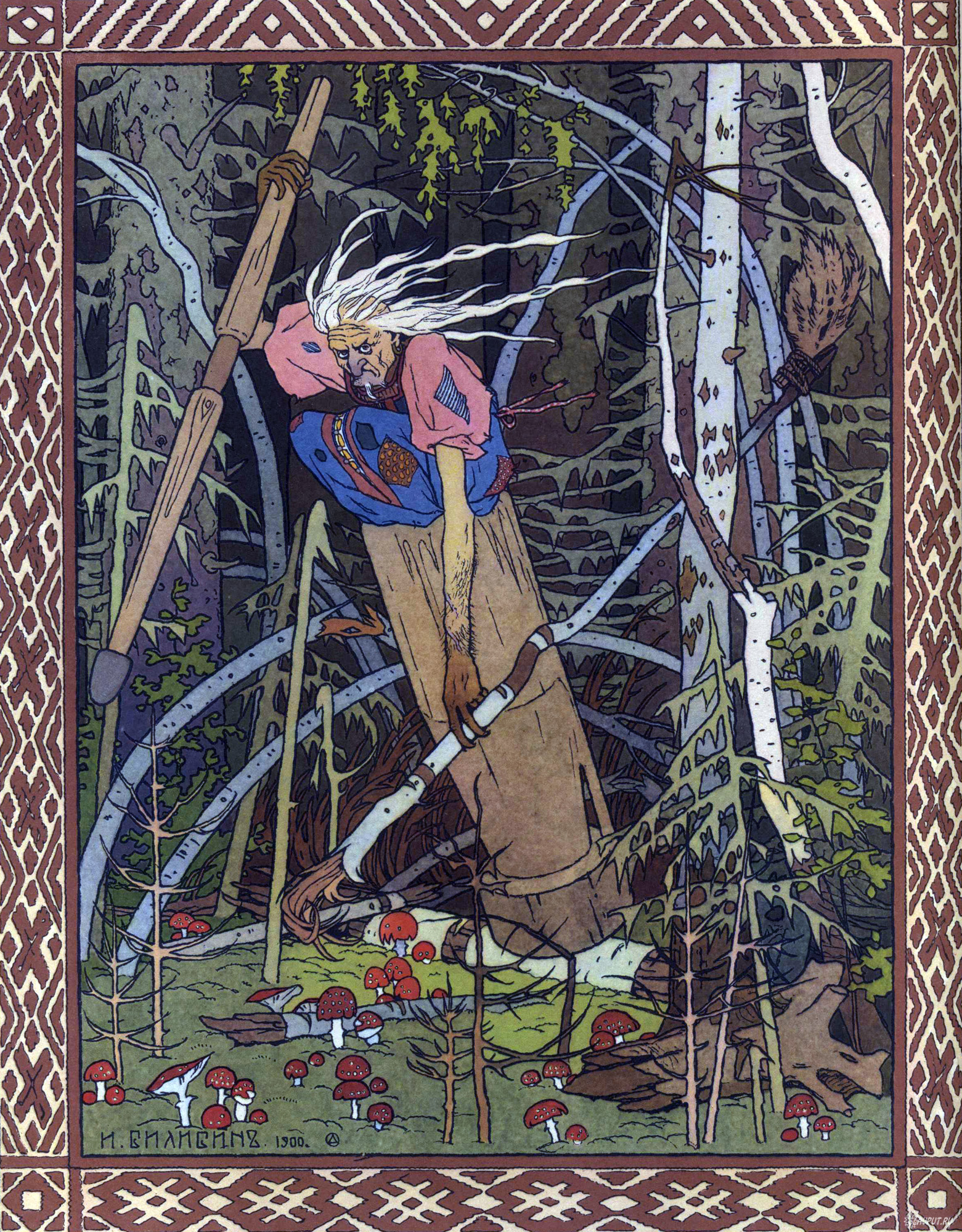
Baba Yaga in her mortar, by Ivan Bilibin

On her way she is passed by three horsemen dressed in white, red and black. On Baba Yaga's fence, made of human bones, skulls are hung, the eye sockets of which illuminate the surroundings with their light like lanterns. Baba Yaga rides out of the forest in her flying mortar and heeds Vasilisa's request. Baba Yaga demands that she, under pain of death, first work as a servant. At Baba Yaga's command, the gates open and then lock themselves. Baba Yaga gives Vasilisa various tasks, but she completes everything on time with the doll's help. The colored horsemen pass by the hut, and Vasilisa discovers Baba Yaga's assistants: three pairs of hands that respond and appear at the call of her voice. Baba Yaga explains that the white, red and black horsemen are respectively Day, Sun and Night, but does not explain what the hands are, warning that she dislikes those who air her personal affairs in public, and that she eats those who are too curious.

Eventually, Baba Yaga asks Vasilisa how she managed to accomplish her work so well. When Vasilisa responds that she did so by her mother's blessing, Baba Yaga throws her out of her home, rejecting those who are blessed. However, Baba Yaga gifts Vasilisa a skull with burning eyes to use as a lamp. Vasilisa wants to get rid of it, but the skull warns her against this, asking to be taken to her stepmother's house. There, the light coming from the skull's eye sockets incinerates the stepmother and her two daughters. Vasilisa buries the skull and moves to the city, where she settles with an old woman, deciding to take up spinning and weaving while waiting for her father to return. The fabric that comes out of Vasilisa's hands is so thin that the old woman states it belongs in the royal palace and nowhere else. The king asks to sew him blouses from this fabric, which turns out to be a craft only Vasilisa herself can manage. Appreciating her skillful work, the king demands to see the young woman personally, and once that happens, charmed by her beauty, takes Vasilisa as his wife. Her father returns from his trading trip and remains to live at court. Vasilisa also brings the old woman into court, and carries the doll in her pocket for the rest of her life.

== Analysis ==
=== Tale type ===
Russian scholarship classifies the tale as type SUS 480В*, "Мачеха и падчерица" ("Stepmother and Step-daughter"), of the East Slavic Folktale Classification (Russian: СУС, romanized: SUS): the heroine is sent to fetch fire from Baba Yaga, and is helped by a magical doll in fulfilling the witch's tasks. Professor Jack V. Haney classified the tale as type AT 480B*, in the Aarne-Thompson-Uther Index.

== Variants ==
In some versions, the tale ends with the death of the stepmother and stepsisters, and Vasilisa lives peacefully with her father after their removal. This lack of a wedding is unusual in a tale with a grown heroine, although some, such as Jack and the Beanstalk, do feature it. In some versions, Baba Yaga has a daughter, who befriends Vasilisa.

According to Jiří Polívka, in a Slovak tale from West Hungary, the heroine meets a knight or lord clad in all red, riding a red horse, with a red bird on his hand and red dog by his side. She also meets two similarly dressed lords: one in all white, and the other in all black. The heroine's stepmother explains that the red lord was the Morning, the white lord the Day and the black lord the Night.

== Interpretations ==
In common with many folklorists of his day, Alexander Afanasyev regarded many tales as primitive ways of viewing nature. In such an interpretation, he regarded this fairy tale as depicting the conflict between the sunlight (Vasilisa), the storm (her stepmother), and dark clouds (her stepsisters).

== Related and eponymous works ==
Edith Hodgetts included an English translation of this story, as Vaselesa the Beautiful in her 1890 collection Tales and Legends from the Land of the Tzar.

Aleksandr Rou made a film entitled Vasilisa the Beautiful in 1940, however, it was based on a different tale – The Frog Tsarevna. American author Elizabeth Winthrop wrote a children's book – Vasilissa the Beautiful: a Russian Folktale (HarperCollins, 1991), illustrated by Alexander Koshkin. There is also a Soviet cartoon – Vasilisa the Beautiful, but it is also based on the Frog Tsarevna tale.

The story is also part of a collection of Russian fairy tales titled Vasilisa The Beautiful: Russian Fairy Tales published by Raduga Publishers first in 1966. The book was edited by Irina Zheleznova, who also translated many of the stories in the book from the Russian including Vasilisa The Beautiful. The book was also translated in Hindi and Marathi.

The 1998 feminist fantasy anthology Did You Say Chicks?! contains two alternate reimaginings of "Vasilisa the Beautiful". Laura Frankos' "Slue-Foot Sue and the Witch in the Woods" humorously supplants Vasilisa with the American explorer Slue-Foot Sue, wife of Pecos Bill. "A Bone to Pick" by Marina Frants and Keith R.A. DeCandido is somewhat more serious in tone, reimagining Yaga as a firm but benevolent mentor and Vasilisa as her fiercely loyal protégé, who is also described as ugly rather than beautiful. Frants' and DeCandido's story was followed up in the succeeding volume Chicks 'n Chained Males (1999) with the sequel "Death Becomes Him," which is credited to Frants alone and features Koschei the Deathless as the antagonist.

Vasilisa appears in the 2007 comic book Hellboy: Darkness Calls to assist Hellboy against Koschei the Deathless with her usual story of the Baba Yaga. The book also includes other characters of Slavic folklore, such as a Domovoi making an appearance. She returns in the two Koscei mini-series that follow.

A graphic version of the Vasilisa story, drawn by Kadi Fedoruk (creator of the webcomic Blindsprings), appears in Valor: Swords, a comic anthology of re-imagined fairy tales that pays homage to the strength, resourcefulness, and cunning of female heroines in fairy tales through recreations of time-honored tales and brand new stories, published by Fairylogue Press in 2014 following a successful Kickstarter campaign.

The novel Vassa in the Night by Sarah Porter is based on this folktale with a modern twist.

The book Vasilisa the Terrible: A Baba Yaga Story flips the script by painting Vasilisa as a villain and Baba Yaga as an elderly woman who is framed by the young girl.

In Annie Baker's 2017 play The Antipodes, one of the characters, Sarah, tells a story from her childhood that is reminiscent of the story of Vasilisa.

The book series Vampire Academy by Richelle Mead features a supporting character named Vasilisa, and is mentioned that she was named after Vasilisa from Vasilisa the Beautiful.

The Winternight trilogy by Katherine Arden, beginning with "The Bear and the Nightingale" is a retelling of this story.

In 2019, Phidal Publishing released a child-friendly version of the story.

Vasilisa (along with her doll) appears as a minor character in Alexander Utkin's graphic novels Gamayun Tales I (2019) and a major character in Gamayun Tales II (2020), although both volumes leave her story as cliffhangers for the next volume.

== See also ==
- Fairer-than-a-Fairy
- Folklore of Russia
- Vasilisa (name)
- The Two Caskets
- Cinderella
- Babushka's Doll by Patricia Polacco
- The Kind and the Unkind Girls (ATU 480)
- Mare's Head
