= Ruska Bela =

Village in Bulgaria

Coordinates: 43°10′N 23°39′E

Ruska Bela (Bulgarian: Руска Бела) is a village in northwestern Bulgaria, part of Mezdra Municipality, Vratsa Province.
