= Valentin Parnakh =

Soviet musician and choreographer

Valentin Yakovlevich Parnakh (Russian: Валентин Яковлевич Парнах) (1891–1951) was a Soviet musician and choreographer, who was a founding father of Soviet jazz. He was also a poet, and translated many foreign works into Russian, notably Spanish poetry and plays.

== Early years ==
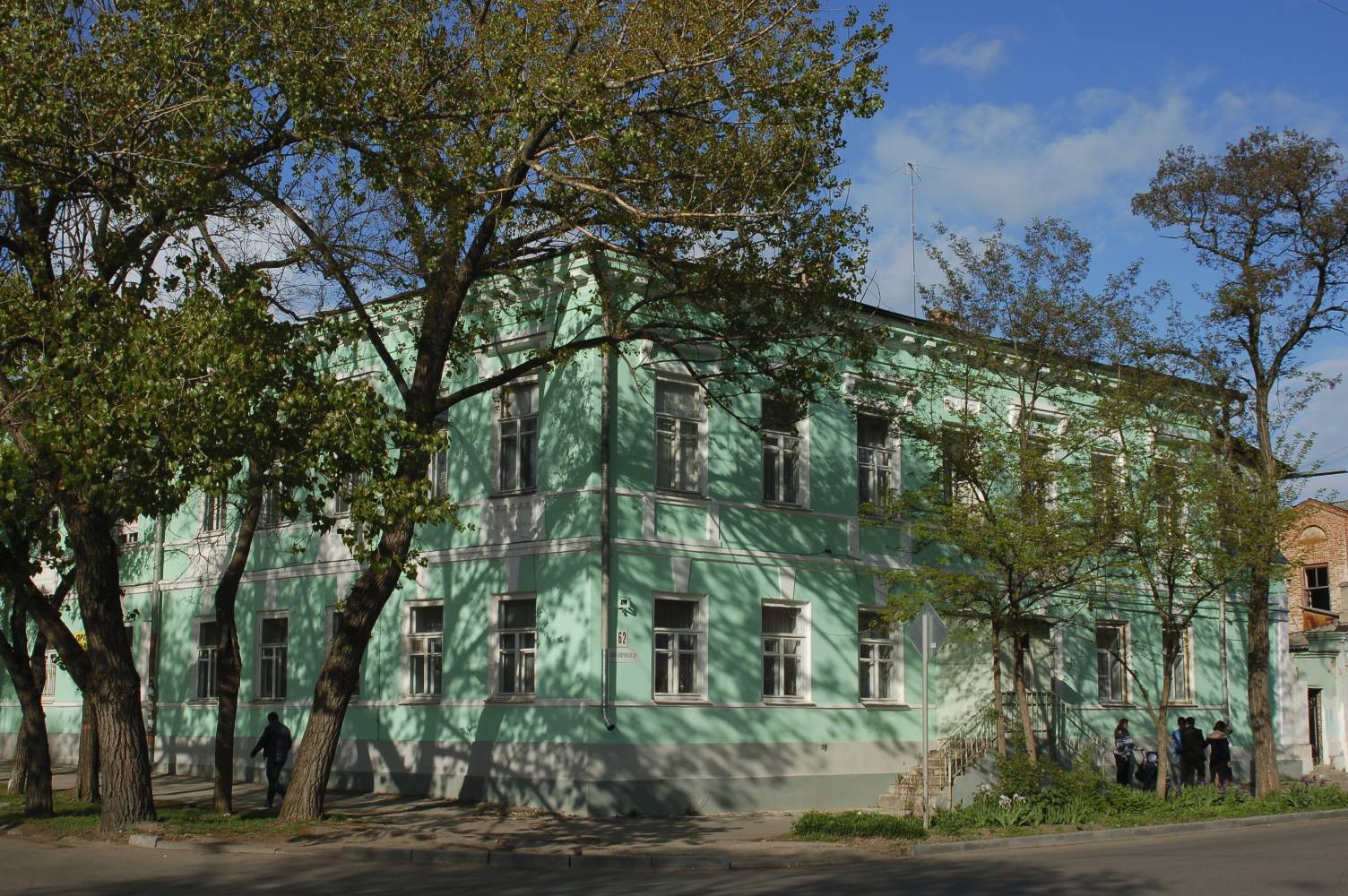
Birth house of Parnakh in Taganrog.

Parnakh was born into a Jewish family in the Azov Sea port of Taganrog on July 26, 1891. His twin sister was the children's author Yelizaveta Tarakhovskaya and an older sister the poet Sophia Parnok. His family name was Parnokh but he later changed it to the more Sephardic–sounding Parnakh (his sister Sophia also later changed her name, but to the less Jewish-sounding Parnok). Parnakh's mother, a doctor, died when he was very young, and his father, a pharmacist, remarried soon after.

In 1913, Parnakh traveled to Italy and the Middle East, staying for a while in Palestine and returning to Saint Petersburg the same year. In Saint Petersburg, he entered the University, where he studied Romance languages, music (under the direction of Mikhail Gnesin) and theater (under direction of Vsevolod Meyerhold). In 1916, while World War I was raging, he moved to Paris, where he stayed for six years. He studied at Sorbonne University and was elected President of the Paris Chamber of Poets, and became fascinated by the jazz music he discovered in Paris.

== Jazz in the USSR ==
In 1922, feeling alienated from most of the political emigrants from Russia, Parnakh returned to Russia, bringing jazz scores, saxophones, tam-tams, and trumpet sordinos, and he soon founded the "First Eccentric Orchestra of the Russian Federated Socialist Republic - Valentin Parnakh's Jazz Band", which held its debut concert at the Russian Academy of Theatre Arts in Moscow on October 1, 1922. This New Orleans–style jazz band became popular and influential among the artists of the Russian avant-garde of those days.

Parnakh was also creative director for music and choreography at Vsevolod Meyerhold's Meyerhold Theater, where his Eccentric Orchestra performed hits of the time, such as Kitten on the Keyboards and the ballet suite The Bull on the Roof. Parnokh greatly influenced Meyerhold's "Biomechanics" acting method, and his band appeared in the 1924 play Trest D.E. (directed by Meyerhold and based on Ilya Ehrenburg's 1923 novel Trust D.E.).

On May 1, 1923, Parnokh's band performed before members the Comintern participating in the Agricultural Expo. The Soviet press of the time wrote: "For the first time jazz music was performed at an official state function, something which has never happened in the West".

Parnokh also published numerous articles on the contemporary music culture of the West and was the first to promote the work of Charlie Chaplin and the first to introduce French Dadaist poetry into the Soviet Union. In 1925, he published a book of poems, Introduction To Dance (which included a portrait of Parnokh by Picasso).

== Paris and return to Russia ==
However, by 1925 Parnokh had become disillusioned with life in the Soviet Union, where publishing houses were refusing to publish his poetry and his translations of the French poet Gérard de Nerval. In October 1925 Parnokh returned to Paris, where he published many articles on theater and dance in Russian immigrant newspapers and in the French press and translated Spanish literature.

The main character of Osip Mandelshtam's 1928 novella Egyptian Stamp is named "Parnok" and was perceived by Parnakh as a derogatory caricature.

Parnokh returned to the Soviet Union at the end of 1931 and served as a translator at the Foreign Board of the Writers Union. He continued his translations of Spanish writers such as Federico García Lorca.

In 1934 Parnokh published a Russian translation of a collection of Spanish and Portuguese poets (mostly Marrano Jews) who had been executed by the Inquisition (Parnakh had previously translated the poems into French as well, but the manuscript of this translation had been lost).

== Later years ==
During World War II, Parnakh, like many other members of the Writers Union, were evacuated to Chistopol and had absolutely no means of support. Desperately seeking work, he applied together with the poet Marina Tsvetaeva (a long-ago lover of his sister Sophia) to the Soviet Literature Fund asking for a job at the LitFund's canteen. He was hired as a doorman, while Tsvetaeva's application for a dishwasher's position was turned down and she committed suicide six days later.

Parnakh's only work to be published after the war was his translation of memoirs by Théodore–Agrippa d'Aubigné in 1949, with his own foreword rejected by the publishing house. Parnakh outlived Tsvetaeva by a decade and died in his Moscow apartment on January 29, 1951. He was buried at the Novodevichy Cemetery in Moscow. His twin sister, who died in 1968, is buried near him.

== Filmography ==
- «The Adventures of Oktyabrina». Moscow, 1924. Dir. G. Kozintsev, L. Trauberg.
- «Vesyolye rebyata» (In credits it isn't specified). Moscow, Mosfilm, 1934. Dir. G. Aleksandrov.
- «Valentin Parnakh: not here and not now». Taganrog, 2011. Dir. Mikhail Basov.

== See also ==
- Russian avant-garde
- Sophia Parnok
- Yelizaveta Tarakhovskaya
- Vsevolod Meyerhold

== Publications ==
- Le Quai (with 2 drawings by Mikhail Larionov). Paris, 1919.
- Samum (with 3 illustrations by Natalia Goncharova). Paris, 1919.
- Slovodvig (Mot Dynamo): Poems. Paris: La Cible, 1920.
- The Acrobat Climbs. Paris: Franco-Russian Publishing House, 1922.
- Introduction To Dance: Selected Poems. Moscow, 1925.
- Giraffe-like Idol. First published in 2000.

== Sources ==
- Timoshenko, Vladimir (2003). Энциклопедия Таганрог [Encyclopedia of Taganrog] (in Russian). Rostov-on-Don: Rostizdat. ISBN 5-7509-0662-0.
