= Fairer-than-a-Fairy (Mailly) =

Literary fairy tale

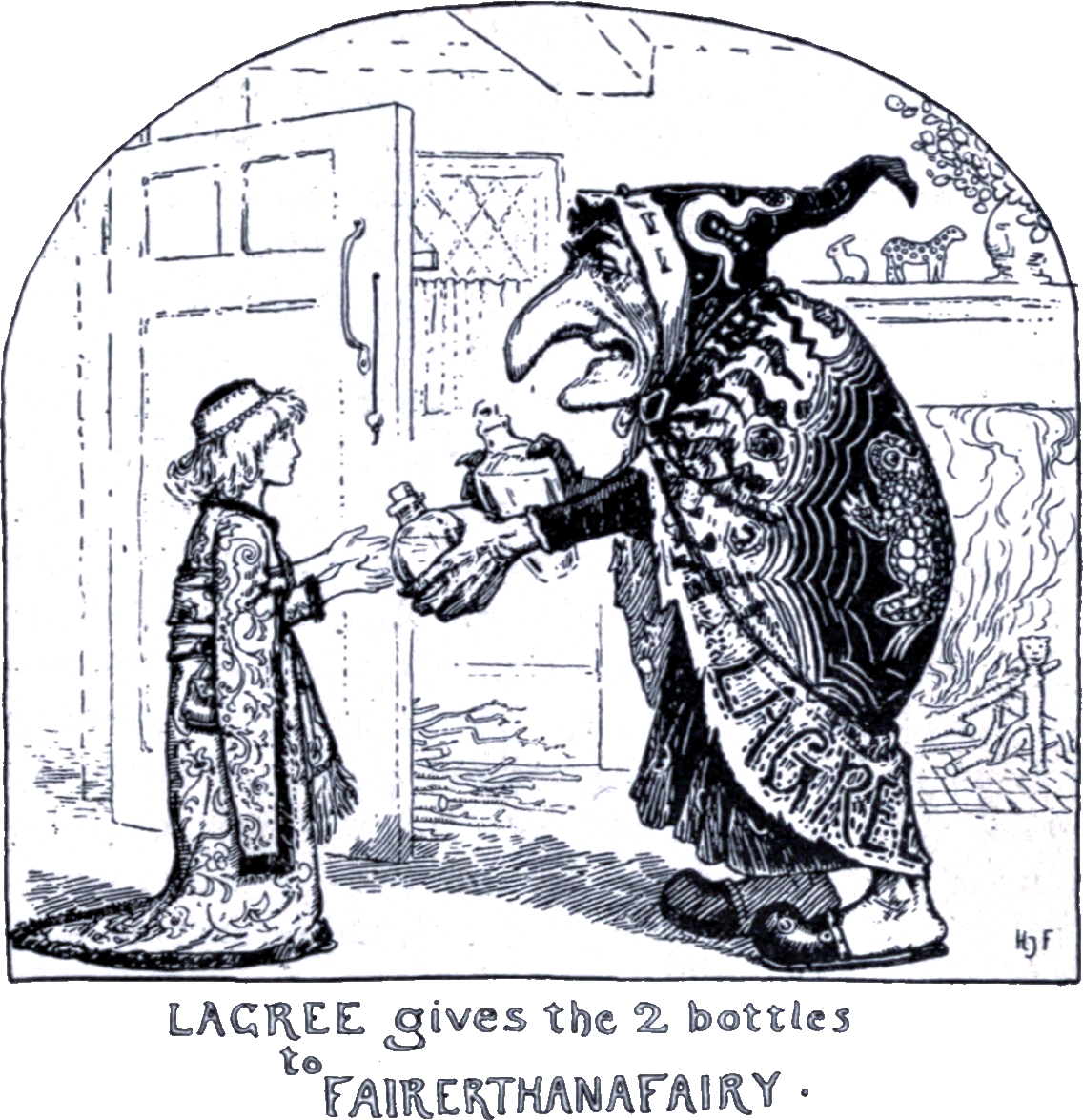
The Yellow Fairy Book illustration

Fairer-than-a-Fairy (French: Le Prince Arc-en-ciel, English: "The Rainbow Prince") is a literary fairy tale published anonymously in the 1718 fairy tale collection Nouveaux contes de fées. It is attributed to the Chevalier de Mailly. Andrew Lang included it in The Yellow Fairy Book.

== Sources ==
The tale appeared in print in Recueil des Contes des Fées, published in Geneva, in 1718, as its fifth story. The tale was also translated as The Rainbow Prince in an anonymous 1845 publication.

== Synopsis ==
After many childless years, a king had a daughter so beautiful that he named her "Fairer-than-a-Fairy". This enraged the fairies, who resolved to kidnap her. They entrusted this to the oldest fairy, Lagrée, who had only one eye and one tooth left and could preserve those only by soaking them in a magical liquid at night. She kidnapped the seven-year-old princess, whose cat and dog followed her, and brought her to a castle, where she had a pretty room but was charged to never let a fire go out and to take care of two glass bottles.

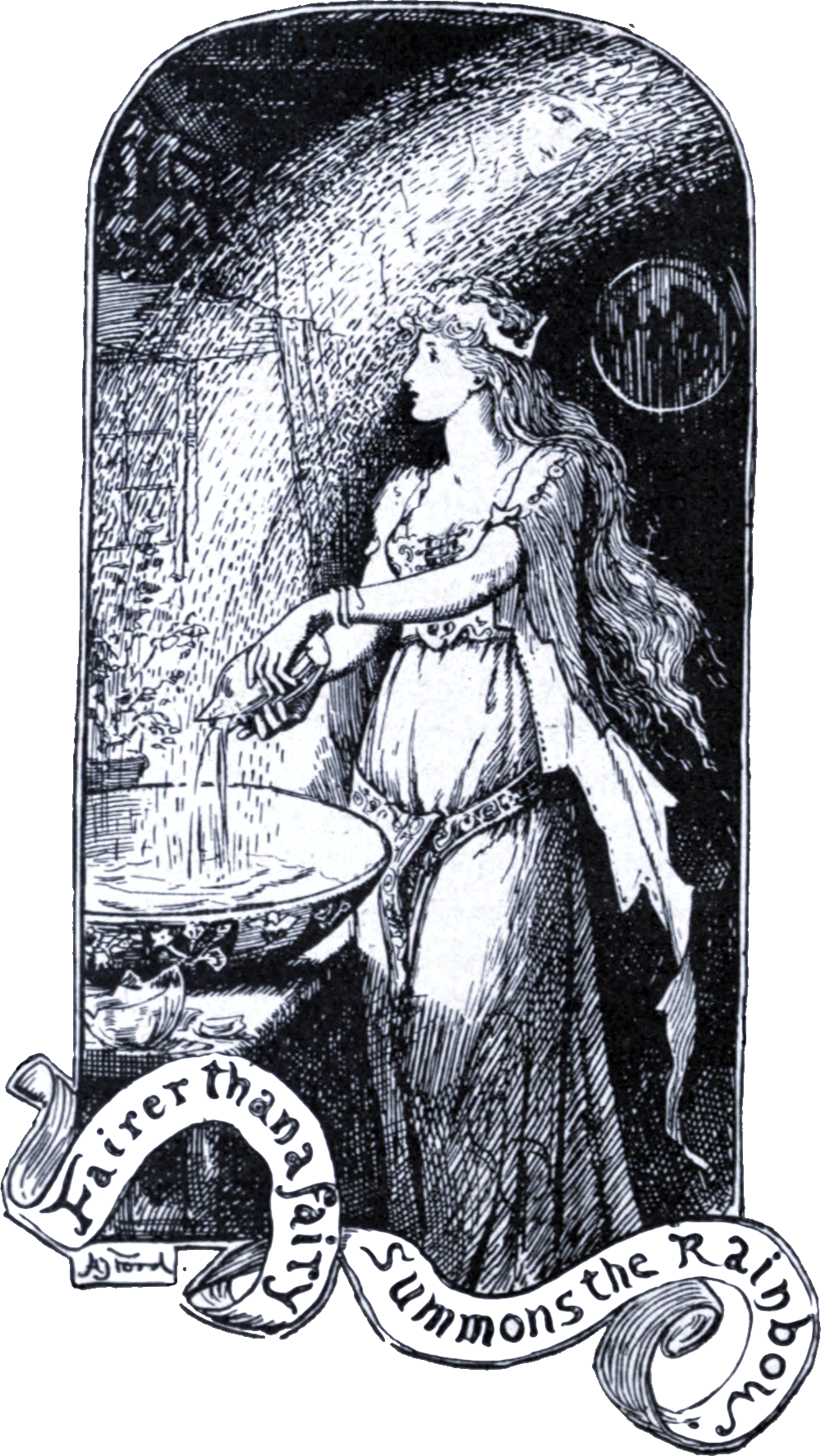
Princess Fairer-than-a-Fairy summons the rainbow. Illustration from The Yellow Fairy Book (1894).

One day, while she wandered in the garden, sunlight struck a fountain, and she heard a voice telling her that he was a prince held prisoner here, and he had fallen in love with her; he could speak only in the form of a rainbow, when sunlight shone on that fountain. They talked when they could, which one day led to her allowing the fire to go out. Lagrée, delighted, ordered Fairer-than-a-Fairy to get a new fire from Locrinos, a cruel monster that ate whoever it found, especially young girls. On the way, a bird told her to pick up a shining pebble, and she did. She reached Locrinos's house; only his wife was home, and she was impressed by her manners and beauty, and still more by the stone, and so she gave her the fire and another stone.

The princess was able to meet her lover again, and they devised a way, by putting a crystal bowl on her windowsill, that they could meet more readily. One day, the prince appeared, woeful; he had just learned that his prison was to be changed. The next day, it was cloudy all day until the very end. In her haste to reach him, Fairer-than-a-Fairy upset the bowl. Rather than lose the chance to speak with him, she filled it with the water from the two bottles. Then she set out with her dog and cat, a sprig of myrtle, and the stone Locrinos's wife had given her. Lagrée followed her. When Fairer-than-a-Fairy slept in the shelter that the stone made, Lagrée caught up, but the dog bit her, making her fall and break her last tooth. While she raged, Fairer-than-a-Fairy escaped and went on. She slept under a myrtle that sprang up from the sprig, and when Lagrée reached her, the cat scratched her eye out, making the fairy helpless against her.

Fairer-than-a-Fairy went on. Each night, for three nights, she found a green and white house, where a woman in green and white gave her a nut, a golden pomegranate, and a crystal smelling-bottle, to open at her greatest need. After that, she came to a silver castle, without doors or windows, suspended by silver chains from trees. She wanted to get into it and cracked the nut. She found in it a tiny hall porter, with a key. She climbed one of the chains and the porter let her in a secret door. She found the Rainbow Prince there, asleep. She told her story, twenty times, loudly, without waking him. She opened the pomegranate, where violins flew out of the seeds and began to play, waking him, but not entirely. Fairer-than-a-Fairy opened the bottle, where a siren flew out and told him his lady's story, rousing him. The castle walls opened up, and a court assembled about them, with the prince's mother, who informed him that his father was dead and he was now king. The three green and white ladies appeared and revealed Fairer-than-a-Fairy's royal birth. The prince and she married.

== Analysis ==
Rachel Harriette Busk noted that the tale contained the episode of the disappearance of the prince and the princess's quest for him. On her way, she is aided by three white and green old women who give her three objects that will serve to awaken the prince, whenever she finds him again.

Stanislao Prato listed Prince Arc-en-Ciel, by MMe. d'Aulnoy as one variant on the theme of the Animal as Bridegroom and, by extension, the myth of Cupid and Psyche. He also commented on the motif of the gifts of the three old ladies, and compared it to other tales wherein the human maiden is given three nuts that produce magical objects she trades for three nights with her husband.

According to Hans-Jörg Uther, the main feature of tale type ATU 425A, "The Animal (Monster) as Bridegroom" is "bribing the false bride for three nights with the husband". In fact, when he developed his revision of Aarne-Thompson's system, Uther remarked that an "essential" trait of the tale type ATU 425A was the "wife's quest and gifts" and "nights bought".

== See also ==
- Fairer-than-a-Fairy (Caumont de La Force)
- Vasilissa the Beautiful
- East of the Sun and West of the Moon
- The Feather of Finist the Falcon
- The Singing, Springing Lark
