= Yelizaveta Tarakhovskaya =

Russian poet, playwright and translator

Yelizaveta Yakovlevna Tarakhovskaya
- Born: 26 July 1891; Taganrog, Russian Empire
- Died: 11 November 1968 (aged 77); Moscow, USSR
- Occupation: Poet
- Writing career
- Period: 1925-1968
- Genre: children books
- Notable work: play By the Pike's Wish

Yelizaveta Yakovlevna Tarakhovskaya (Russian: Елизаве́та Я́ковлевна Тарахо́вская; 1891–1968) was a Russian poet, playwright, translator, and author of children's books. She is most known for her play By the Pike's Wish (1936).

== Biography ==
Yelizaveta Tarakhovskaya (born Parnokh) was born in the city of Taganrog on 26 July 1891 in a pharmacist's family. She was sister to poet Sophia Parnok and twin sister to founder of Soviet Russian jazz Valentin Parnakh. She graduated from the Taganrog Girls Gymnasium, later studied in Bestuzhev courses in Saint Petersburg and started to write poems in her childhood.

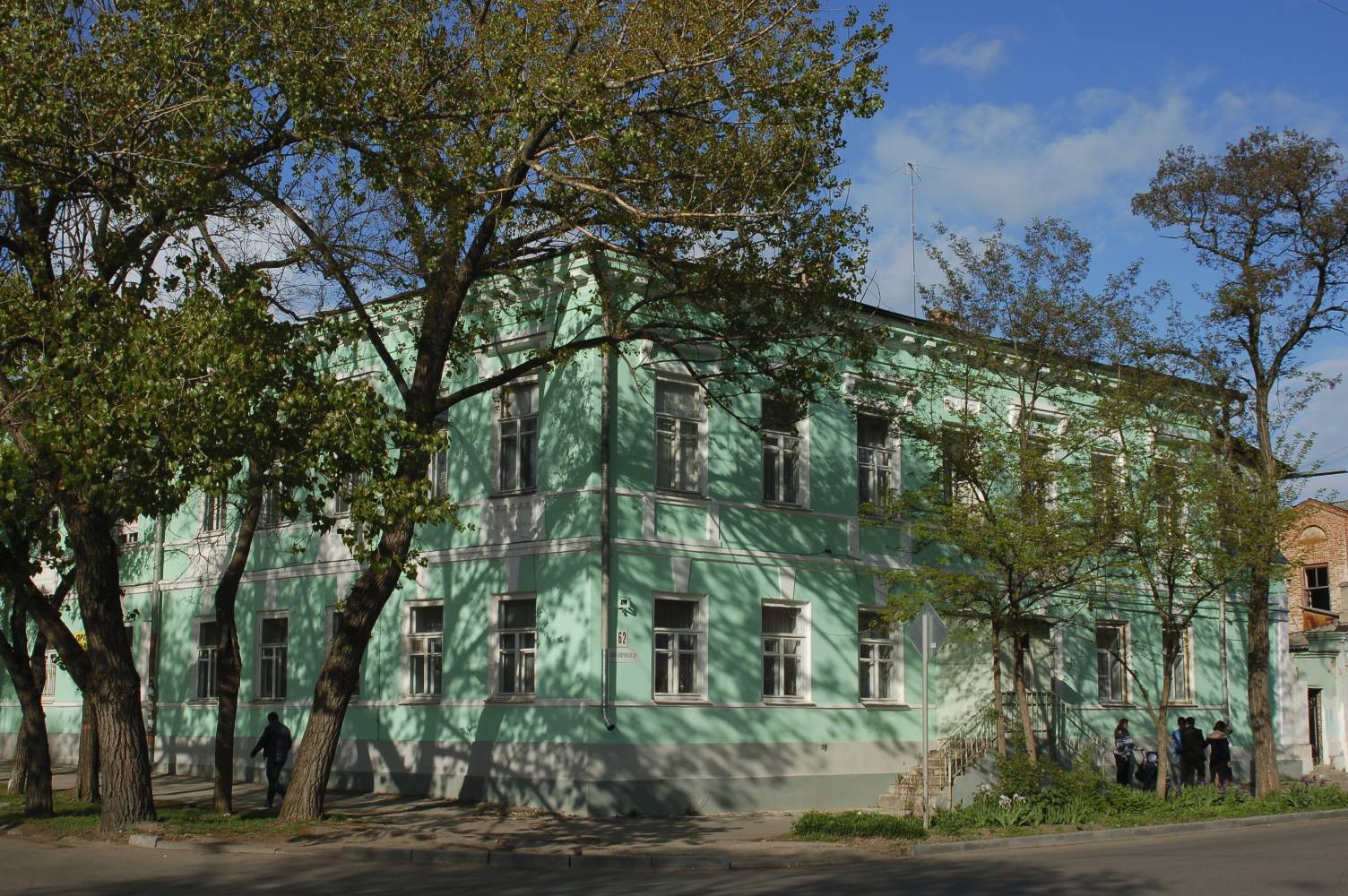
Birthhouse of Parnokhs in Taganrog.

In 1925, her first books were published: On How Chocolate Came to MosSelProm and Tit Will Fly. Since then, she wrote many children's books, including Metropolitan (1932), The Moon and the Lazy Fellow (1933), The Seagull (1965, dedicated to Valentina Tereshkova, Soviet Russian cosmonaut, the first woman to go into space). She is the author of poems for grown-ups: The Violin Clef (1958), The Bird (1965). The verses of Tarakhovskaya are lyrical, thoughtful, and almost always full of humor, with most of them being the poetry of ordinary and everyday things around.

Yelizaveta Tarakhovskaya translated into Russian many poems for children written by various Soviet and foreign authors: verses of Polish poet Julian Tuwim, Uzbek poet Kuddus Muhammadi (Muhammadiev), Azerbaijani poet Mirvari Dilbazi, Georgian poet Mariki Baratashvili(მარიკა ბარათაშვილი), Lithuanian poet Eduardas Mieželaitis, Bulgarian poet Assen Bossev and many more.

Today Tarakhovskaya is probably most known for her play By the Pike's Wish, which was staged by Sergey Obraztsov in the Moscow State Academic Puppet Show named after Serguei Obraztsov in November 1936 and has remained in the theater's repertoire ever since. The play By the Pike's Wish (Po shchuchuyemu veleniyu) is considered by theater experts as the greatest puppet show of the 20th century, making quintessence of Meyerhold's methods. It was also released as a motion picture in 1938 (directed by Aleksandr Rou).

Yelizaveta Tarakhovskaya died in Moscow on 11 November 1968, and was buried on Novodevichy Cemetery near her twin-brother Valentin.

A memorial plaque dedicated to Parnok family was placed on the wall of their birth house in Taganrog in 2012.

== Works (alphabetical list) ==
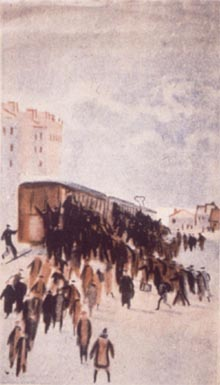
Illustration by A.Brey for Metro, 1933.

- 12 без пяти / М.: Гиз, 1930.
- Бей в барабан! / М.: Мол. гвардия, 1932.
- Бей в барабан! / М.: Гиз, 1930.
- Бей в барабан! / Изд. 3-е. М.: Мол. гвардия, 1930.
- Воздушный парад / М.; Л.: Детиздат, 1937.
- Где овечка без хвоста? / М.; Л.: Гиз, 1930.
- Дружба /Ташкент: Госиздат Уз. ССР, 1942.
- Железная дорога / М.: Г. Ф. Мириманов, 1928.
- Калитка в сад / М.; Л.: Детгиз, 1949.
- Колокол в море / М.: Гиз, 1930.
- Костя, клоп и микроскоп / Л.: Радуга, 1929.
- Метро / М.: Детгиз, 1951.
- Метро. Изд. 3-е. М.; Л.: Детиздат, 1938.
- Метрополитен / М.: Детгиз, 1935.
- Метрополитен / Изд. 2-е. М.: Детиздат, 1936.
- Метрополитен / М.: Мол. гвардия, 1932.
- Новый дом / Изд. 2-е. М.; Л.: Мол. гвардия, 1931.
- Новый дом / 1928.
- Новый дом / М.; Л.: Гиз, 1930.
- О том, как приехал шоколад в Моссельпром /Рязань: Изд. "Друзья детей", 1925.
- Огород / 1928.
- Радиобригада / М.: Гиз, 1930.
- Радиобригада / Изд. 2-е. М.; Л.: Мол. гвардия, 1931.
- Сказка про живую воду / М.; Л.: Детгиз, 1953.
- Солнечные часы / М.; Л.: Детгиз, 1947.
- Солнечные часы / Ставрополь: Ставроп. правда, 1947.
- Стальные ребята / М.: Гиз, 1929.
- Стихи / М.; Л.: Детгиз, 1951.
- Стихи и сказки / М.: Детгиз, 1954.
- Тит полетит / М.: ЗИФ, 1925.
- У Черного моря / М.: Гиз, 1928.
- Универмаг / М.: Гиз, 1930.
