= Tsar Gorokh =

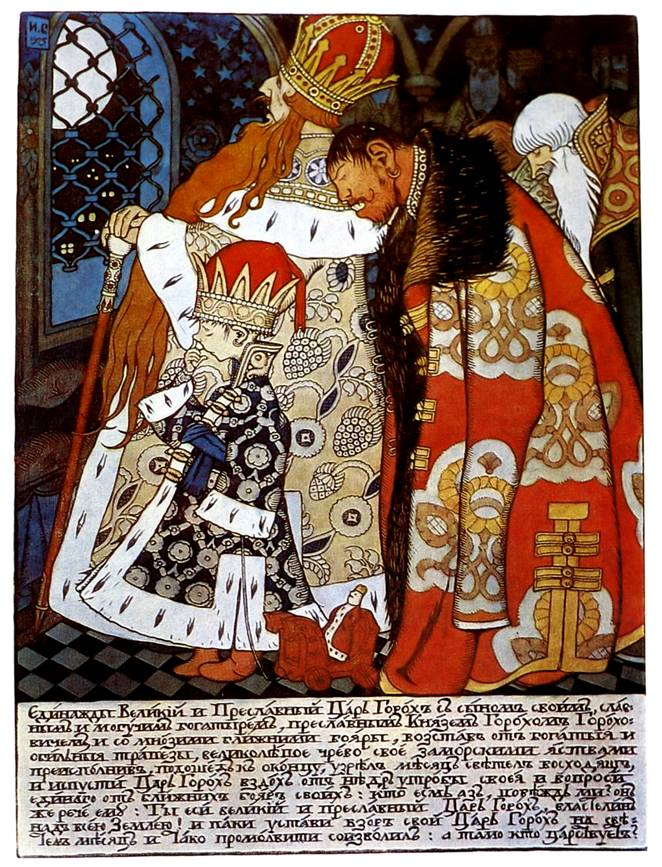
Depiction by Ivan Bilibin.

Tsar Gorokh (Russian: Царь Горох) is a character from Russian folklore, a fictional tsar whose name literally means "pea". The exact origin of the name is unknown.

== Expression ==
The name "Tsar Gorokh" appears in a number of Russian-language expressions as a reference to times immemorial, as in "during the times of Tsar Gorokh". Some preambles of Russian fairy tales set their scene in this way. In common speech the reference often conveys an ironical sense, as an indication of unbelievable or obsolete circumstances. Dostoevsky references Tsar Gorokh in the opening pages of Crime and Punishment to indicate Raskolnikov's perturbed thoughts.

== Actual character ==
There are a number of narratives, folklore and literary, where Tsar Gorokh is an actual character, rather than a time frame reference.

- War of Mushrooms: a folk fairy tale, mostly known in the literary redaction of Alexey Tolstoy
- Tsar Gorokh: an ironic poem by Pyotr Vyazemsky (1792-1878)
- A Fairy Tale about Glorious Tsar Gorokh: Dmitry Mamin-Sibiryak
