= History of Taganrog =

History of Russian city

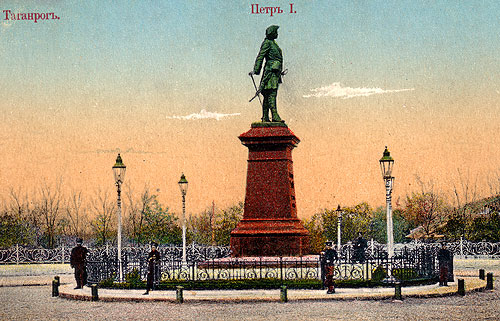
The Peter the Great Monument in the city of Taganrog on a 19th-century postcard.

The southern Russian city of Taganrog began as one of Russia's first planned cities under Peter the Great. To protect the newly conquered Sea of Azov region, the Russians opened a naval base there in 1698 and a city and seaport were built. However, after the Turkish victory in the war of 1710–1711, Taganrog city and port were demolished prior to handover to the Turks.

After further conflicts the place finally became part of Russia under Catherine the Great following the Russo-Turkish War of 1768–74. The re-founded city was populated by Greek colonists. The oldest extant church in the city, St. Nicholas Church, was built in 1778 and the Bell of Chersonesos was originally cast for it. Much further development took place under the city governor Balthasar von Campenhausen in the early 19th century. Tsar Alexander I had a palace in the city and died there in 1825.

Historical affiliations

Tsardom of Russia 1698–1712
Ottoman Empire 1712–1769
Russian Empire 1769–1917
Russian Republic 1917–1918
Donetsk–Krivoy Rog Soviet Republic 1918
Ukrainian Soviet Republic 1918 (capital city)
Don Republic 1918–1919
Ukrainian Soviet Socialist Republic 1920–1922
Soviet Union 1922–1941
∟ Ukrainian SSR 1922–1924
∟ Russian SFSR 1924–1941
Nazi Germany 1941–1943 (occupation)
Soviet Union 1943–1991
∟ Russian SFSR 1943–1991
Russian Federation 1991–present

During the Crimean War Taganrog came under siege by the English and French in 1855, but was not captured. The playwright Nestor Kukolnik, a resident of Taganrog, had a part in the city's further development; it grew to be one of the leading industrial and commercial centres of Southern Russia, while the Taganrog Theatre contributed to its cultural life.

In March–April 1918, Taganrog was the capital of the Ukrainian Soviet Republic. Taganrog was General Denikin's headquarters during the Russian Civil War. After the Soviet victory it joined Ukrainian SSR, transferring to Russian SFSR in 1924. Under German occupation in World War II between 1941 and 1943, thousands of residents, particularly Jews, were murdered by the SS (Gully of Petrushino). Through the Soviet and post-Soviet periods Taganrog has retained its importance as an industrial and technological centre.

== Ancient history ==
The excavations conducted by the German Archaeological Institute (Deutsches Archäologisches Institut) led by Ortwin Dally and Don Archaeological Society, led to the conclusion that there was a Greek settlement in the place of the modern-day Taganrog, founded in the late 7th century BC.

It played an important role in the course of the early Greek colonization of the Black Sea region, and was founded probably soon after Berezan and Histria, it is anyway much older than the first settlements and colonies in the Cimmerian Bosporus (Strait of Kerch) or Tanais that were founded between 580 and 60 BC.

=== Name of settlement ===
According to some scientists, this may be the location of the ancient town of Κρημνοί (Greek: Kremnoi) as mentioned by Herodotus (also spelled Cremna, Cremnoi, or Emporion Kremnoi). According to Herodotus, the settlement was on the coast of Palus Maeotis.

The name Crimea may also have derived from this ancient town.

== Medieval Italian colony ==
In the 13th century, the Portus Pisanus colony of the Italian Republic of Pisa was located at the site, before the Mongol invasion of Eastern Europe.

== Foundation of Taganrog ==
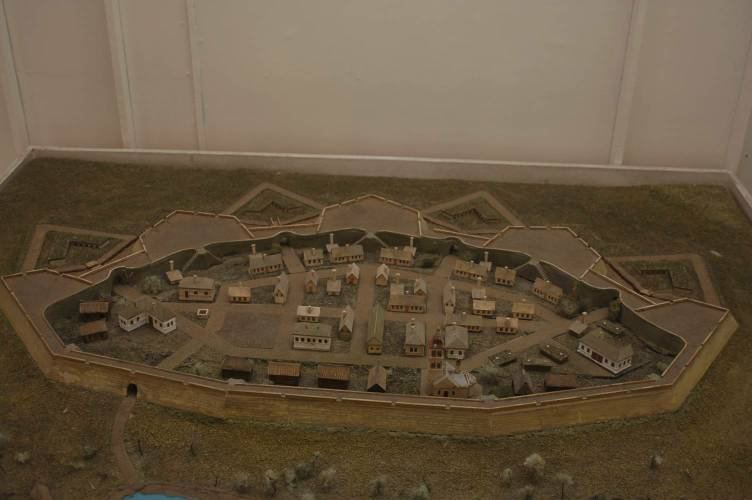
Model of the Saint Trinity fortress and seaport of Taganrog, established by the Austrian engineer Baron Ernst Friedrich von Borgsdorf. (Collection of Taganrog City Architectural Development Museum.)

Tsar Peter I of Russia tried to conquer the Turkish fortress of Azov (near the mouth of the River Don) to get access to the Sea of Azov and thus to the Black Sea. His first Azov campaign in 1695 failed, but his second attempt the next year led to victory.

To keep Azov in his possession and to hold off the Ottoman Turkish navy, the tsar gave orders to expand his small war fleet, built during the winter of 1695–1696. Peter put the Azov Flotilla under the command of Admiral Fyodor Golovin, a Russian nobleman who succeeded the Swiss François Lefort (died 1699) as Peter's military supremo, Golovin was assisted by Vice-Admiral Cornelis Cruys and by Rear-Admiral Jan van Rees.

Tsar Peter I officially founded the first Russian naval base, Taganrog (Turkish form: Taygan in Ottoman sources) on September 12, 1698. Taganrog became one of the first Russian cities built according to a detailed plan. Vice-Admiral Cornelis Cruys, who is regarded as the architect of the Russian navy, became the first mayor of Taganrog city in 1698–1702; in 1711 he produced the first maps of the Sea of Azov and of the Don River. The project for planning and building works in the city was established in 1698, based on the instructions provided by the tsar.

== City development in the 18th century ==
In 1704 the ploughing of virgin lands started. Next year were planted the imperial vineyard and orchards. The building and construction of the seaport, fortress and town were generally completed by the end of the first decade of the 18th century. The seaport of Taganrog represented an irregular water surface of some 774,000 square meters; it was the first artificial seaport in Russia. Boyar Aleksei Shein was in charge for construction of the haven. The pentagonal fortress was erected on the Cape. Inside the fortress were built stone living-quarters for soldiers and civil population.

By the middle of 1711, according to the information of Mandating Chamber of Taganrog, there were over 8000 inhabitants in Taganrog. As the development of the social life in the region progressed, Taganrog retained its military and administrative significance and gradually became the handicraft and commerce center.

In 1700–1711, the Azov Sea Navy was the guardian of Russia's Southern frontiers. But in 1710 Turkey unleashed a new war against Russia. Russian troops commanded by Boris Sheremetev were surrounded by superior Turkish forces near Prut River.

The Russian tsar had to sign Treaty of the Pruth returning Azov to Turkey and destroying Taganrog. On September 19, 1711 by the order of Peter the Great, Taganrog was demolished and in February 1712 Russian troops left the town.

For fifty years the seaport, fortress and town laid in ruins.

== Taganrog begins again ==
The Turks recaptured it twice (1712 and 1739), but it was taken by the Russians in 1769 and definitively ceded by Turkey in the Treaty of Kuchuk Kainarji (1774).

On April 2, 1769 Russian troops entered Taganrog. The city was refounded by Catherine the Great, who issued a decree addressed to the Vice-Admiral Aleksey Senyavin.

Taganrog was populated by Greek colonists who, like the Greeks of classical times, took refuge from poverty or tyranny in townships around the northern Black Sea and the Sea of Azov.

Some Greeks had been Mediterranean pirates and were now tycoons; many lived by cheating Russian farmers and bribing Russian customs officials. They spread wealth, not only by conspicuous consumption, but by generous civic arts, founding orchestras, clubs, schools and churches, bringing in French chefs and importing Italian sculptors.

Ioannis Varvakis and Achilles Alferaki are the most famous Greeks of Taganrog.

== The bell of Chersonesos ==
The bell of Chersonesos or "the fog bell of Chersonesos" is considered by many as "one of Taganrog's sights located abroad", which even became a symbol of another city – Sevastopol or to be more exact, the symbol of Chersonesos Taurica.

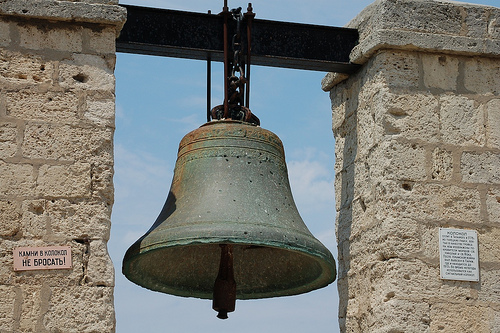
The bell of Chersonesos.

The fog bell was cast in 1778 from the trophy Turkish cannons seized by the Russian Imperial Army during Russo-Turkish War (1768–1774). The bell features depictions of patron saints of sailors: Saint Nicholas and Saint Phocas and the following phrase can still be read today in Russian: «Сей колокол вылит в Святого Николая Чудотворца в Таганро... из пленен Турецкой артиллери... весом ... пуд фу (нт) 1778 месяца Августа ... числа»., which literary means "This bell was cast in the Saint Nicholas the Wonderworker Church in Taganrog from the trophy Turkish artillery...weight...pounds. Year 1778, month of August, on the date of ....".

The bell was cast before the foundation of Sevastopol for the Saint Nicholas church in Taganrog, which was the Russian Navy's military base at that time. Until 1803 the St.Nicholas Church was subordinated to the Navy ministry. After Sevastopol became main Russian navy base in the South of Russia, the Emperor Alexander I ordered the bell to be transported to Sevastopol to be fitted in the Church of St. Nicholas which was being constructed there, with other bells and church plates also given over to the city of Sevastopol.

== 19th century ==
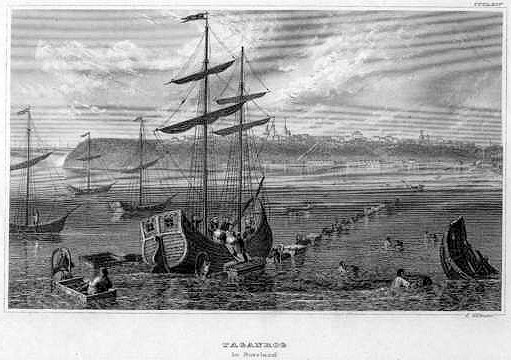
Taganrog's Harbor in the late 18th/early 19th century.

In 1802 H.M. Alexander I of Russia signed a decree establishing the city of Taganrog as a governorate (incorporated municipality with privileges given by royal charter).

In 1805, Baron Balthasar von Campenhausen was appointed by Alexander I of Russia Governor of Taganrog and for his achievements he is still considered the best Head of Taganrog of all times.

Campenhausen achievements include:

- The Taganrog Customs district;
- The new slope to the haven;
- New stone storehouses for goods;
- The start of construction of coasting vessels for transportation of goods to other Russian ports on Black and Azov Seas;
- Inauguration of the navigation school, the commercial gymnasium and the commercial court;
- The Construction and Building Committee that planned the future city architectural development;
- Introducing oil lighting in the streets;
- Starting the paving and greening of the streets;
- In April 1806, founding the Gorky Park (Taganrog).

Two streets in Taganrog were later named after Campenhausen: Bolshoy Kampenkhauzensky (now: Komsomolsky) and Malo-Kampenkhauzensky (now: Spartakovsky).

Tsar Alexander I also left his mark on the city. He came to Taganrog for spiritual solace at the end of his reign, and settled in a modest single-storeyed palace. Soon after moving to Taganrog he died – at least, it was announced that he did. Rumors arose that he ran off to Siberia and became a holy man, and that the body of a soldier who resembled him was used in the funeral. Taganrog was briefly a shadow capital of the empire.

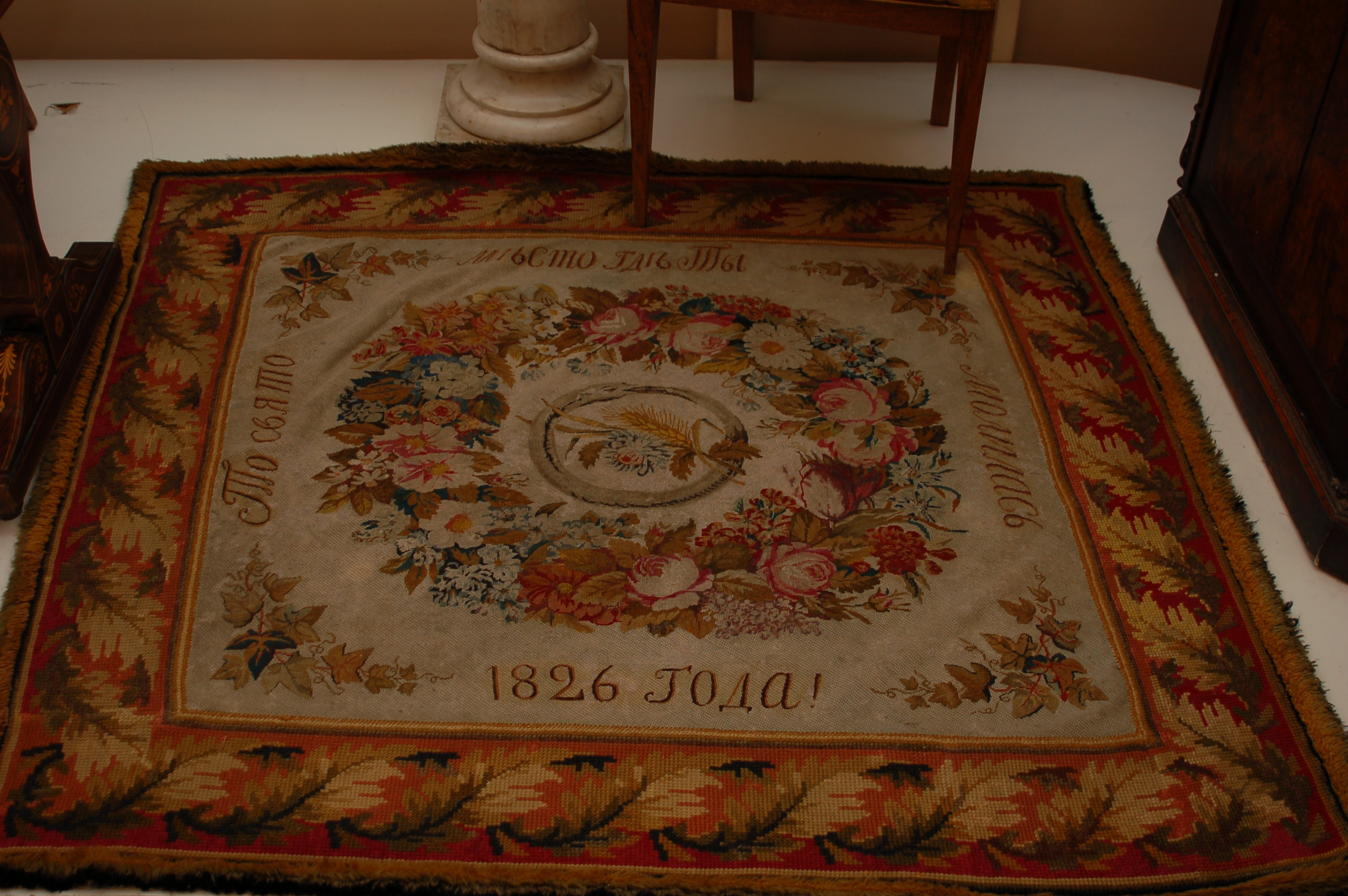
Carpet on which Elizabeth Alexeievna (Louise of Baden) stood to pray after death of Alexander I of Russia from Alexander I Palace in Taganrog. "Blessed Be the Place where You Prayed. 1826!"

in April 1833, there happened in Taganrog an important event in Italian history – though the city's inhabitants were not aware of it at the time: Giuseppe Garibaldi, who came to Taganrog as a young merchant marine captain in charge of the schooner Clorinda carrying a shipment of oranges, met fellow-Italian Giovanni Battista Cuneo in a seaport inn and was convinced to join the revolutionary movement which was to take up the rest of his life (see Garibaldi Monument in Taganrog.)

Russian playwright and poet Nestor Kukolnik who settled in Taganrog in 1857 influenced a lot the way the city and the neighboring area developed. Kukolnik was the first to prove the need of university education in the Don River region and on Azov Sea.

His offer to open a university in Taganrog was not successful, but later it proved to be an important foundation for opening the Novorossiysk University in 1865. Kukolnik also proved necessity of a newspaper in Taganrog. It was one of the reasons to open newspaper-publishing houses not only in Taganrog, but also in Odessa and Rostov-on-Don.

Since 1865 Nestor Kukolnik led the workgroup that proved necessity of a railroad line from Kharkiv to Taganrog. This work was success and Russian tsar Alexander II of Russia approved the project in 1868.

He also was the first to raise the issue of environmental protection of the Gulf of Taganrog. But the related project encountered strong resistance from regional leadership and was not realized. Nestor Kukolnik assisted in opening the county court in Taganrog, open after his death in 1869.

In 1887, the Taganrog's status as a borough (Taganrog Governorate) was annulled, and Taganrog was annexed to the Don Voisko Province. According to the "City Statute" of 1870, the City Council (Duma) was established in Taganrog for managing local development, trade, healthcare and public education.

== The siege of Taganrog in Crimean War ==
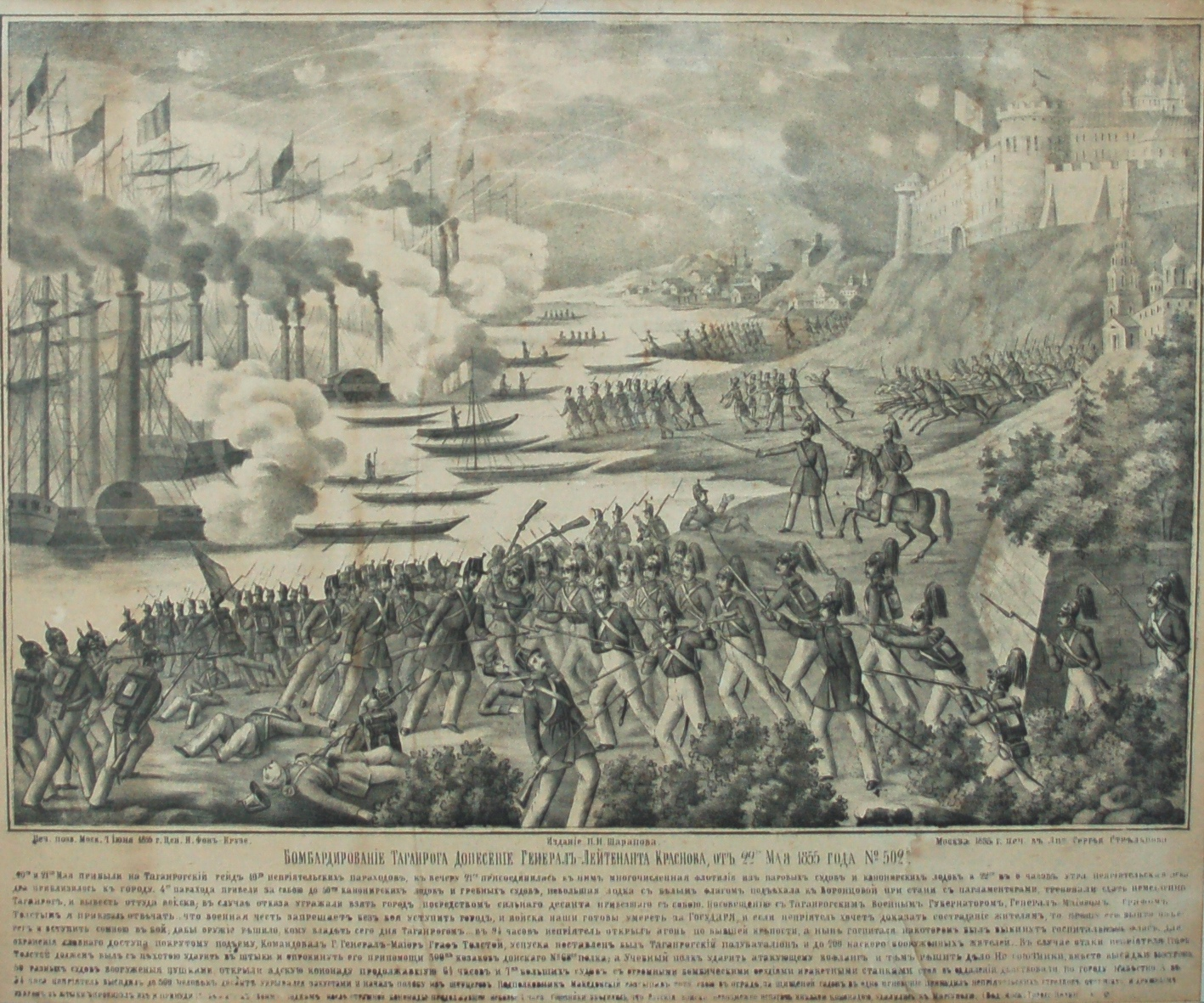
Bombardment of the city and landing of the troops during Siege of Taganrog on May 22, 1855.

In spring 1855, the allied English-French commandment decided to send an expedition corps into the Azov Sea to undermine Russian communications and supplies to besieged Sevastopol.

On May 12, 1855 English-French war ships entered the Kerch Strait and destroyed the coast battery of the Kamishevaya Bay. On May 21, 1855 the gunboats and armed steamers attacked the seaport of Taganrog, the most important hub in terms of its proximity to Rostov on Don and due to vast resources of food, especially bread, wheat, barley and rye that were amassed in the city after the outbreak of Crimean War that put an end to its exportation. The governor-general of Taganrog, Yegor Tolstoy and Lieutenant-General Ivan Krasnov refused the ultimatum, responding that Russians never surrender their cities. The English-French squadron began a bombardment of Taganrog during 6.5 hours and landed 300 troops near the Old Stone Steps in the downtown Taganrog, who were thrown back by Don Cossacks and volunteer corps.

In July 1855, the allied squadron tried to go past Taganrog to Rostov on Don, entering the Don River through the Mius River. On July 12, 1855 the H.M.S. Jasper grounded near Taganrog thanks to a fisherman, who repositioned the buoys into shallow waters. The cossacks captured the gunboat with all of its guns and blew it up. The third siege attempt was made August 19–31, 1855, but the city was already fortified and the squadron could not approach too close for landing operations. The allied fleet left the Gulf of Taganrog on September 2, 1855, with minor military operations along Azov Sea coast continuing until late fall 1855.

== Trade and economy development in the 19th century ==
The market played a key role in the city life and influenced also its appearance. From the beginning of the 19th century the city had rich private residences and social buildings. The commercial Taganrog became one of the largest industrial cities of the Russian South. By the end of the 19th century grew the number of educational institutions. During the second half of the 19th century the foreign trade turnover of Taganrog increased distinctly. Already at the beginning of the 20th century Taganrog held the second place in Russia in the importation and the sixth in the quantity of exported products. Due to dramatic developments in domestic commerce, the fairs lost their dominant role, and the stores, these 'eternal trade points' started to appear in the city. Petrovskaya Street and Gogolevski Street turned into main commercial highways of Taganrog. The foreign investments into Russian economy influenced the development of a large-scale industry in Taganrog. In 1896 with Belgian investments, started the construction of the iron-and-steel factory. The factory began to function a year later. The plant produced iron beams, railings, pipes, railway bands, iron sheets, rolled steel.

In 1896 the Belgian company Albert Neuve, Wilde & Co started the building of the boiler plant. Besides the boilers, the works produced metallurgical constructions, iron and coppery castings, although it was inferior to the steel plant in the production volume and workers quantity. The tannery, founded in 1853, passed into the hands of the Belgian experts and was distinctly enlarged then. Since the 1870 the roadwork was expanded. By the end of the century the main part of the city streets was already paved. At the same time the greenery was planted in the city center.

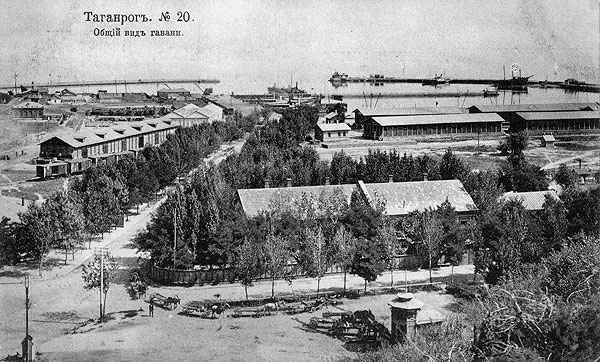
View of the Taganrog's Harbor (late 19th century postcard).

In 1866, the new city theatre building was erected by the Italian architect Londeron. Thanks to the excellent acoustics of its hall, the Taganrog Theatre gained a nationwide glory. The plays of Anton Chekhov, Maxim Gorky, A.N. Ostrovsky, William Shakespeare were performed here. The special pride of the citizens was the Italian opera, financed by the local merchants, patrons of art. Taganrog theater had its own Italian opera from 1866 to 1875. In 1876, the first City Library was opened by the governor Johan Hampus Furuhjelm. In 1898 the regional museum was founded. In 1907 the first Mirage cinema was built, a few years later the wooden building of the circus was erected. In 1871 the first private newspaper Azovski Vestnik (Azov Bulletin) was established, later renamed Taganrogski Verstnik (Taganrog Bulletin). Among the city intellectuals were artists, musicians and columnists.

Alekseevskaya Women's Gymnasium existed in Taganrog between 1911 and 1917.

== Civil war, establishment of Soviets, temporary Ukrainian Soviet capital ==
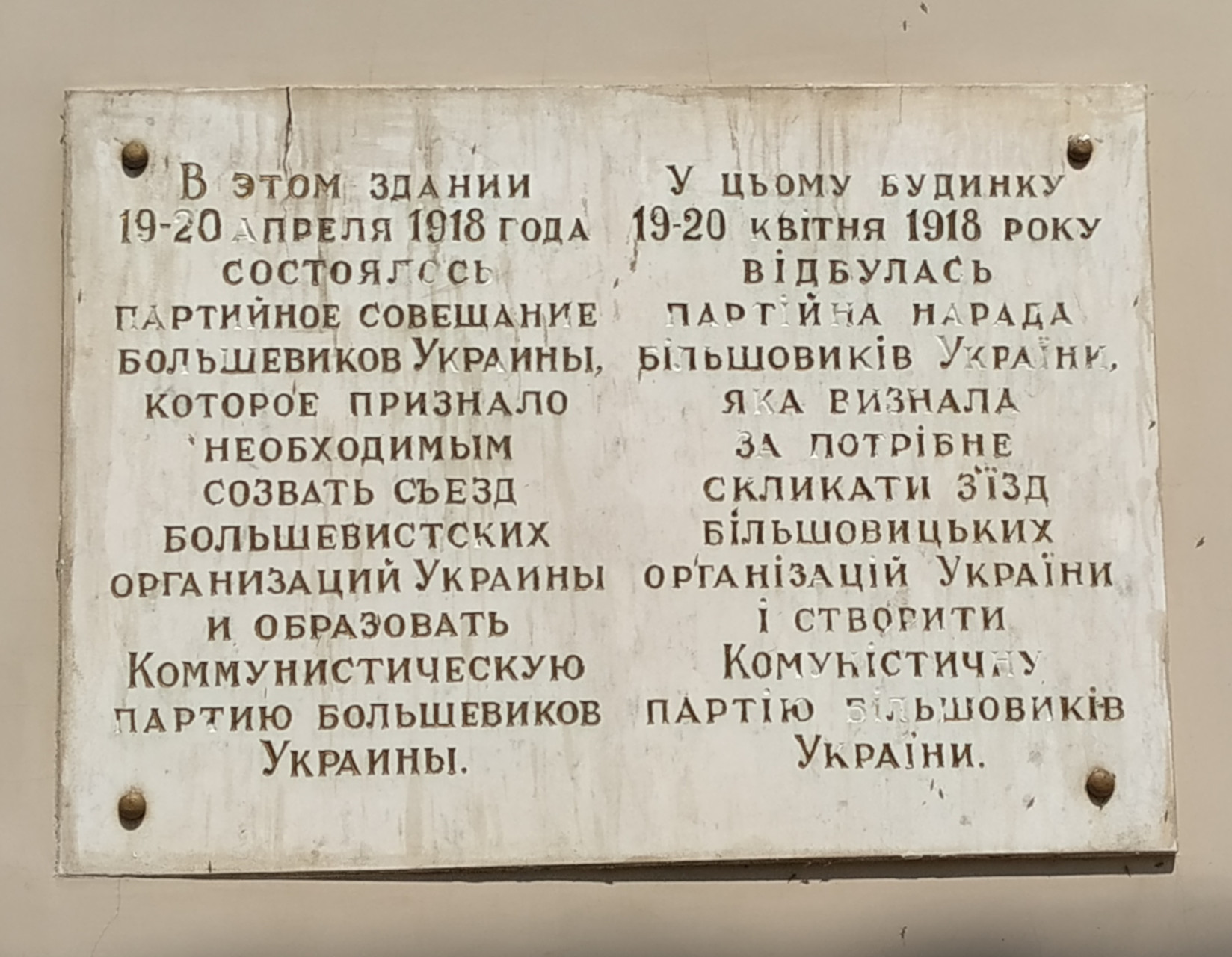
Bilingual Russian and Ukrainian plaque commemorating the foundation of the Communist Party of Ukraine in 1918 in the former Bristol Hotel

Soviet power was established in Taganrog on January 22, 1918. Anton Glushko headed the first local soviet. From March to May 1918, the government of the Ukrainian Soviet Republic stayed in Taganrog during Ukraine's occupation by German troops. The Communist Party of Ukraine was founded in the city in April 1918. Taganrog itself was under German occupation May – August 1918. In August 1918, Don Cossacks took the control of the city. In 1919 General Anton Denikin kept his headquarters at the Avgerino mansion.

Red Army troops under command of Nikolay Kuybishev entered the city on December 24, 1919. The remainder of Denikin's troops and the British Consulate were evacuated by HMS Montrose. On February 26, 1920 the Military Revolutionary Commission issued the order number 46, closing five foreign consulates that were open in Taganrog at that time (Spanish, Greek, Belgian, Danish and Swedish Consulates). The full power was given to the executive committee of The City Soviet Workers' council on December 17, 1920 and the city joined Ukrainian SSR. However, it was transferred to Russian SFSR in 1924 along with Shakhty Okrug.

== World War II ==
In World War II, 1941–1943, Taganrog was occupied by German troops and suffered extensive damage. Two SS divisions entered the city in October 1941 with other military and back divisions to follow. The local government system was replaced by Bürgermeisteramt or "New Russian local government".

The SS Einsatzgruppe Sonderkommando 10a performed systematic genocide of Taganrog citizens—particularly Jews—from the first days of occupation. According to the information of the State Archive, some 7,000 Taganrogers (1,500 of them children of various age) were shot to death in the Gully of Petrushino.

In Taganrog at least two Soviet partisans groups were active, organized by NKVD before the Soviet troops left the city; and in November 1941, Semion Morozov organized an underground resistance group, which consisted mainly of young Komsomol members. The members of the two groups acted separately and were not permitted to go into contact.

Taganrog was liberated by Soviet Army's 130th Rifle Division under command of Konstantin Sychev (ru:Сычёв, Константин Васильевич) and 416th Rifle Division under command of Dmitri Syzranov (Russian: Сызранов Дмитрий Михайлович).

Taganrog was awarded the status of City of Military Glory by the President of the Russian Federation Dmitriy Anatolyevich Medvedev on November 3, 2011, for “courage, endurance and mass heroism, exhibited by defenders of the city in the struggle for the freedom and independence of the Motherland”.

== Modern period ==
The post-revolution and postwar periods gave a new life to the city. The power machinery engineering, metallurgical production, instrument-making and other industry branches began to develop. The development of science was closely connected with the inauguration of the Taganrog State University of Radio Engineering. In the seventies and eighties, Taganrog was known as an important scientific and industrial center of Southern Russia. Taganrog companies produced: steam-boilers, self-propelled combine harvesters, drill-, casing-, oil-, gas-, and water-pipes, gears for searching fish and other installations. Taganrog products were exported to over 50 countries of the world.

The disintegration of the Soviet Union and the first economic reforms in the early nineties were very unfavorable for the citizens of Taganrog. The local government of the city and the managers of industrial enterprises made efforts to adapt to the new market economy. They managed to preserve the experienced workforce and improve technological processes. By the end of the twentieth century the production output growth rate reached nearly 400%.

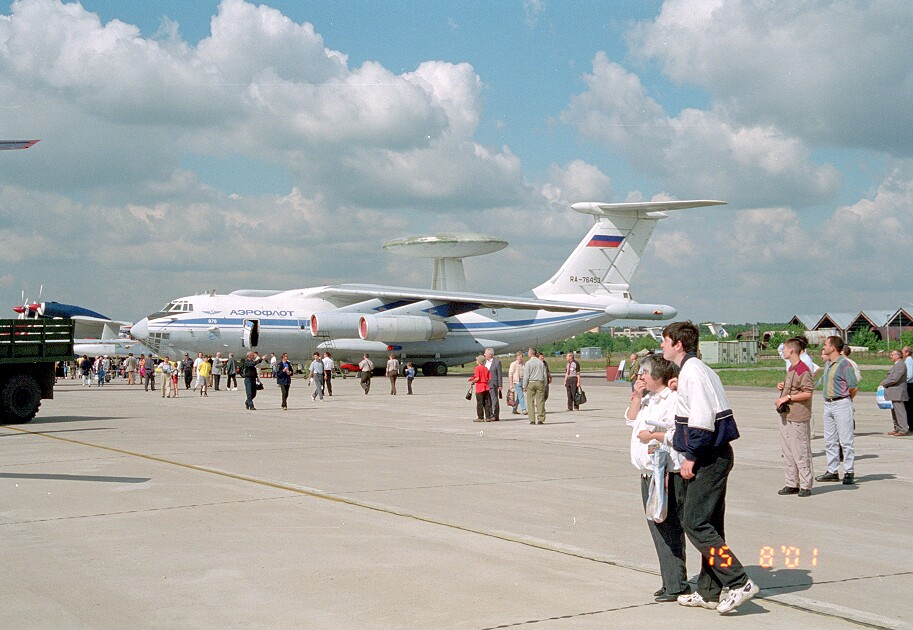
Beriev's A-50.

The multipurpose amphibian BE-200 has been designed and put into production by Beriev Aircraft Company. This amphibian aircraft has no analogues in the whole world. The TAGMET Iron & Steel Factory applies the most progressive steel casting technology and grafts on its growth rate. Doninvest Finance & Industry Group launched the production of passenger cars under licence of Citroën, France and Hyundai, South Korea. The citizens of Taganrog witnessed the inauguration of a new maternity center; a new ophthalmology department for veterans was opened in the Hospital 7. Several new trolley bus and shuttle bus routes have been introduced throughout the city. Digital phone lines have been installed in the city, and videophone communication and high-speed internet access are now widely available.

== See also ==
- Azov campaigns
- List of governors of Taganrog in 1802–1888
