= Maksutov =

Maksutov may refer to:

- Maksutov telescope, a catadioptric telescope with a meniscus corrector .
- Dmitry Dmitrievich Maksutov (1896–1964), Russian optical engineer, inventor of the Maksutov telescope
- Maksutov (crater), a lunar crater named after Dmitry Dmitrievich Maksutov
- 2568 Maksutov, a main-belt asteroid named after Dmitry Dmitrievich Maksutov

== See also ==
- Maksutov (surname)
