= Dmitry Maksutov =

Dmitry Maksutov may refer to:

- Dmitry Petrovich Maksutov (1832-1889), Imperial Russian Navy counter-admiral, prince, 14th and the last Governor of Russian America
- Dmitri Dmitrievich Maksutov (1896-1964), Soviet/Russian optician and astronomer; grandson of Dmitri Petrovich Maksutov
- Dmitri Dmitrievich Maksutov (polar explorer) (1896-), Soviet icebreaker-builder and Antarctic explorer
