= Ippolit Vogak =

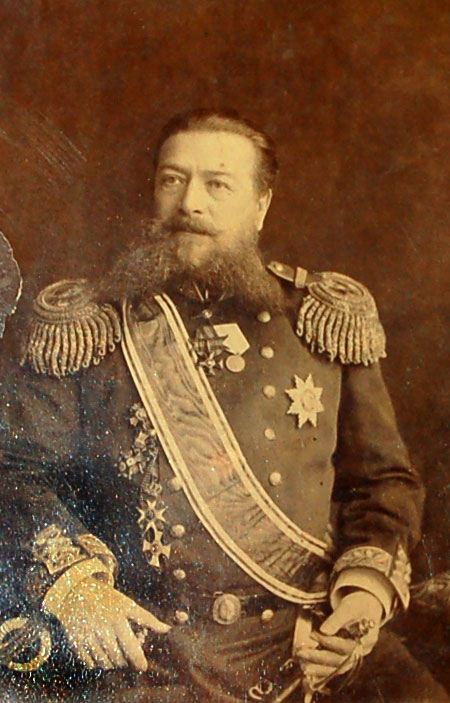
Ippolit Vogak

Ippolit Konstantinovich Vogak (sometimes spelled Wogack, Russian: Вогак, Ипполит Константинович, 30 August 1829 – 16 July 1889) was an Imperial Russian Navy admiral and the 17th and last governor of Taganrog.

== Biography ==
Vogak graduated from Cadet Corps in 1847, served in the Baltic Fleet, and was a participant of the Crimean War. He was promoted to the rank of captain-lieutenant in 1862, captain second rank in 1870, and captain first rank in 1873. He was then promoted to the rank of rear-admiral in 1883.

Vogak commanded the battleships Novgorod and Petr Velikiy in 1874-1880, as well as imperial yacht of the House of Romanov Livadia. He was a junior flag-officer (младший флагман) of the Black Sea Fleet in 1884-1885 and junior flag-officer of the Baltic Fleet in 1887-1889.

From 1885 to 1887, he served as Governor of Taganrog.

Vogak died on 16 July 1889 in Saint Petersburg and was buried at the Smolenskoe Lutheran Cemetery.

Government offices
Preceded by Pavel Zelenoy	Governors of Taganrog; 1885–1887	Succeeded by Mayor Achilles Alferaki
