= Maksutov (surname) =

Maksutov (Russian: Максутов) is a Russian masculine surname, its feminine counterpart is Maksutova. It may refer to

- Dmitri Dmitrievich Maksutov (1896–1964), Russian optician and astronomer
- Dmitri Petrovich Maksutov (1832–1889), Imperial Russian Navy rear-admiral and last Governor of Russian America
- Pavel Maksutov (1825–1882), Imperial Russian Navy rear-admiral, prince, hero of Crimean War and 15th governor of Taganrog
