= Alexander Lieven =

Alexander Lieven may refer to:

- Alexander Karlovich Lieven (1801–1880), General in the Imperial Russian Army and Governor of Taganrog
- Alexander Alexanderovich Lieven (1860–1914), Admiral in the Imperial Russian Navy
- Alexander Pavlovich Lieven (1919–1988)
