= All Saints' Church (Taganrog) =

Church in Taganrog, Russia

Coordinates: 47.1228°N 38.5409°E

Religion
- Affiliation: Russian Orthodox

Location
- Location: Taganrog, Rostov Oblast, Russia
- Interactive map of All Saints' Church

Architecture
- Completed: 1824

All Saints' Church (Russian: Церковь Всех Святых) is a Russian Orthodox church in the city of Taganrog, Rostov Oblast, Russia. It belongs to the Diocese of Rostov and Novocherkassk of Moscow Patriarchate and was built in 1824.

== History ==
The All Saints' Church was founded in 1810. Construction works continued for a long time and were completed only in 1824. Just after that the church was consecrated and attributed to the Assumption Cathedral, which was the main church in the city and was demolished in 1938. In 1837, the church was rebuilt in the form that currently exists today.

In 1922, the church was closed and looted, although it turned out to be the only one of the 25 religious buildings of the city, which had kept its original form and had not been destroyed during the Soviet era. During World War II, when the city was occupied by Wehrmacht forces, it was opened again.

There are several graves in the church's crypt. Particularly, there lies the ashes of Lev Yakovlevich Kulchitsky, a Rear Admiral and 13th Mayor of Taganrog.
