= Mikhail Lavrov =

Russian admiral

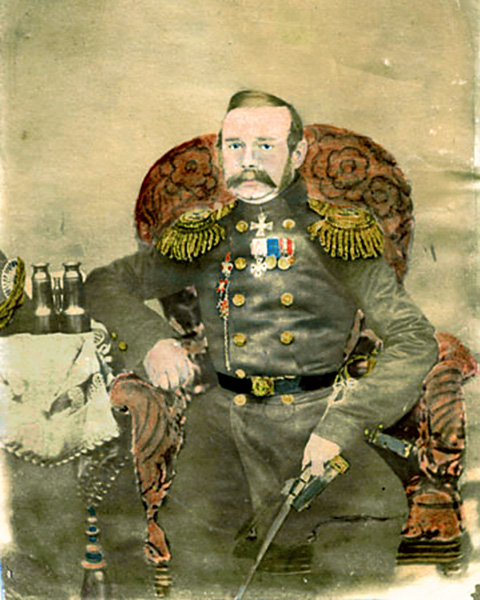
Admiral Mikhail Lavrov

Mikhail Andrianovich Lavrov (Russian: Михаил Андрианович Лавров; 1799–1882) was a Russian rear-admiral and Arctic explorer.

Mikhail Lavrov was born on 13 September 1799 in the city of Arkhangelsk. He graduated from Cadets Corps in Saint Petersburg and served at the Baltic Fleet. He participated in the voyage of the cargo ship Mezen from Kronstadt to Arkhangelsk and back in 1819–1820. In 1821–1824, in the rank of senior officer, he participated in the expedition of Fyodor Litke on board of the brig Novaya Zemlya, making description of coast line of Murmansk and Novaya Zemlya archipelago. In 1825–1827, he made a round-the-world voyage on board sloop Krotkiy with Admiral Ferdinand Wrangel, visiting Kamchatka and Russian America. In 1831–1834, Lavrov served in the rank of lieutenant commander in the Mediterranean and Adriatic, participated in a battle against pirate ships, sinking four of them, and was therefore promoted to the rank of commander. In 1833, he was awarded with an Order of St. George of the 4th degree for immaculate service in the officer rank in 18 six-month campaigns.

In 1846, during exercises in the Baltic Sea on board battleship Gangut, Captain Lavrov refused to obey an admiral's order and was to reduced to the rank of sailor by Tsar Nicholas I. In 1850 he was given back his captain's rank and resigned. Alexander II of Russia gave Mikhail Lavrov the opportunity to serve again in the Russian Navy in 1855, and he was promoted to the rank of rear-admiral for the feat of arms.

In 1857–1864, Mikhail Lavrov was governor of the city of Taganrog, where he initiated opening the steamboat line Taganrog–Constantinople.

In 1872, Lavrov was promoted to the admiral's rank and served at the reserve fleet.

A cape to the south of Melkiy Bay in the Arctic, an island the Vladivostok Bay and another island off the NE shores of Bolshevik Island in Severnaya Zemlya were named after Admiral Lavrov.

== External links and references ==
- Русский биографический словарь: В 25 т. / под наблюдением А. А. Половцова. 1896–1918.
- «Энциклопедия Таганрога». — Ростов-на-Дону: Ростиздат, 2003. — ISBN 5-7509-0662-0
- Историко-литературный альманах "Вехи Таганрога", Сентябрь 2008 г., Таганрог

Government offices
Preceded by Yegor Tolstoy	Governors of Taganrog; 1857–1864	Succeeded by Pavel Pereleshin
