= Governor of Taganrog =

Government office, 1802–1887

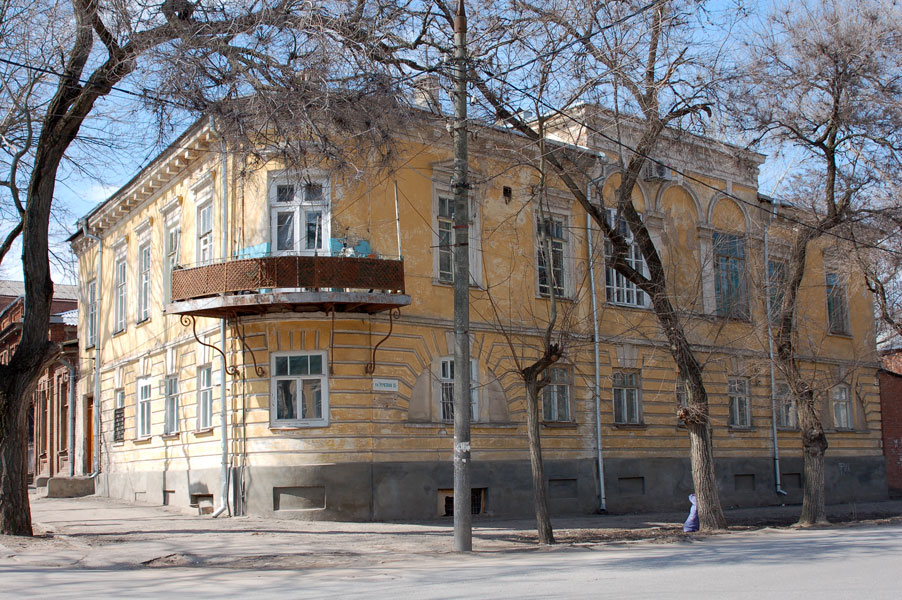
This historic building once housed the Taganrog city hall

The Governor of Taganrog (Russian: Таганрогское градоначальство) was the head of the Taganrog borough or governorate (incorporated municipality with privileges given by royal charter), between October 8, 1802 and May 19, 1887.

Taganrog was also the center of uezd (including the cities of Rostov on Don, Nakhichevan on Don and Mariupol) from 1816 to 1834. Rostov was subordinated to Yekaterinoslav Governorate in 1834, while Nakhichevan and Mariupol remained within Taganrog's governorate until 1859.

== Historical background ==
By the end of the 18th century, Taganrog lost its importance as a military base with Crimea and Azov Sea being under command of Imperial Russia. The cities on Black Sea and Azov Sea transformed into important trade centers. The trade development demanded new measures and Alexander I of Russia introduced the office of governors (градоначальник) who were in direct contact with him. The governorships (in different periods of time) were introduced in four Russian cities: Odessa, Taganrog, Feodosiya and Kerch. The emperor appointed to this post dynamic people with initiative. The post co-existed with the Head of the City or mayor (Russian: городской голова) and helped to develop trade and raise well-being of its citizens.

== List of governors of Taganrog ==
- Apollon Dashkov (1802–1805)
- Baron Balthasar von Campenhausen (1805–1809)
- Pyotr Papkov (1810–1822)
- Nikolai Naumov (1822–1825)
- Alexander Dunaev (1825–1832)
- Baron Otto Pfeilizer-Frank (1832–1843)
- Prince Alexander Lieven (1844–1853)
- Count Nikolai Adlerberg (1853–1854)
- Count Yegor Tolstoy (1854–1856)
- Admiral Mikhail Lavrov (1856–1864)
- Admiral Pavel Pereleshin (1864–1866)
- Admiral Ivan Shestakov (1866–1868)
- Admiral Lev Kultshitskiy (1868–1873)
- Mayor Akhilles Alferaki as temporary governor from November 25, 1873 to December 31, 1873
- Admiral Ivan Furugelm (Johan Hampus Furuhjelm) (1874–1876)
- Rear-admiral Pavel Maksutov (1876–1882)
- Rear-admiral Pavel Zelenoy (1882–1885)
- Rear-admiral Ippolit Vogak (1885–1887)

== Portraits of Taganrog governors ==
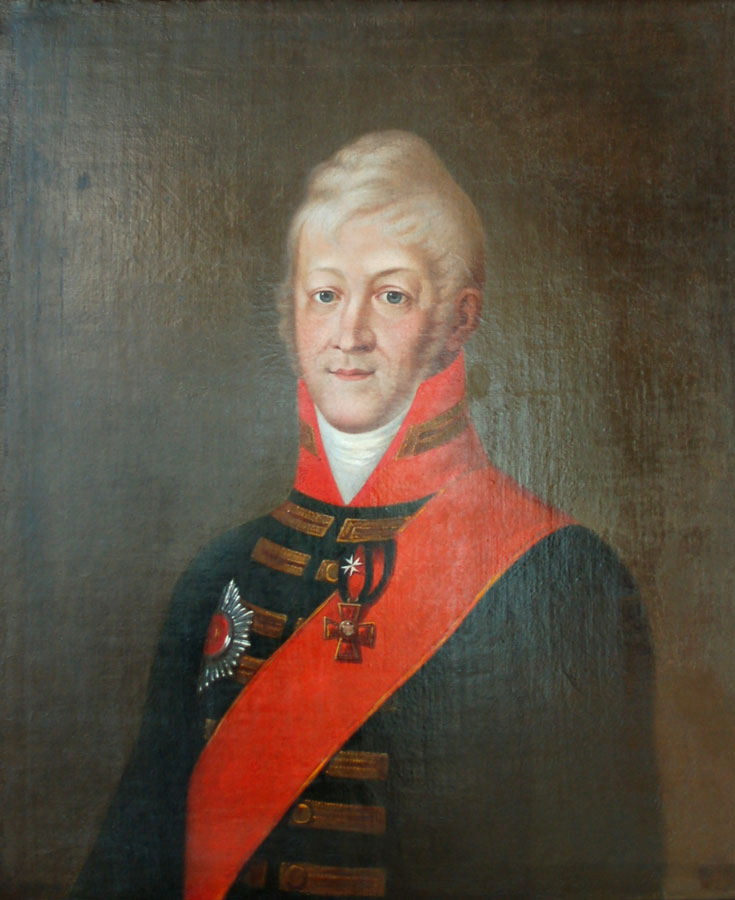
Balthasar von Campenhausen

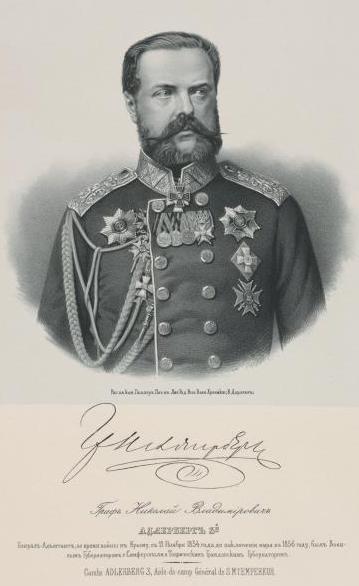
Nikolai Adlerberg

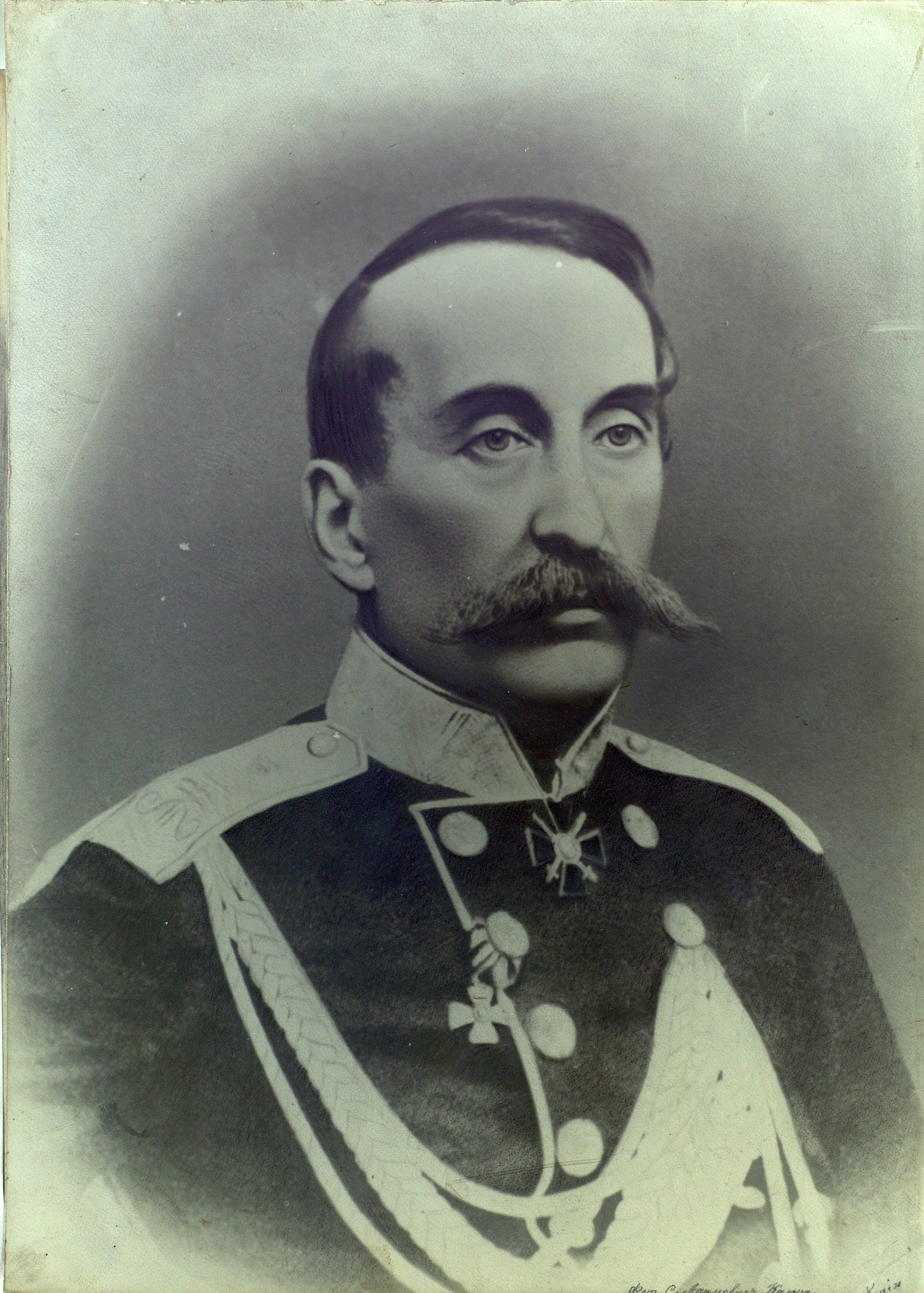
Governor-general Yegor Tolstoy

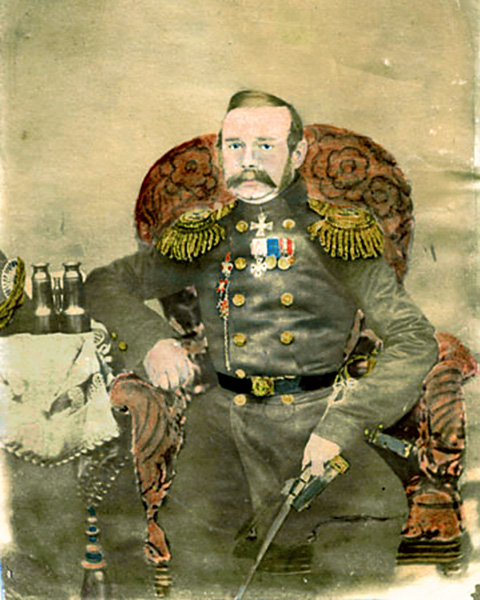
Admiral Mikhail Lavrov

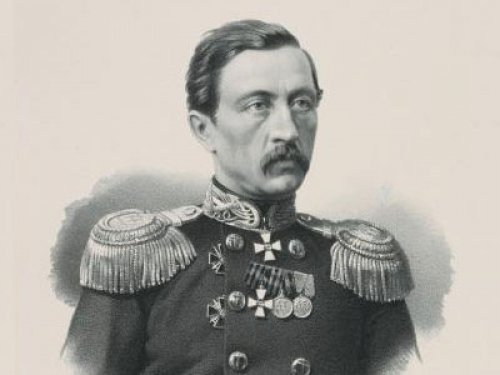
Admiral Pavel Pereleshin

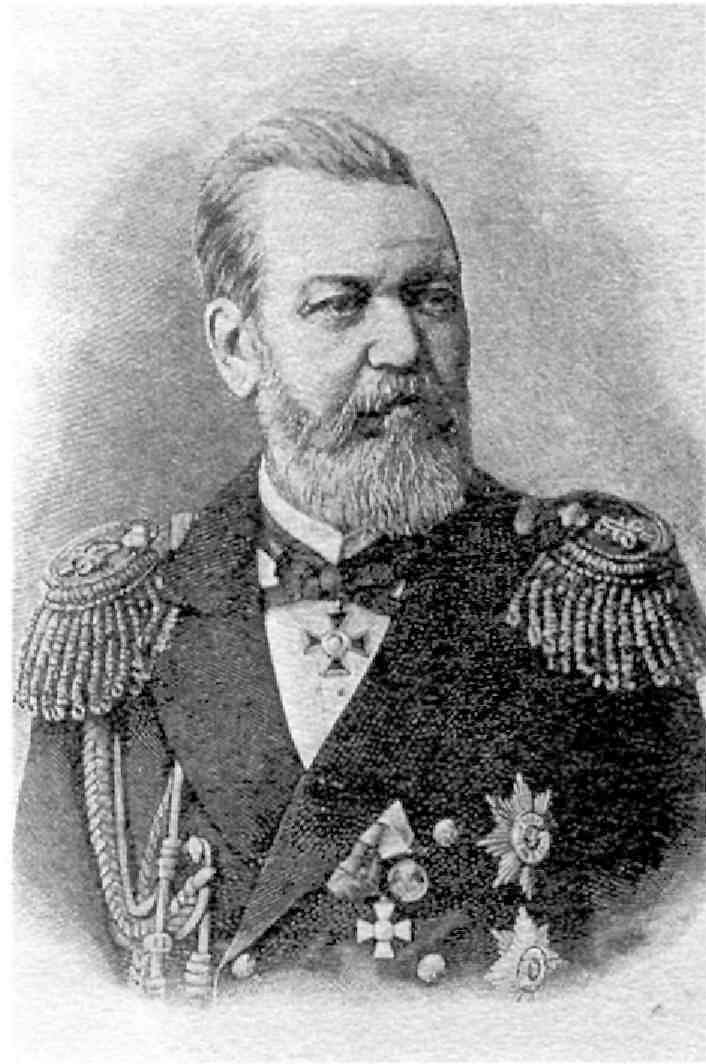
Admiral Ivan Shestakov

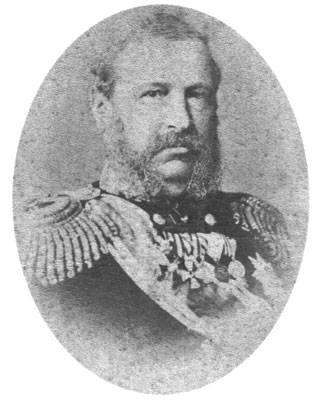
Admiral Lev Kultshitskiy

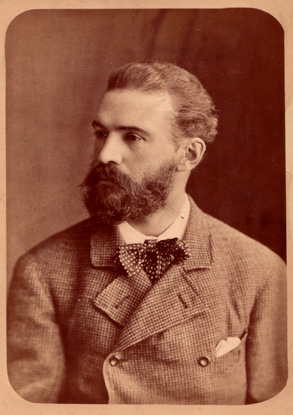
Akhilles Alferaki

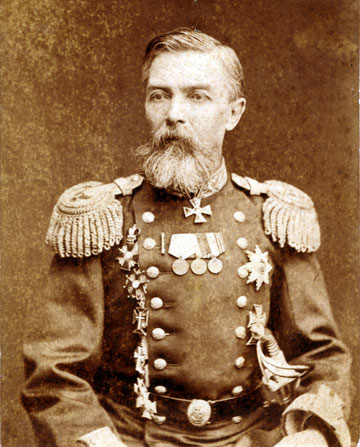
Admiral Pavel Zelenoy

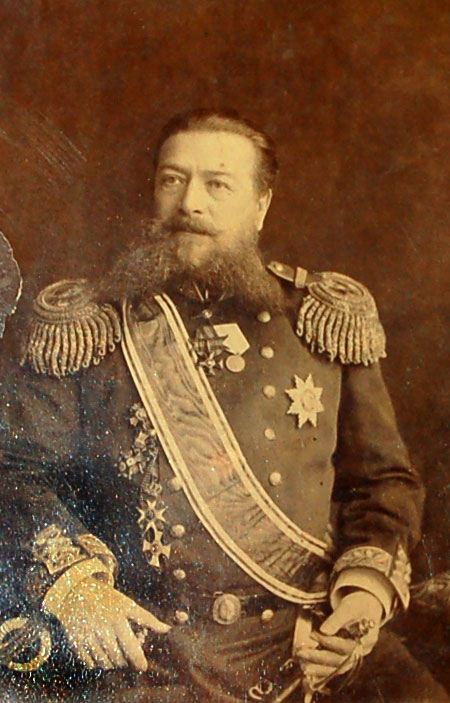
Admiral Ippolit Vogak

== See also ==
- History of Taganrog
