= Ivan Shestakov =

Russian naval officer, statesman and writer

Ivan Alexeyevich Shestakov
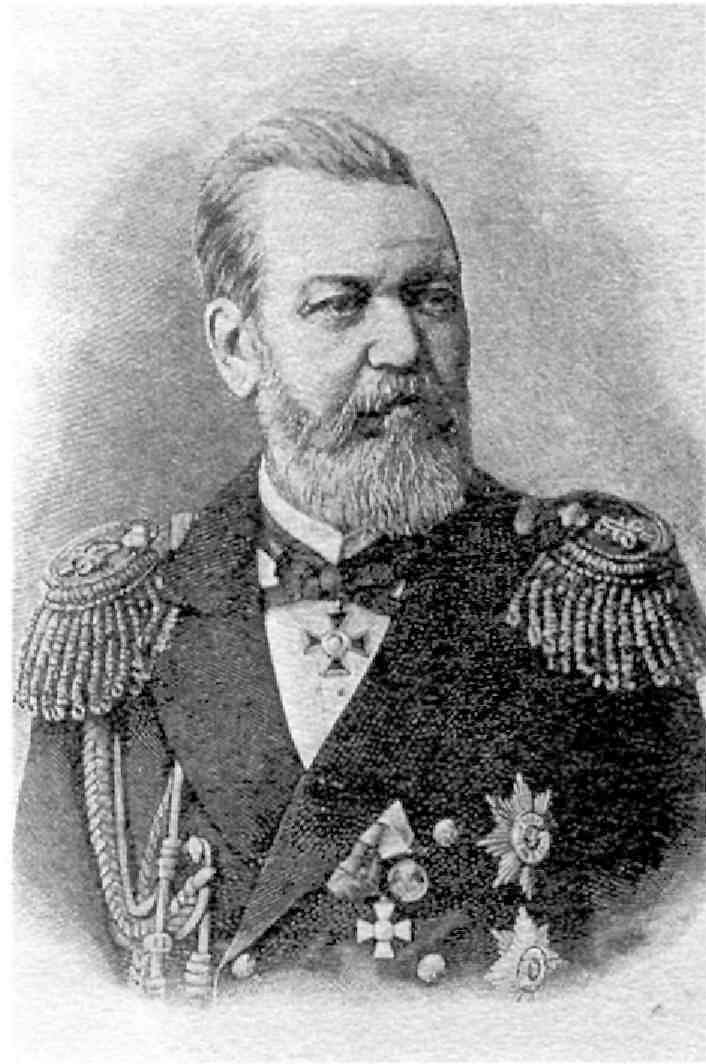
- Born: 26 April [O.S. 14 April] 1820; Smolensk Governorate, Russian Empire
- Died: 3 December 1888 (aged 68); Sevastopol, Russian Empire
- Occupations: admiral, statesman, writer

Ivan Alexeyevich Shestakov (Russian: Ива́н Алексе́евич Шестако́в; 13 April 1820 – 3 December 1888) was a Russian naval officer, statesman, and writer.

== Early years ==
Shestakov was born in the village of Syrokorenye in Smolensk Governorate to the Russian noble family of captain-lieutenant Alexey Antonovich Shestakov and Yevdokiya Ivanovna Khrapovitskaya. After finishing his studies at the Naval Cadet Corps (1830–1836), he served in the Black Sea Fleet. In 1837, Shestakov participated in the landing operation near Cape Konstantinovsky for which he was decorated with an order and promoted to the rank of midshipman. In 1838, he was on board the corvette Ifigeniya, participated in the landing operation near Shanedho, and was decorated with an Order of St. Anna of 4th degree. In 1841, Shestakov returned to Sevastopol and participated in several battles against mountaineers. Ivan Shestakov was awarded with an Order of St. Stanislaus of 3rd degree. On April 11, 1843 (Old Style) Admiral Mikhail Lazarev made him his aide-de-camp for two years and promoted him to the rank of lieutenant.

In 1847–1850, he finished the hydrographic studies of the Black Sea on board the cutter Skory.

== Service in the Baltic Fleet ==
In 1850 and 1852-1854, Shestakov was sent to England to inspect the building of military ships ordered by the Russian government. Upon his return to Russia in February 1854, he was assigned to the steamship committee and promoted to the rank of 2-rank captain and transferred to the Baltic Fleet. Shestakov participated in the defense of Kronstadt during the Crimean War on board frigate Ryurik. May 21, 1855 he was appointed aide-de-camp of General-Admiral Grand Duke Konstantin Nikolayevich. During the first years of the Crimean War Shestakov contributed to the drawing up of plans for 75 screw gunboats and 17 screw corvettes. In 1856, he was promoted to the rank of captain (1st rank) and was sent on assignment to the United States of America to inspect the building of the state-of-the-art 70-cannon screw frigate General-Admiral, with project and drawings produced personally by Shestakov. In 1859, frigate General-Admiral under command of Shestakov made a 12-day ocean voyage on board General-Admiral, stopping in Cherbourg and finally arriving at Kronstadt. The successful mission was rewarded with a third-degree Order of St. Vladimir. From 1860 to 1862 he commanded a squadron of Russian ships in the Mediterranean Sea near the coastline of Syria to protect Christians during the massacres in Lebanon. On April 23, 1861 he was promoted to the rank of rear-admiral and was included in the emperor's suite. Upon his return to Kronstadt, Shestakov was decorated with a first-degree Order of St. Stanislaus. On April 17, 1863 he was made assistant to Chief Commander of Kronstadt. From 1863 to 1864 he was a member of the Science and Shipbuilding Committee in Saint Petersburg.

== Governor of Taganrog ==
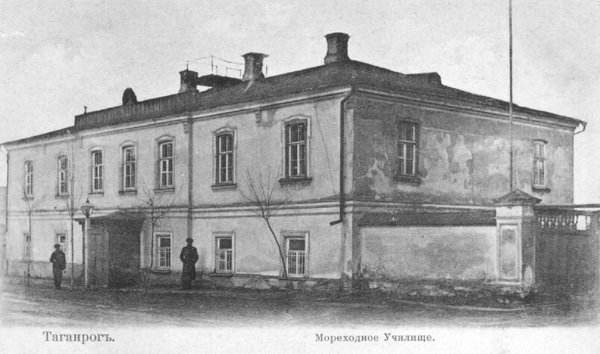
The Naval School in Taganrog

Ivan Shestakov's civil service started in 1864. April 11, 1866 (Old Style) he was assigned to the post of the governor of Taganrog (1866–1868), still remaining within H.I.M.'s suite. Shestakov initiated the establishment of the first naval school in 1868 that opened later during governorship of Johan Hampus Furuhjelm in 1874. He planned to develop coastal trade on Azov Sea, promoting sales of Russian coal for steamers on Black Sea and Azov Sea; he tried to improve navigation on Azov Sea and Don River; introduced a brand new system of lighthouses in the shallow waters near Taganrog and along Azov Sea coast to replace old equipment. In Taganrog he introduced the new system of gas lighting throughout the city, establishing a new gas plant for this purpose. In 1883, considering his achievements, the citizens of Taganrog made Ivan Shestakov an honored citizen of Taganrog.

== Minister of the Russian Navy ==
In 1868–1870- Governor of Vilno. In 1870 Ivan Shestakov gave his resignation, but in 1872 he served again as Naval Agent to Austria and Italy. In 1881 - President of the Shipbuilding Committee. In 1882 he was appointed Minister of the Russian Navy. Shestakov contributed a lot to rebirth of the Black Sea Fleet (1886) and strengthening the Baltic Fleet and Siberian Flotilla. He also introduced a new system of service for the naval officers and started a large-scale building of armored ships, including the armored cruisers Vladimir Monomakh and Admiral Nakhimov, and the Ekaterina II and Imperator Aleksandr II-class battleships. In 1888, Ivan Shestakov was promoted to the rank of the Imperial Russian Navy admiral.

Ivan Shestakov died in Sevastopol on December 3, 1888. He was buried in Sevastopol in the Temple of Saint Vladimir.

== Places named after Shestakov ==
- Shestakov Island in the Barents Sea, near Novaya Zemlya;
- Shestakovsky Boulevard; a square in Taganrog named after Shestakov in 1885 during his visit as Minister of the Russian Navy to Taganrog; later the name was changed to Ukrainsky.

== Honours and awards ==
- Order of St. Alexander Nevsky
- Order of the White Eagle (Russia)
- Cross of St. George 4th degree
- Order of Saint Vladimir, 2nd, 3rd and 4th classes
- Order of St. Anna, 1st, 2nd, 3rd and 4th classes
- Order of St. Stanislaus, 1st and 3rd classes

== Publications ==
Apart from being a great statesman, Ivan Shestakov was a recognized author. He published several articles under his real name and under the penname Excelsior in the naval journal Morskoy Sbornik (Морской Сборник) in 1850, 1854-1861, 1864 and 1871. Shestakov translated William James's The Naval History of Great Britain into the Russian language. In 1873 he published his book of memoirs under the title The Half-century of Ordinary Life (Полвека обыкновеннй жизни). His most famous book to this day is Sailing Directions in the Black Sea (Лоция Черного моря).

== External links and references ==
- History of Taganrog by Pavel Filevsky; Moscow, 1898

Government offices
Preceded by Pavel Pereleshin	Governors of Taganrog; 1866–1868	Succeeded by Lev Kulchitsky
