= Pavel Zelenoy =

Russian admiral

- Павел Алексеевич Зеленой
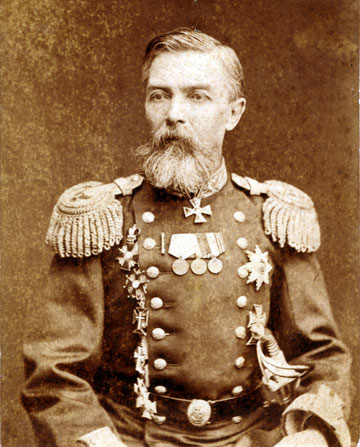
- Pavel Zelenoy
- Born: 5 January 1833
- Died: 10 January 1909 (aged 76); Odessa, Russian Empire
- Relatives: Alexander Zelenoy (son)
- Military career
- Allegiance: Russian Empire
- Branch: Imperial Russian Navy; Imperial Russian Army
- Service years: 1851-1870, 1877-1882
- Rank: Admiral
- Conflicts: Crimean War; Russo-Turkish War
- Awards: Order of Saint Vladimir; Order of Saint Stanislaus; Order of Saint Anna

Pavel Alekseyevich Zelenoy (Russian: Павел Алексеевич Зеленой, 5 January 1833 – 10 January 1909) was a Russian admiral, governor of Taganrog and Odessa.

== Military career ==
Pavel Zelenoy was born into the nobility as the son of Captain-Lieutenant Alexey Nikolaevich Zelenoy. He graduated from the Naval Cadets Corps in 1851. Zelenoy circumnavigated the globe twice - onboard the frigate Pallada in 1852-1854 and onboard the frigate Diana in 1855. In 1854 was promoted to the rank of lieutenant, in 1856-1860 served onboard the frigate Askold. He commanded the brig Almaz between 1860 and 1865, and the corvette Vityaz between 1866 and 1869.

Zelenoy retired in 1870 and served on commercial vessels. He took part in the Russo-Turkish War between 1877 and 1878, commanding a squadron of minelayers. He was in charge for the transfer of Russian troops from the seaports of the Sea of Marmara to Russia. In 1882 he was promoted to the rank of rear-admiral.

== Administrative career ==
Between 1882 and 1885 Zelenoy was Governor of Taganrog, and then Governor of Odessa from 1885 until 1898. In 1898 Zelenoy was appointed an honorary trustee of the board of trustees of the Office of the Institutions of Empress Maria. In 1891 he was promoted to the rank of lieutenant-general at the Admiralty, and in 1902 promoted to the rank of admiral.

== Family ==
Zelenoy was married to Natalia Mikhailovna Verkhovskaya (1842-1901). His children were; Admiral Alexander Zelenoy (1872-1922) and daughters Ekaterina and Olga

== Awards ==
=== Russian Awards ===
- Order of St. Anna of 1st degree
- Order of Saint Stanislaus of 1st degree
- Order of Saint Vladimir of 2nd degree

=== Foreign Awards ===
- Order of the Dannebrog (Denmark)
- Order of the Lion and the Sun (Persia)
- Commander Cross to the Order of Christ (Portugal)
- Commander Cross to the Order of the Redeemer (Greece)
- Order of the Seal of Solomon (Ethiopia)
- Order of St. Sava (Serbia)
- Order of the Cross of Takovo (Serbia)

Government offices
Preceded by Pavel Maksutov	Governors of Taganrog; 1882–1885	Succeeded by Ippolit Vogak
