= Otto Pfeilizer-Frank =

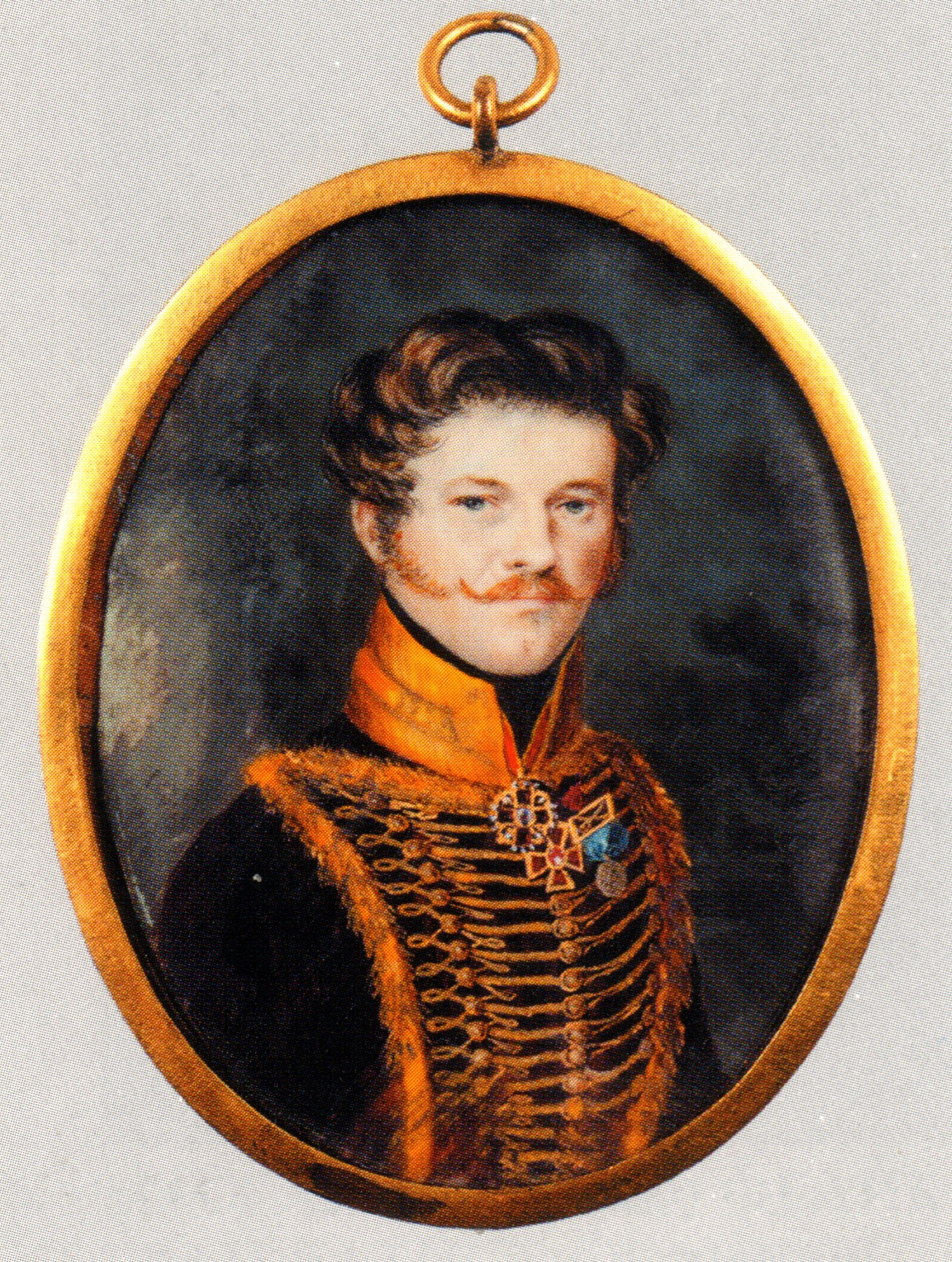

Baron Otto Wilhelm Hermann von Pfeilitzer gen. Franck, sometimes referred to as Otto Romanovich Franck or Otto Romanovich Pfeilitzer-Franck (Russian: Пфейлицер-Франк, Отто Романович, February 29, 1788 – March 9, 1844) was a Russian statesman, the 6th governor of Taganrog.

== Biography ==
Otto von Pfeilitzer-Franck was christened on February 29, 1788 (Old Style), born into the family of Hermann Casimir von Pfeilitzer-Franck and Caroline von Schlippenbach. He was educated at the First Cadet Corps (Первый кадетский корпус), which he finished in October, 1806 in the rank of a warrant officer and enrolled into the 8th Yeger regiment (8-й Егерский полк), but later in December transferred into the Akhtyrka hussar regiment (Ахтырский гусарский полк).

=== Napoleonic wars ===
Otto's regiment participated in the 1807 War against Napoleon Bonaparte, and the officer was awarded with an Order of St. Stanislaus of 3rd degree. During Napoleon's invasion of Russia Otto von Pfeilitzer-Franck participated at the Battle of Borodino for which he was awarded with an Order of St. Vladimir of 4th degree, also at the Battle of Brienne and Battle of La Rothiere for which he received an Order of St. Anna of 2nd degree. September 4, 1815 he was promoted to the rank of staff-captain (of cavalry) (штабс-ротмистр) of a corps stationed in France and aide-de-camp to Russian general Count Mikhail Semyonovich Vorontsov.

=== Further military career ===
August 1, 1816 von Pfeilitzer-Franck was assigned to a dragoon regiment in Tver, and in December 1817 to Leib Guards of the dragoon regiment and was promoted to the rank of lieutenant-colonel. July 21, 1822 he was appointed aide-de-camps to Governor-General of Novorossiysk, Count Mikhail Semyonovich Vorontsov, and assigned as Rittmeister to Leib Guards of uhlan regiment; July 14, 1823 was promoted to the rank of colonel by Count Vorontsov.

=== Government work ===
February 3, 1829 von Pfeilitzer-Franck was made official for important missions (чиновник для особых поручений) by the Governor-General of Novorossiysk and Bessarabia. This was the time of a plague epidemic in the South of Russia, and Baron was charged with the mission of preventing its further spread and complete extinction. In 1830 he was awarded with an Order of St. Stanislaus of 1st degree for success in fighting the epidemic, and in 1830 - 1831 he was the president of the preventive committee in Kherson and Odessa, fighting the cholera epidemic.

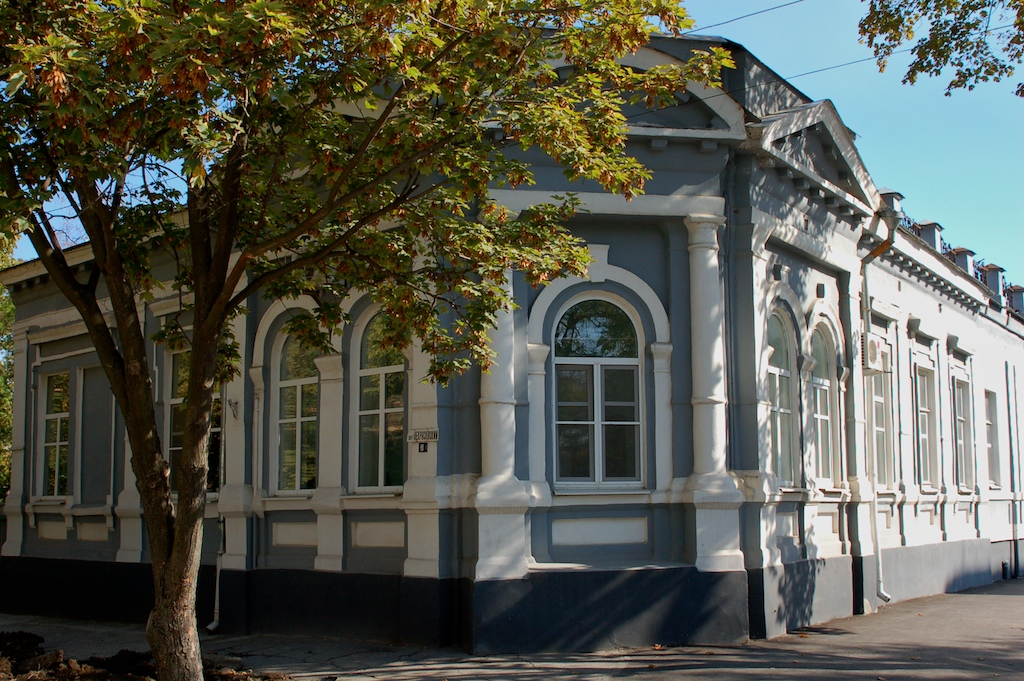
House of Baron von Pfeilitzer-Franck in downtown Taganrog

August 12, 1831 Baron Otto von Pfeilitzer-Franck was appointed Governor (civil) of Yekaterinoslav, and on June 4, 1832 - Governor of Taganrog. The Taganrog Government at that moment comprised the cities of Rostov on Don, Nakhichevan and Mariupol. He was also appointed as the chief administrator (главный попечитель) of the merchant vessels' navigation in the Azov Sea, and head of the Taganrog Customs district. In 1834 he was awarded with an Order of St. Anna of 1st degree. He remained at all of these posts until October 20, 1843, when he gave his resignation.

- note: all dates mentioned are Old Style.

== See also ==
- Siege of Taganrog
- Governor of Taganrog

== Relatives and friends ==
Otto's brother, Friedrich Otto Karl von Pfeilitzer-Franck (1786-?) was the councillor and a long-time leader of the nobility in the Yekaterinoslav Governorate (from February 12, 1838 until 1851).

Otto von Pfeilitzer-Franck was acquainted with Alexander Pushkin in Odessa, and was mentioned twice in the 2-volume collection of Pushkin's letters.

== External links and references ==
- History of Taganrog by Pavel Filevskiy, Moscow, 1898
- Taganrog Encyclopedia (Taganrog, 2002)

Government offices
Preceded by Alexander Dunaev	Governors of Taganrog; 1832–1843	Succeeded by Alexander Lieven
