= Nikolay Adlerberg =

Russian aristocrat

Count Nikolay Adlerberg
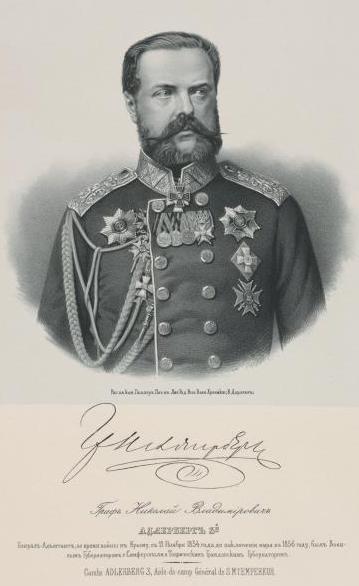
- Count Nicholas Alderberg, Governor-General of Finland

Governor-General of Finland
- In office 1866–1881
- Monarch: Alexander II
- Preceded by: Platon Rossasowski
- Succeeded by: Friedrich Reichsgraf von Heyden

Personal details
- Born: 19 May 1819 Saint Petersburg, Russian Empire
- Died: 25 December 1892 (aged 73) Munich, German Empire
- Spouse: Amalie Adlerberg
- Occupation: Statesman

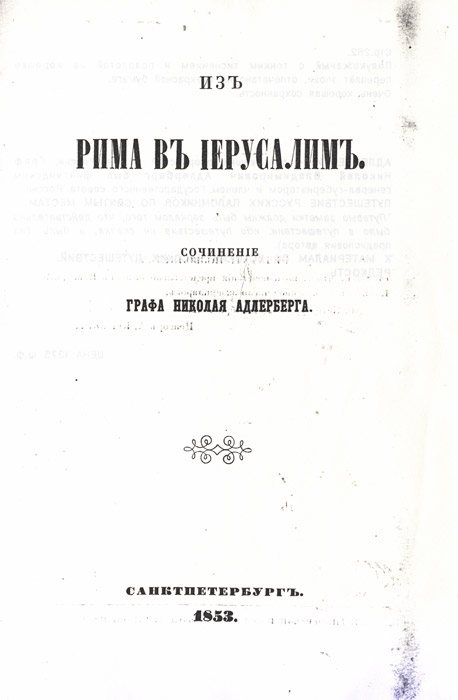
Adlerberg's From Rome to Jerusalem

Count Nikolay Vladimirovich Adlerberg (Russian: Никола́й Влади́мирович А́длерберг; 19 May 1819 – 25 December 1892) was a Russian aristocrat who served as Councilor of State and Chamberlain in the imperial court, as well as governor of Taganrog, Simferopol and Finland.

== Early life ==
Nikolay Adlerberg was born into the Estonian branch of Adlerberg family that belonged to Baltic German nobility and Swedish nobility. Born on 19 May 1819 in Saint Petersburg as the son Vladimir Fyodorovich Adlerberg, a close friend of Nicholas I, and his wife, Maria Vasilievna Nelidova (1797-1870).

== Biography ==
Nikolay Adlerberg graduated from the Page Corps of His Majesty in 1837, and in 1838 was appointed aide-de-camp to the Emperor; he participated in wars led by Russia in Caucasus (1841–1842) and Hungary in 1849. After the Hungarian campaign he was promoted to the rank of colonel and awarded with golden weapons.

Adlerberg resigned in 1852 and was attached to the Russian Ministry of the Interior, receiving the title of chamberlain in the court of His Majesty. On 10 June 1853 Adlerberg was appointed Governor of Taganrog, but he left the Governor's office in the hands of general Yegor Tolstoy in spring 1854 due to a declared state of war in Taganrog and the proximity of Crimean War actions. In 1852-1870 he was President of the Russian Imperial Post Department, who introduced the first Russian post stamps.

In 1855, Nikolay Adlerberg was promoted to the rank of mayor-general and married Countess Amalie von Lerchenfeld (1808–1888) (in the first marriage Amalie von Krüdener).

Count Adlerberg served as governor-general of Simferopol and Taurida Governorate (1854–1856) during an uneasy period of the Crimean War. Later he served at the Imperial Russian Diplomatic Mission in Berlin in 1856–1866. Nikolay Adlerberg was promoted to the rank of lieutenant-general in 1861 and infantry-general in 1870, and during sixteen years served as Governor-General of Finland (1866–1881). Being a theater enthusiast, he established the Russian Theater in Helsinki in 1868, which was named Alexander Theatre in 1879 after Alexander II of Russia.

On 22 May 1881, the Count was named member of the State Council, but was pensioned off from this post after the assassination of his protector, Emperor Alexander II of Russia. Nikolay and Amalie Adlerberg moved to Germany, where they settled at Maximilian Lerchenfeld's estate in Tegernsee near Munich.

Nikolay Adlerberg died on 25 December 1892 in Munich, Bavaria.

== Books ==
- 1853: From Rome to Jerusalem (Из Рима в Иерусалим)
  A travelogue about his 1845 travel through Greece, Egypt and Palestine
- 1863: Les Artistes des théatres impériaux de St. Pétersbourg : photographies d'après nature, avec esquisses biographiques
  Artists of the Imperial Theatres of St. Petersburg: Photographs from life, with biographical sketches
- 1867: En Orient: impressions et réminiscences
  About his second trip to Jerusalem in 1860

== Honors ==
Russian orders and decorations

- Knight of the Order of Saint Anna, 3rd Class with Bow, 1842; 2nd Class, 1849; with Crown, 1851; 1st Class with Swords, 1859
- Golden Sword "For Bravery", 1844
- Knight of the Order of Saint Vladimir, 4th Class, 1848; 3rd Class, 1854; 2nd Class, 1865; 1st Class, 1876
- Knight of the Order of Saint Stanislaus, 1st Class, 1855
- Knight of the Order of the White Eagle, 1867
- Knight of the Order of Saint Alexander Nevsky, 1872; in Diamonds, 1875

Foreign orders and decorations

- Austrian Empire:
  - Commander of the Imperial Order of Leopold, 1849
  - Knight of the Imperial Order of the Iron Crown, 1st Class, 1853
- Kingdom of Bavaria: Grand Cross of the Merit Order of Saint Michael, 1864
- Kingdom of Hanover: Grand Cross of the Royal Guelphic Order, 1863
- Grand Duchy of Hesse: Commander of the Ludwig Order, 2nd Class, 17 June 1840
- Kingdom of Prussia:
  - Knight of the Order of the Red Eagle, 1st Class, 18 October 1861; Grand Cross, 4 September 1879
  - Knight of the Royal Order of the Crown, 1st Class, 11 June 1864; with Enamel Band of the Red Eagle Order, 1865
- Saxe-Weimar-Eisenach: Grand Cross of the Order of the White Falcon, 9 July 1859

== See also ==
- Amalie Adlerberg

Political offices
Preceded by Alexander Lieven	Governor of Taganrog; 1853–1854	Succeeded by Yegor Tolstoy
Preceded by Platon Rokassovsky	Governor-General of Finland; 1866–1881	Succeeded by Frederick Heiden
