= Fyodor Logginovich van Heiden =

Russian general and official (1821–1900)

Count Fyodor Logginovich van Heiden
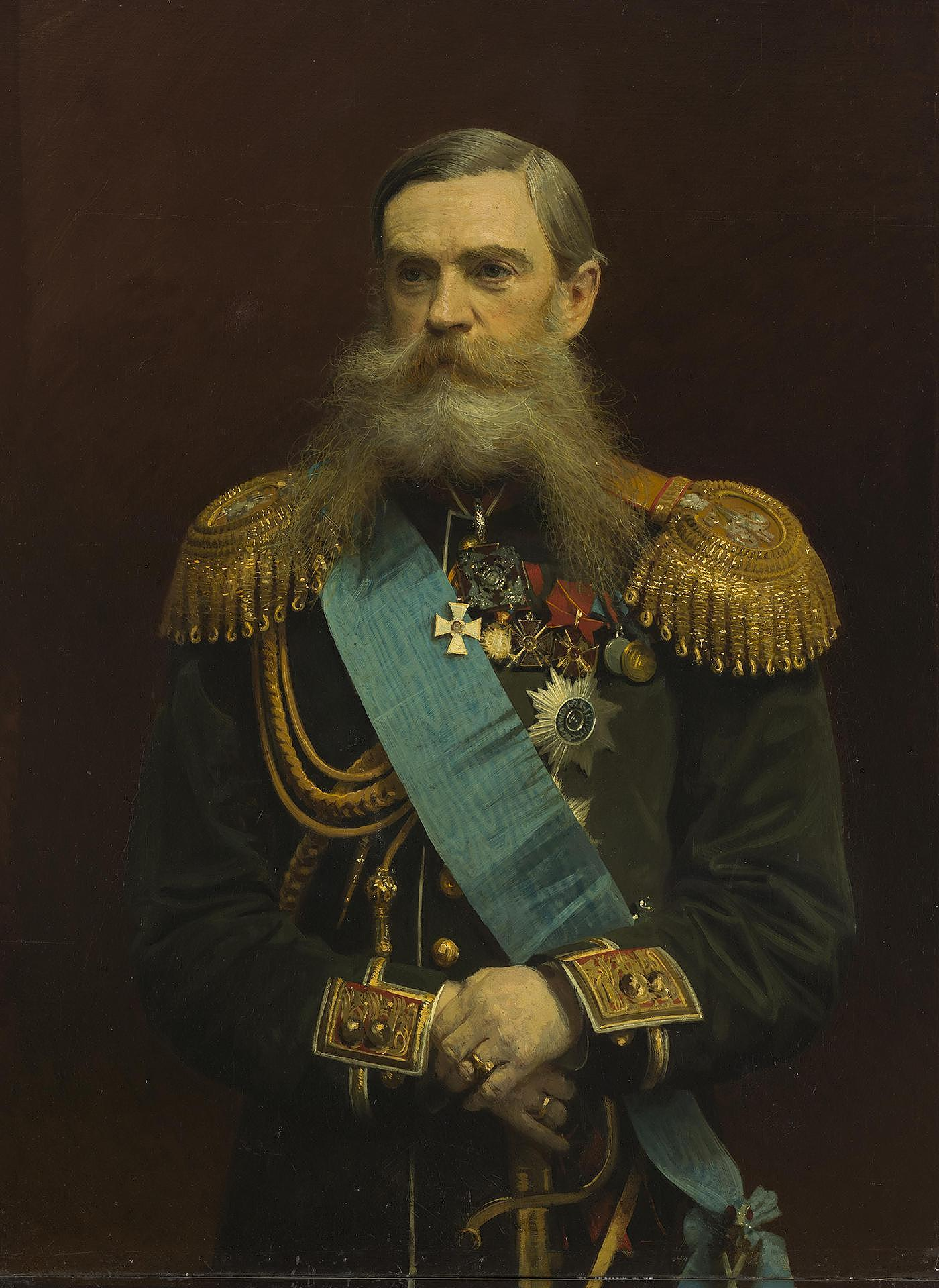
- Portrait by Ivan Kramskoi, 1881
- Born: 15 September [O.S. 3 September] 1821; Sveaborg, Grand Duchy of Finland, Russian Empire
- Died: 18 January [O.S. 6 January] 1900 (aged 78); Tsarskoye Selo, Russian Empire
- Burial place: Alexander Nevsky Lavra
- Military career
- Allegiance: Russia
- Branch: Imperial Russian Army
- Service years: 1835–1900
- Rank: General of the Infantry
- Commands: Finland Military District (1881–1897)
- Conflicts: Caucasian War; Battle of Dargo; Hungarian Revolution of 1848

Governor-General of Finland
- In office 6 June 1881 – 13 January 1897
- Monarchs: Alexander III; Nicholas II
- Preceded by: Nikolai Adlerberg
- Succeeded by: Stepan Osipovich Goncharov

Commander of the Finnish Military District
- In office 6 June 1881 – 13 January 1897
- Monarchs: Alexander III; Nicholas II
- Minister of War: Pyotr Vannovsky
- Preceded by: Nikolai Adlerberg
- Succeeded by: Stepan Osipovich Goncharov

Chief of the Main Staff of the Russian Empire
- In office 13 January 1866 – 3 June 1881
- Monarch: Nicholas II
- Chairman of the Committee of Ministers: Dmitry Nikolayevich Bludov; Pavel Pavlovich Gagarin; Nikolay Pavlovich Ignatyev
- Minister of War: Dmitry Milyutin; Pyotr Vannovsky
- Preceded by: Alexander Chernyshyov
- Succeeded by: Nikolai Obruchev

Acting Minister of War
- In office 24 April 1877 – 13 March 1878
- Monarch: Alexander III
- Chairman of the Committee of Ministers: Nikolay Pavlovich Ignatyev
- Minister of War: Dmitry Milyutin

Count Fyodor Logginovich Heiden or Geyden (born Friedrich Moritz Reichsgraf van Heiden; Russian: Фёдор Логгинович Ге́йден; 15 September [O.S. 3 September] 1821 – 18 January [O.S. 6 January] 1900), better known as Count Fyodor Logginovich van Heiden, was a Russian military commander of Dutch and Danish descent who served in the Imperial Russian Army. He served as the governor-general of Finland from 1881 to 1897. His tenure encompassed the entire reign of Alexander III, who appointed him at the start of his own reign to succeed Nikolay Adlerberg, and the four first years of the reign of Nicholas II.

== Background ==
Friedrich Moritz Reichsgraf van Heiden was born in Sveaborg, later renamed Suomenlinna, son of Dutch Lodewijk Sigismund Gustaaf van Heiden (6 September 1772 – 5 November 1850), who left the Netherlands in 1795 during the French invasion and settled in Livonia. Admiral van Heiden died in 1850. His mother was Lady Anne-Marie Akeleye, from a Danish family. The youngest son of the family, Friedrich took up a military career, converted to Orthodoxy, and took the Russified name of Fyodor Logginovich Geyden.

== Earlier career and marriage ==
Young van Heiden fought in the Caucasus and against the Hungarian Revolutionary Army, which Nicholas I assisted the Austrian emperor against. He was promoted to colonel in 1849. During the Crimean War van Heiden was chief of staff in Baltic Corps, but did not participate in any notable battles. After the war, he was promoted to major general in 1855.

In 1854, he married Countess Elisabeth Nikolayevna Zubova (1833–1894), the daughter of Countess Alexandra Raimond-Modène (1807–1839). Her father Count Nikolay Dmitrievich Zubov (1801–1871; Russian: Николай Дмитриевич Зубов) was Steward of the Russian Imperial Court, himself the son of princess Paraskeva Viazemskaia and Count Dmitri Alexandrovich Zubov, one of the brothers of Prince Platon Zubov. Countess Elisabeth was a first cousin of countess Olga van Suchtelen.

After the war, van Heiden was chiefly a member of the General Staff. He participated in Dmitry Milyutin's military reforms and was appointed as head of the General Staff (Glavni Stab) in 1866. He also chaired the conscription committee that enacted the conscription in Russia in 1874, and was in charge of the mobilization during the Turkish War, acting as Minister of War during Milyutin's absence during the Turkish War.

In 1870, van Heiden was promoted to full general. Eleven years later, he was appointed Governor-General of Finland.

== Governor-General of Finland ==
Born into a family of Dutch and Danish origin, van Heiden had converted to Orthodoxy and fully embraced Russian culture. He was a committed Slavophile. He outlined his governing policy in secret memoranda at the start of his tenure. His line favoured the Finnish-speaking population, whom he regarded as the Russians' natural allies, at the expense of the Finland Swedes, whom he considered foreign to Russian culture. He aimed at a 'liberation' of the Finns from Swedish dominance and their return to the fold of Russia.

He saw the Russification of Finland as a primary task. However, his reputation among Finns is better than many of his contemporaries, due to his subtle methods. By contrast, General Bobrikov, who was appointed governor-general in 1998, was widely considered a tyrant who promoted extreme Russification policies.

To attain this goal, van Heiden supported the use of Finnish as the language of administration, university, and military, as opposed to the traditionally dominant Swedish. In appointments to public offices in government, administration, justice, and military, he favored the conservative and monarchist Finnish Party and those who had learned the Russian language well and resided in Russia, as opposed to possibly separatist Swedes and the Swedish-speaking Liberal Party. Van Heiden furthered trade between Finland and Russia, and reduced customs formalities.

During his tenure, several administrative reforms were implemented, among them a broad delegation of matters from the Emperor to the Senate, the right of initiative for the Estates, and the convening of the Diet every three years. Van Heiden also planned an expansion of press freedom, which had been restricted since the 1860s, but this was rejected in St. Petersburg.

Van Heiden obtained an imperial rescript calling for a codification of Finnish laws. This led to the establishment of two committees: one for general law drafting and one specifically for the constitutional laws. Although the rescript had concerned legislation in general, the constitutional laws were drawn into the work at a later stage. The work of the constitutional committee ultimately contributed to the February Manifesto of 1899, which has led some historians to interpret the rescript as a deliberate attack on Finland's constitutional autonomy – an interpretation that does not reflect van Heiden's original intent.

During the crisis period of 1888–1891, van Heiden acted as a mediator between Finnish and Russian interests. The most significant issue was the February Manifesto on the postal service of 1890, which placed the Finnish postal system under Russian administration. On the constitutional question, van Heiden chaired a commission to which he had invited three Russian legal experts. While the Finnish side maintained its codification proposal, the Russian demands hardened progressively as the process continued, eventually culminating in the proposals that formed the basis of the February Manifesto of 1899.

Van Heiden and Minister State Secretary Casimir Ehrnrooth had both persuaded the Emperor to ratify a new criminal code, which was subsequently suspended after serious flaws were identified. Ehrnrooth was forced to resign as a result, while van Heiden escaped with lesser consequences.

Another of his priorities was to clarify jurisdiction within Finland, defining which decisions belonged to the imperial government and which to autonomous local governments in Finland.

In the final years of his tenure, van Heiden's influence diminished considerably. His proposed amendments were increasingly disregarded, and he resigned on 13 January 1897, after which he was appointed a member of the State Council.

He was awarded Order of Prince Danilo I and a number of other decorations.

== Sources ==
- "Гейден, Федор Логинович" . Brockhaus and Efron Encyclopedic Dictionary (in Russian). 1906.
- (in Finnish) Seitkari, Olavi: Kenraalikuvernööri kreivi Fedor Logginovits Heiden , Genos 18 (1947), pp. 80–86

Political offices
Preceded by Nikolay Adlerberg	Governor-General of Finland; 1881–1897	Succeeded by Nikolai Ivanovich Bobrikov
