= Lev Kulchitsky =

Russian admiral (1813–1873)

Lev Yakovlevich Kulchitsky
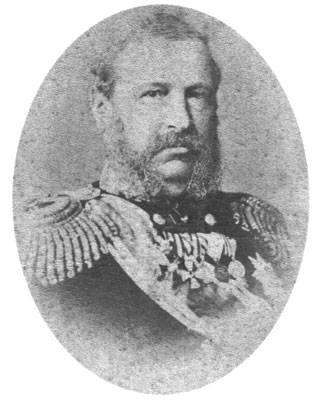
- Born: 4 March [O.S. 20 February] 1813; Russian Empire
- Died: 7 December 1873 (aged 60); Taganrog, Russian Empire
- Occupations: admiral, statesman

Lev Yakovlevich Kulchitsky (Russian: Лев Яковлевич Кульчицкий, 4 March [O.S. 20 February] 1813 – 7 December [O.S. 25 November] 1873) was a rear admiral of the Imperial Russian Navy and member of the Imperial Admiralty Council, the supreme administrative body of the Imperial Navy. Kulchitsky also served as the 13th mayor of Taganrog, a port city located in southwest Russia, within the Rostov Oblast.

== Biography ==
Graduated from Cadet Corps in 1831. Served in the Black Sea Fleet, promoted to captain-lieutenant in 1849, captain second rank since 1855, captain first rank since 1858, rear-admiral since 1866. During Crimean War Lev Kulchitskiy commanded the paddle frigate Gromonosets.

In 1860 he was appointed chairman of the military trial at Nikolaev port. In 1863 appointed chief of the Konstantinovskaya Navy Station in Tsemes Bay. Kulchitsky served as Governor of Taganrog from 1868 to 1873. After his death he was interred in the crypt of The All-Saints Church in Taganrog at the Taganrog Old Cemetery

== Awards ==
- Order of St. George of 4th degree

== External links and references ==
- History of Taganrog by Pavel Filevskiy, Moscow; 1898.
- Taganrog Encyclopedia, Taganrog, 2002.

Government offices
Preceded by Ivan Shestakov	Governors of Taganrog; 1868–1873	Succeeded by acting governor Achilles Alferaki
