= Alexander Zelenoy =

Russian and Soviet admiral (1872–1922)

Alexander Pavlovich Zelenoy
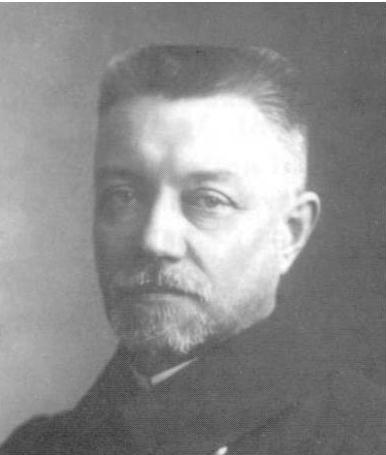
- Born: 25 August 1872; Odessa, Russian Empire
- Died: 4 September 1922 (aged 50); Petrograd, Soviet Union
- Military career
- Allegiance: Russian Empire; USSR
- Branch: Imperial Russian Navy; Soviet Navy
- Service years: 1901–1918
- Rank: Rear Admiral
- Commands: Baltic Fleet
- Conflicts: World War I Russian Civil War
- Awards: Order of Saint Stanislaus Third Class; Order of Saint Anna Third Class

Alexander Pavlovich Zelenoy (Russian: Александр Павлович Зеленой, 6 September 1872 (24 August New Style), Odessa - 4 September 1922, Petrograd) was a Russian and Soviet naval commander. Graduated in naval college, participated in World War I. A rear-admiral, the head of mine defence on the Baltic Sea and the head of the Staff of the Baltic Fleet in 1917. Famous for being one of the commanders of the Ice Cruise of the Baltic Fleet in 1918.

Alexander Zelenoy was the son of General Pavel Zelenoy. He graduated from the Sea Cadet Corps in 1892 and completed the mine warfare officers course in 1901. He commanded the destroyers Boyevoy and Dobrovolets between 1908 and 1910. He was posted as a naval attaché to Great Britain in 1910 and was given command of the battleship Andrei Pervozvanny in 1912. In 1914 he was given a staff role in the Baltic Fleet and promoted to rear admiral. He became chief of staff in 1917 and took part in the ice cruise. He became commander of the Baltic Fleet in 1919 and took part in the defence of Petrograd during the Russian Civil War.

Zelenoy died of natural causes in September 1922 and was buried in the Kazachye Cemetery of the Alexander Nevsky Lavra.
