= En Orient =

1860 travel journal by Nikolai Adlerberg

En Orient: impressions et réminiscences
- Author: Nikolai Vladimirovich Adlerberg
- Language: French
- Subject: Travel, Middle East
- Genre: Travel literature
- Published: St-Petersburg
- Publisher: Imprimerie Centrale du ministère des finances
- Publication date: 1867
- Publication place: Russia
- Pages: 532 + 520 pages
- OCLC: OCLC 21018294 (all editions).

En Orient: impressions et réminiscences is a travel journal written by the Russian Nikolai Vladimirovich Adlerberg (1819-1892) in 1860. Adlerberg was a military man, politician, celebrity and Orthodox. This book is divided into two volumes, both depicting Adlerberg's family religious pilgrimage to Constantinople. He claims that the aim of his volumes is to describe his pious memories and more specifically those of Holy places and Jesus Christ. The first edition of both volumes was published in French 1867 by the Imprimerie Centrale du ministère des finances in St-Petersburg. The original edition of the first volume counts 532 pages and the second volume, 520.

== Context ==
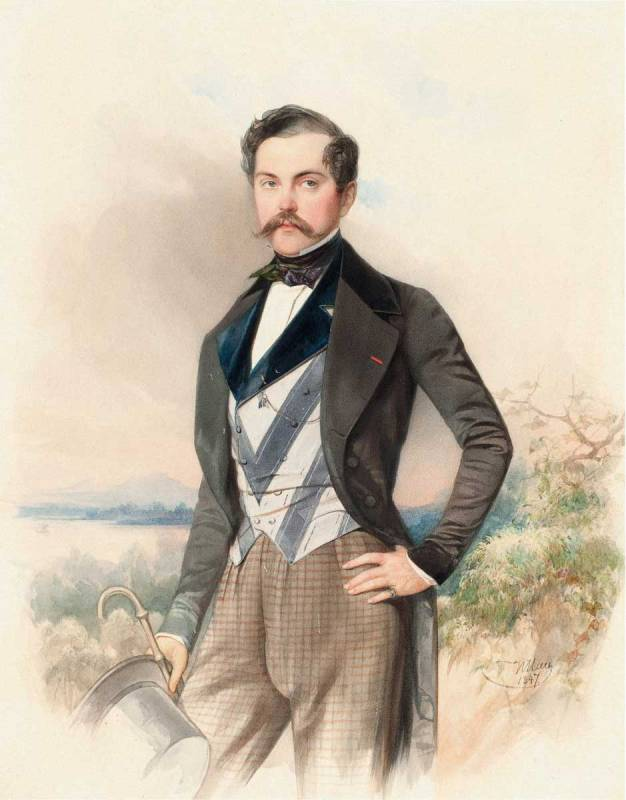
Nikolai Vladimirovich Adlerberg

Adlerberg's En Orient: impressions et réminiscences was a depiction of his religious pilgrimage to the Holy places fought for during the Crimean war (1853-1856). At the time of his writing En Orient: impressions et réminiscences, the Crimean War (1853-1856) had just ended. This war mainly opposed Russia to the Ottoman Empire allied with Britain and France. It began due to the crumbling of the Ottoman Empire, the feud between Orthodoxy (supported by the Russians) and Christianity (represented by the French) for Holy places and Russia's colonial endeavors, notably. The outcome of the war was the defeat of Russia. The conflict for the control of the Holy places began before the Crimean War, it started in the 18th century. One aspect of this quarrel was the fight to take control of the Golden Gate in Jerusalem. Russia stood as a defender of the Orthodox subjects in Palestine and advocated for their being given control of the Holy places. However, the Russian claims were not fulfilled. To resolve the issue, the Sultan Abdülmecid I gave the key to the Golden Gate, praying rights and ownership of the Holy sites to the Christians in 1852. Sultan Abdülmecid I guaranteed the Orthodoxes that their rights would remain unchanged, but Russia strongly protested this act. This conflict continued during the Crimean War, during which Russia's interest lied in taking control of the Holy places to support the importance of the Orthodox community in the Ottoman Empire. More specifically, Tsar Nicholas I aimed at re-establishing the Orthodox Christian religion in Constantinople. He also wished to take over various significant sites from the early Christianity in Jerusalem and its vicinity, such as the Church of the Nativity.

In addition to the Crimean War, another contextual feature surrounding En Orient: impressions et réminiscences was the Caucasian wars (1817–1864). As a military man, Adlerberg fought in the wars of Caucasus. The Caucasus was situated between the Black and Caspian Seas. The totality of the South Caucasus and part of the North were annexed by Russia as a result of the Russo-Persian wars of 1804-1813 and 1826-1828 that opposed Iran to Russia.

== Publishing history ==
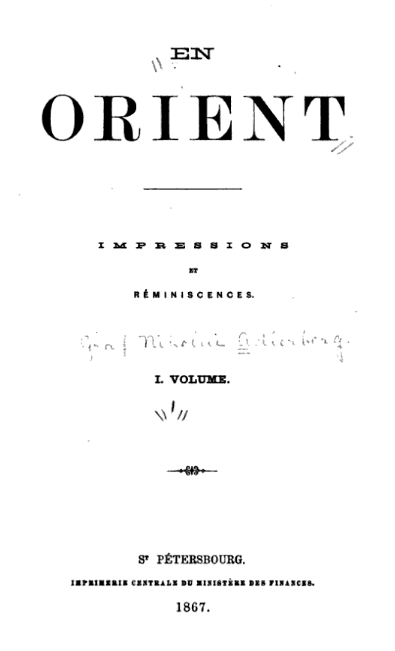
Title page from the first volume of En Orient: impressions et réminiscences.

Both volumes of En Orient: impressions et réminiscences were first published in French in 1867 by the Imprimerie Centrale du ministère des finances in St-Petersburg. In Russia, at the time, French was a language used by the aristocracy. One copy of this edition can be found the Maastricht University in the Jesuit collection at the inner city library. In 1867, a Russian version of this book was published by the same editor in St-Petersburg. This version of the book can be found at the Danish Royal Library. A second edition of En Orient: impressions et réminiscences was published in 1869 in St-Petersburg by Impr. H. Schmitzdorff. In later years, both volumes of this book were re-edited by multiple printing companies. Both volumes of En Orient: impressions et réminiscences have been published in its language of origin in 2018 by HardPress and in 2019 by Forgotten Books.

An English-language version of the book was published in 2008 by BiblioLife.

== Content ==
Both volumes of En Orient: impressions et réminiscences are travel books that take the form of journals. There are no pictures or illustrations in any of these volumes.

=== En Orient: impressions et réminiscences (vol.1) ===
The first volume counts 532 pages and is divided into 26 chapters. Adlerberg depicts the impressions and descriptions of his travels through Egypt and Palestine. Adlerberg has also argued that these depictions were not exaggerated. In the preface, Adlerberg also claims that he does not wish to impose his religious view on his readers. This journal is written in the first person and using the pronoun "we", referring to Adlerberg and his family. However, at times, he also uses the second person. In the latter case, Adlerberg considers the reader as a prospective traveler in the regions he visits. He also describes his own experiences as if it was the reader's.

This volume can be divided into three main parts, his description of the beginning of his trip, before his arrival in Egypt, his stay and travels in the latter and in Palestine. In En Orient: impressions et réminiscences, three chapters are dedicated to the descriptions of his travels from one main destination to the other. The chapters are called "Dans l'adriatique", "Dans la méditéranée" and "En mer, Pour La Palestine". In this "Dans l'adriatique", Adlerberg writes that he began his trip to Palestine as a result of a need for new impressions and more serious ideas. He claims that he wished to go on a far away trip, different, and more adventurous than the usual pilgrimages from European tourists. He then goes on to describe how Jerusalem and Palestine are places related to the Bible and Jesus. "Dans la méditéranée", Adlerberg's trip momentarily stops in the Corfu Island, which he then goes on to describe. He talks about the churches, nature, and the weather. In "En mer, Pour La Palestine", Adlerberg talks about his boat trip to Jaffa. In this chapter, he describes the commander and the other travelers accompanying him and his family.

==== Egypt ====
During his stay in Egypt, Adlerberg visits Alexandria and Cairo. In these cities, he claims himself to be a tourist. He describes his stay in various hotels and the food they are served. Adlerberg and his family also take part in touristic attraction such as visiting the pyramids of Gizeh or various markets within Cairo and Alexandria. During these activities, Adlerberg describes the various individuals he encounters, translating some native vocabulary words for the reader. During his stay in Egypt and as he was a celebrity and close to Tsar Nicholas I, Adlerberg and his family met various important figures. Two of these personalities were the Consul of Egypt and the vice-pacha, Saïd-Pacha. Adlerberg also describes more into detail the culture of Egypt, highlighting its backwardness.

==== Palestine ====
In the chapters dedicated to Palestine and especially Jerusalem, Adlerberg focuses on religion and his faith as he is a fervent Orthodox. He draws multiple parallels between the places he sees/visits/passes by and what happens in the Bible. He also describes his visit of Churches where his faith really transcribes. For instance, sometimes, he claims he hears the voice of God or falls on his knees, overwhelmed by the religious presence surrounding him.

== Reception ==
En Orient: impressions et réminiscences' publication may give information regarding its reception. In the same year of its original publication, a Russian version of the books was published in Russian. French, the original language of the book, was spoken among the Russian aristocracy. It was made available to the larger public by being translated in Russian in the same year. Moreover, a second edition of En Orient: impressions et réminiscences was published two years after its original publication. This version of the book is identical to the original publication. En Orient: impressions et réminiscences was not banned but re-printed illustrates that it was not opposed by Tsar Nicholas I or most of the Russian population in general. Furthermore, the second volume of En Orient: impressions et réminiscences was later chosen by scholars as culturally important.
