= Pavel Pereleshin =

Russian admiral and general

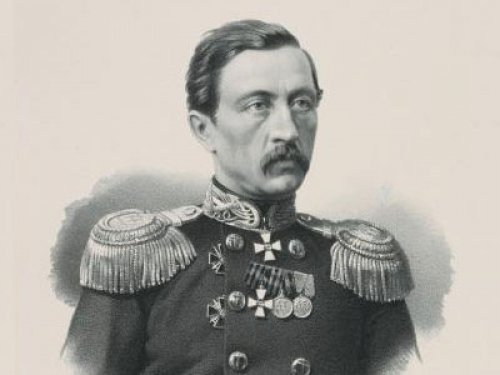
- Born: 27 June 1821; Shchetinino, Kostroma Oblast, Kostroma Oblast, Russian Empire
- Died: 28 February 1901 (aged 79); Saint Petersburg, Russian Empire
- Occupation: admiral

Pavel Alexandrovich Pereleshin (Russian: Павел Александрович Перелешин, 27 June 1821 – 28 February 1901) was a Russian admiral and general.

After graduating from the Saint Petersburg Naval Corps in 1834, Pavel Pereleshin served as midshipman in the Baltic Fleet on frigate Neva, and was promoted to the rank of warrant officer in the Black Sea Fleet in 1837. In 1839, he participated in the landing operation near Su-bashi (in modern Sochi), Caucasus, and was awarded the Order of St. Anna, 4th grade for courage.

In 1840 Pereleshin mapped the coastline on board the schooner Zabiyaka. He participated in the Crimean War and was awarded an Order of St.Vladimir for the Battle of Sinop in 1853 on board the battleship Paris. During the Siege of Sevastopol (1854), he was in charge of the 5th section of the Russian defense line. He was wounded twice, on 28 March and on 26 May 1855. He was awarded with two Orders of St. George, of the 4th and 3rd grades, for heroism during the attack of 6 June 1855.

In 1856-1857, he was captain of the battleships Ne tron' menya and Vladimir. Since 1860 Pereleshin served at the Naval Corps due to health problems. In 1861, he was appointed chief of the Baku maritime station and captain of the Baku seaport. In 1863, he was promoted to the rank of the rear-admiral. In 1864-1866 Pereleshin was Governor of Taganrog and the chief administrator (главный попечитель) of the merchant vessels' navigation in the Azov Sea, and since December 1873 - Governor of Sevastopol, where he started the reconstruction of the city after Crimean War.

In 1881 Pereleshin was promoted to the rank of vice-admiral and was appointed director of the Inspection Dept. at the Ministry of the Navy, in 1883 - member of The Admiralty Council.

Pavel Alexandrovich Pereleshin was promoted to the rank of admiral on 21 April 1891. The Russian admiral was decorated with all imperial Russian decorations and orders to the Order of St. Vladimir of the first degree inclusive, and in 1896 he was awarded with a memorable ring with the portrait of HM Alexander III of Russia.

Pereleshin died in Saint Petersburg on 28 February 1901, and was buried on 7 March 1901 in Sevastopol's Temple of St. Vladimir.

== Honours and awards ==
- Order of St. Anna, 4th class (1939)
- Order of St. Vladimir, 4th class (1853)
- Order of St. Anna, 2nd class (1854)
- Order of St. Vladimir, 3rd class (1855)
- Order of St. George, 4th class (1855)
- Order of St. George, 3rd class (1856)
- Gold Sword for Bravery (1856)
- Order of St. Stanislaus, 1st class (1866)
- Order of St. Vladimir, 1st class (1893)
- Order of St. Andrew the Apostle (1898)

== External links and references ==
Government offices
Preceded by Mikhail Lavrov	Governors of Taganrog; 1864–1866	Succeeded by Ivan Shestakov
