= Pavel Maksutov =

Imperial Russian Navy rear-admiral (1825-1882)

Pavel Petrovich Maksutov (Russian: Максутов, Павел Петрович April 25, 1825 – May 2, 1882) was an Imperial Russian Navy rear-admiral, prince, a hero of the Crimean War as well as the 15th governor of Taganrog.

Pavel Maksutov was born in Penza into the family of Pyotr Ivanovich Maksutov, a family of Russian nobles. His brothers and sisters were: Nikolay, Alexander (lieutenant, heavily wounded on August 24, 1854, during the siege of Petropavlovsk-Kamchatsky, perishing on the 10th of September of the same year), Yekaterina, Dmitri (rear-admiral, the last governor of Alaska), Pyotr and Georgy.

Entering the Naval Cadet Corps in Saint Petersburg on March 16, 1838, he was promoted to the rank of reefer in January 1840. In 1840-1841 he sailed in the Baltic Sea on frigates Alexander Nevsky and Kastor. January 1, 1841, he was promoted to the rank of midshipman. From 1842 to 1846, he served on various ships in the Baltic Sea, and in early 1847 was transferred into the Black Sea Fleet.

In 1847-1848 he participated in landing operations near Abkhazia, April 11, 1848, as well as being promoted to the rank of lieutenant for military actions against the mountaineers during Caucasian War. From 1849 to 1850, he served on the brig "Theseus", sailing from Odessa to Constantinople and further to the Aegean Sea. After returning to Black Sea, from 1851 to 1852 serving on the battleship Tri Sviatitelia and on the brig "Andromache".

During the Crimean War, Maksutov served as flag-officer by rear-admiral Fyodor Mikhailovich Novosilsky and participated in the Battle of Sinop on board Paris, a battleship. For enduring 349 days of the siege of Sevastopol (1854), he was awarded with an Order of St. Vladimir of 4th degree with ribbon, as well as being promoted to the rank of captain-lieutenant. After the end of war, he would go on to receive two Orders of St. Anna, the 2nd and 3rd degrees.

From 1863 to 1876, Pavel Maksutov served as governor of Berdyansk and commander of the Berdyansk seaport. In April 1878 he was promoted to the rank of major-general of the fleet (as of January 22, 1879, rank was renamed "rear-admiral") and served as the Governor of Taganrog from 1876 to 1882, where he became infamous after being implicated in the so-called Valliano Affair. This worsened his state of health and precipitated his death. He died on May 2, 1882, in Taganrog and was buried in Sevastopol.

== Honours and awards ==
- Order of St. Vladimir, 4th class (1853)
- Order of St. Anne, 3rd class (1854), 2nd class (1855)
- Gold Sword for Bravery (1855)

== See also ==
- Dmitri Petrovich Maksutov

== External links and references ==
- Valliano Affair (in Russian)
- Prince Maksutov in Berdyansk (in Russian)
- Нахимов П. С. Документы и материалы. М., 1954
- Скрицкий Н. В. Русские адмиралы — герои Синопа. М., 2006
- Списки титулованным родам и лицам Российской империи. Издание Департамента герольдии Правительствующего сената. СПб., 1892
- Список лицам, Главный морской штаб Его Императорского Величества составляющим, на 1866 год. СПб., 1866

Government offices
| Preceded by Johan Hampus Furuhjelm | Governors of Taganrog; 1876–1882 | Succeeded by Pavel Zelenoy |
