= Alexander Friedrich von Lieven =

Russian general and politician

Alexander Friedrich Fürst von Lieven (Russian: Александр Карлович Ливен, romanized: Aleksandr Karlovich Liven; 1801–1880) was a Baltic German infantry general and senator.

== Life ==
HSH prince Alexander von Lieven was born on January 14, 1801, into an ancient noble family of Lieven. He received a good education at home and in 1818 enrolled into the Life Guards Grenadeer regiment and in 1820 was promoted to the rank of lieutenant (Russian: поручик). Four years later, in 1824, Lieven was transferred into the Moscow regiment and was promoted to the rank of aide-de-camp to the Emperor Nicholas I of Russia. During the campaign of the Russo-Turkish War, 1828–1829, Alexander Lieven participated in the siege of Varna. In 1831, during the November Uprising, his regiment was sent to subdue the rebels in the Congress Poland, and took part in the siege of Warsaw and Modlin Fortress. In 1832, after the war was over he was promoted to the rank of colonel and transferred into the Leib Guards of Preobrazhensky regiment. In 1838, he was made aide-de-camp to the commander of the 5th Infantry Corps, Lieutenant-General Anders, in 1842 Lieven was promoted to the rank of mayor-general and received the position of the second commander of Sevastopol. In 1844–1853 Lieven was Governor of Taganrog. In 1853, Lieven was promoted to the rank of lieutenant-general and was made senator. In 1857 he was appointed Chairman of the Inspection Committee (Russian: ревизионный комитет) in Moscow. In 1861 he was appointed full member of the Imperial Philanthropic Society (Russian: Императорское Человеколюбивое общество) and president of its Moscow-based committee. Lieven was promoted to the rank of infantry general in 1875, keeping his senator's title. He died on February 17, 1880.

== External links and references ==
Government offices
Preceded by Otto Pfeilizer-Frank	Governors of Taganrog; 1844–1853	Succeeded by Nikolay Adlerberg
