= Alekseevskaya Women's Gymnasium =

- Алексеевская женская гимназия
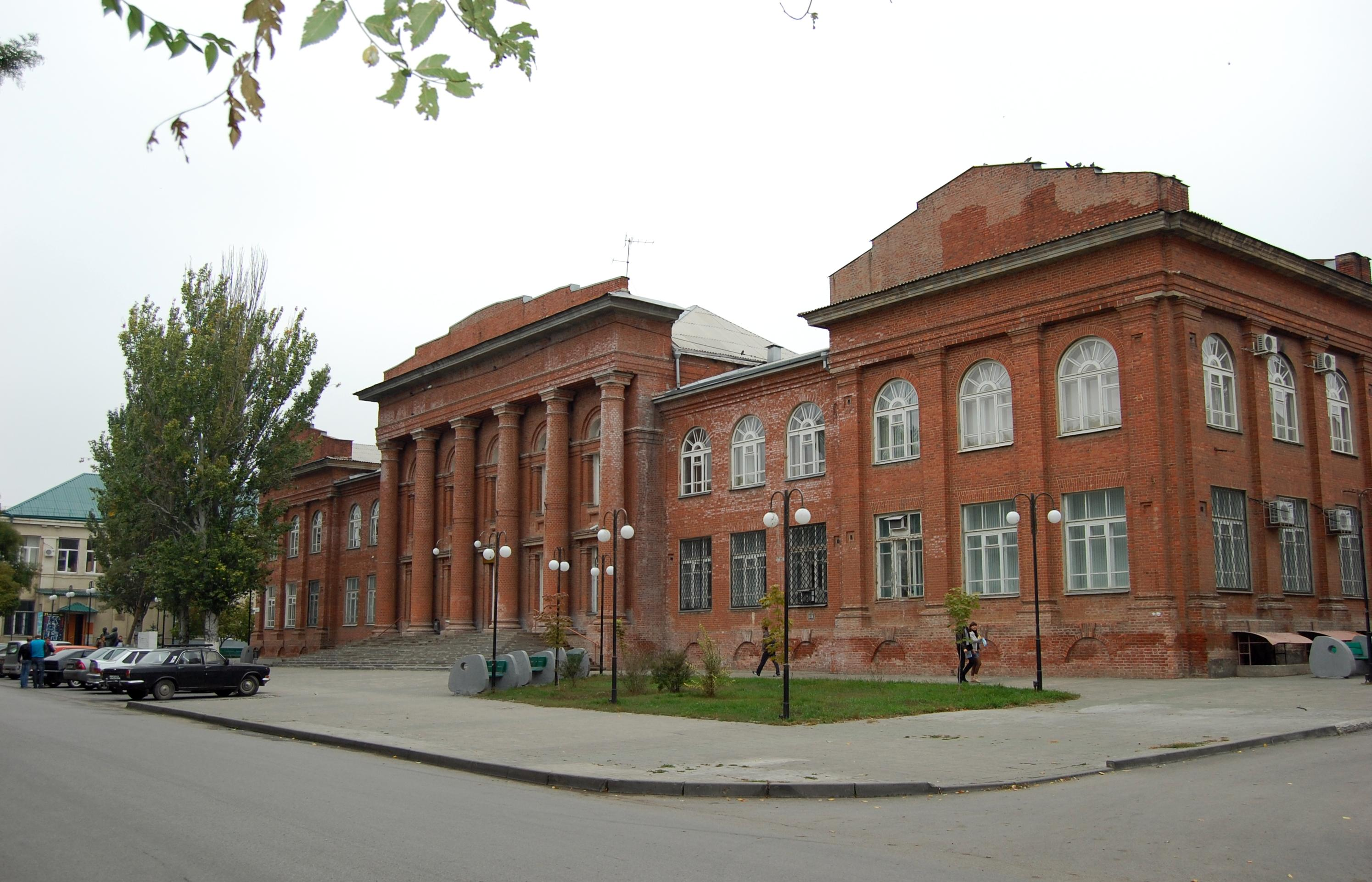
- Interactive map of the Alekseevskaya Women's Gymnasium area

General information
- Location: Taganrog, Rostov Oblast, Russia
- Coordinates: 47°12′20″N 38°56′23″E

Design and construction
- Architect: A. Ginzburg

Alekseevskaya Women's Gymnasium was a women's gymnasium that existed in Taganrog, Russian Empire, from 1911 to 1917.

== History ==
The history of the Alekseevskaya Women's Gymnasium dates back to September 1905, when a note by P. P. Filevsky (the first historian of the city of Taganrog) was sent to the City Duma, in which he substantiated the urgent need to establish another female gymnasium in Taganrog. By the beginning of the 20th century, the Mariinsky Girls' Gymnasium was overcrowded, and up to 50 students were enrolled in the classrooms. The City Duma supported Filevsky's appeal and, in 1906, decided to open the second women's gymnasium in Taganrog.

The Second Women's Gymnasium was opened only in November 1911, when pupils began to use it. The gymnasium, for more than three years, was located in a rented private house. The author of the project was the architect A. Ginzburg.

Because of the First World War, the Mitava Women's Gymnasium was evacuated from the Baltic in Taganrog. Girls from Austrian Galicia, whose parents died during the war, were also placed in the Mitava Women's Gymnasium. It was connected with the second female gymnasium in Taganrog which was transferred to the new building under the general name "Alekseevskaya" in honor of the heir, Tsarevich Alexei. Alekseevskaya women's gymnasium existed for a short time. During the Soviet times, the building housed alternately a school, an orphanage, and an Agricultural Technical School.

From 1928 to 1933, the building of the Alekseevskaya Gymnasium housed the natural-historical department of the Taganrog Museum of Local History. At the moment, the building is located on Campus "A" of the Engineering and Technology Academy of the Southern Federal University.
