= Yegor Tolstoy =

Russian governor

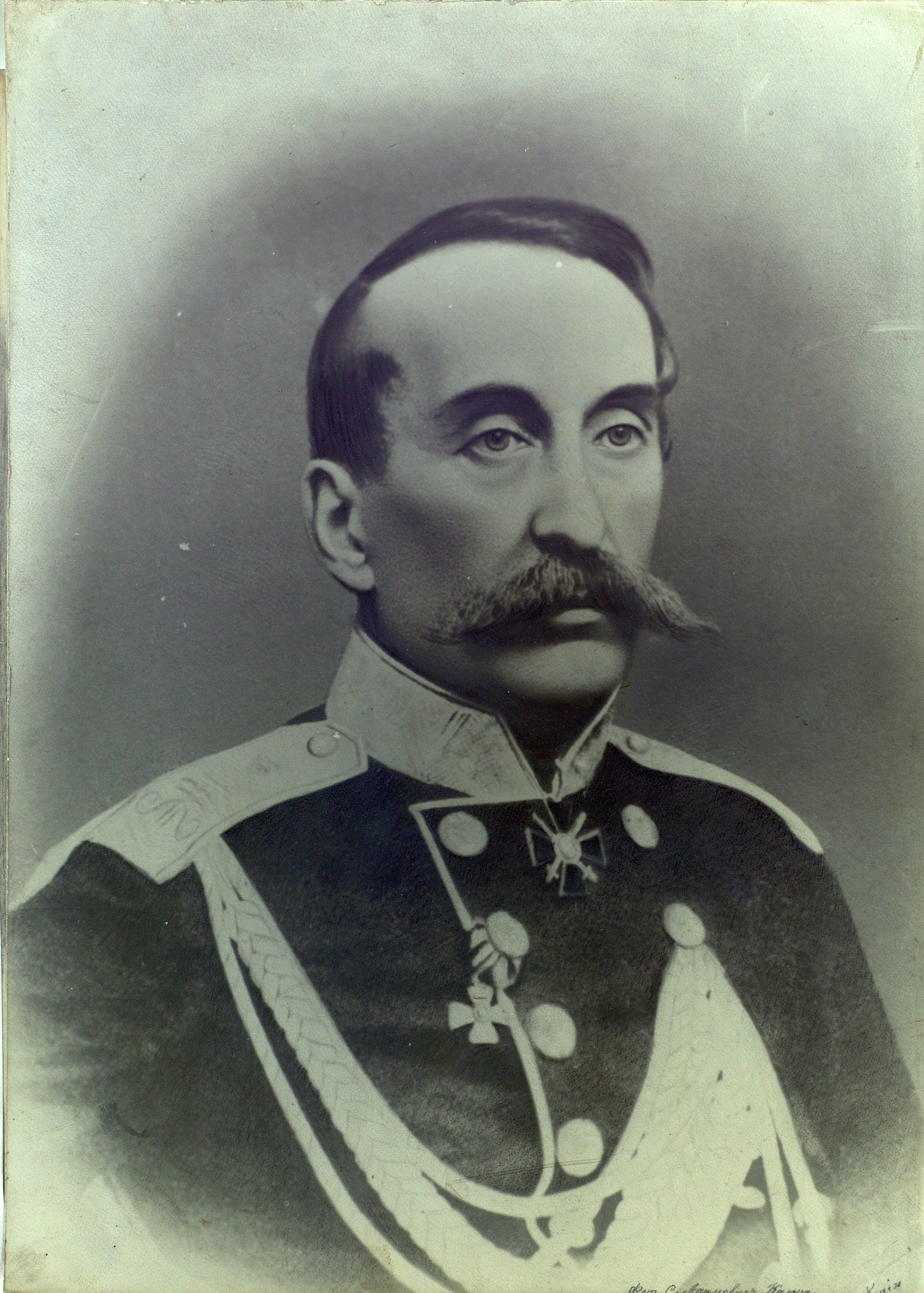
- Born: 19 July 1802; Saint Petersburg, Russian Empire
- Died: 12 March 1874 (aged 71)
- Military career
- Allegiance: Russian Empire
- Branch: (Russian Empire) Imperial Russian Army
- Service years: 1819–1840
- Rank: Lieutenant general
- Conflicts: Russo-Persian War; Russo-Turkish War; November Uprising; Crimean War
- Awards: Order of St. George; Order of St. Vladimir; Gold Sword for Bravery; Order of St. Alexander Nevsky

Count Yegor Petrovich Tolstoy Russian: Граф Егор Петрович Толстой; 19 July 1802 – 12 March 1874) was an Imperial Russian lieutenant-general, senator, and governor of Taganrog, Kaluga, and Penza.

== Military career ==
Son of Pyotr Aleksandrovich Tolstoy, Yegor Tolstoy was born on 9 July 1802 (Old Style) in the Tolstoy family. He received home education and in 1819 enrolled to serve in the Uglitsk regiment. In 1821, he was transferred into the regiment of chasseurs of the Leib Guards. Tolstoy was aide-de-camp to general Alexander von Neidgart, and was stationed in Laibach (Ljubljana) during the Congress, where he was appointed head of the Russian headquarters of the detachment against Piedmont. In 1826, Count Tolstoy participated in the Russo-Persian War, 1826–1828, serving as aide de camp to Mayor-General Prince Aleksandr Sergeyevich Menshikov. On 21 April 1827 Tolstoy was appointed aide de camp to the Emperor Nicholas I of Russia. During the campaign of Russo-Turkish War, 1828–1829, he was awarded with an Order of St. George of the 4th degree and the rank of colonel for the action in the siege of Anapa. He was awarded with a golden sword for the restoration of the communication between the main army and the corps of general Loggin Rot in July of the same year; and was wounded in the head during the Siege of Varna. In 1831, Yegor Tolstoy participated in the military actions against Polish rebels during November Uprising and was awarded with an Order of St. Vladimir of the 3rd degree for the seizure of Warsaw.

== Government Work ==
In 1835 Count Tolstoy received an appointment at the Ministry of Interior and gave his resignation in 1840. In April 1851, he was appointed governor of Kaluga, and on 27 April 1854, governor-general of the city of Taganrog. Tolstoy held this office until September 1856 and participated in the defense of the city from bombardments and landing operations during the Siege of Taganrog in 1855. On 31 August 1859 he was appointed governor of Penza and on 4 August 1861, Russian senator. In 1870, Tolstoy was decorated with an Order of St. Alexander Nevsky for the 50 years of service. Count Yegor Tolstoy died on 12 March 1874.

== External links and references ==
- (in Russian) Governor Yegor Petrovich Tolstoy

Government offices
Preceded by Nikolay Adlerberg	Governors of Taganrog; 1854–1856	Succeeded by Mikhail Lavrov
