= Dmitry Petrovich Maksutov =

Russian naval officer

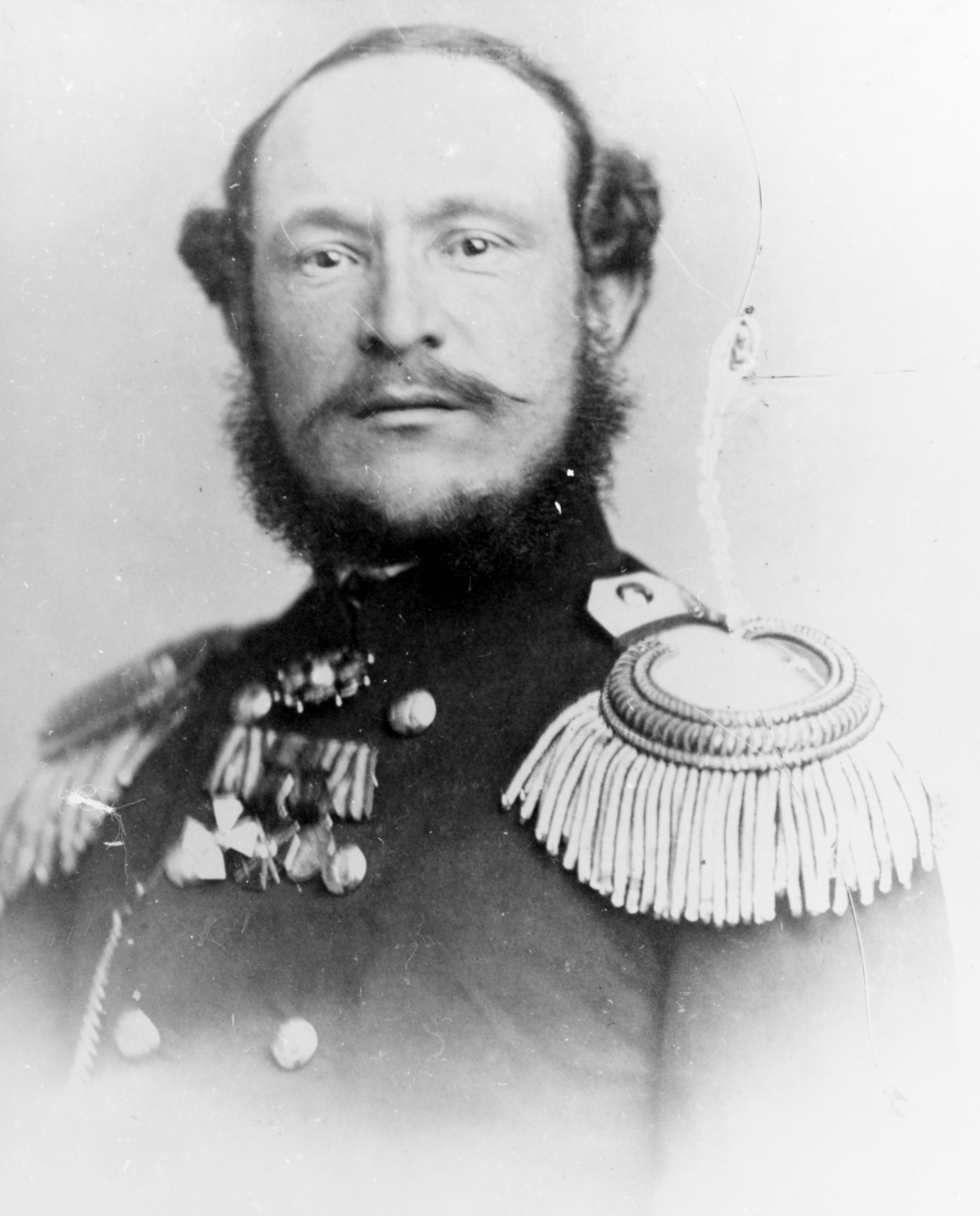
Maksutov c. 1860s

Prince Dmitry Petrovich Maksutov (Russian: Дми́трий Петро́вич Максу́тов, May 10, 1832 – March 21, 1889) was an Imperial Russian Navy rear-admiral who was the last Governor of Russian America (1863–1867). He has streets dedicated to his memory in Sitka and Petropavlovsk-Kamchatsky.

Maksutov was born in the city of Perm. In 1840, he enrolled in Naval Cadets Corps, which he graduated in 1847 in the rank of naval cadet. Maksutov was promoted to the rank of lieutenant in March 1851, was assigned to the 46th division and left for the Russian Far East.

As the Crimean War broke out, he was transferred to Petropavlovsk in June 1854. Dmitry and his two brothers—Pavel and Alexander—took part in the war. Pavel Maksutov served in the Black Sea Fleet and was on board the battleship Paris during the Battle of Sinop, while Alexander and Dmitry took part in the defense of Petropavlovsk during the siege of Petropavlovsk. Dmitry Maksutov commanded the legendary cannon battery No. 2, while his brother Alexander commanded the battery No. 3. After the battle, both were awarded with the cross of Order of St. George of the 4th degree (posthumously for Alexander Maksutov).

In 1859, Prince Dmitry Maksutov came to Russian America to work for the Russian-American Company. At the beginning he was Assistant to the Governor Johan Hampus Furuhjelm, whom he succeeded at the helm of the company in March 1864. After the Alaska Purchase, the Russian Imperial flag was lowered, and the Star-Spangled Banner was raised on October 6, 1867. Maksutov was Russian America's last governor. He stayed in what became renamed Alaska for one more year, serving as Russian consul in Sitka and was in charge of the emigration of remaining Russians.

In 1869, Maksutov turned over his duties to Fyodor Koskul and returned to Russia. He served at various commercial vessels and was promoted to the rank of counter-admiral on May 17, 1882 (the day of his resignation). He died in St. Petersburg on March 21, 1889, and was buried at Novodevichy Cemetery.

== In fiction ==
Prince Maksutov is a key character in Act I of the novel Forty-Ninth by Boris Pronsky and Craig Britton.

== See also ==
- Dmitri Dmitrievich Maksutov
- Pavel Maksutov

Government offices
| Preceded by Johan Hampus Furuhjelm | Governor of Russian Colonies in America; 1864—1867 | Succeeded by Jefferson C. Davis as United States Military Commander of Alaska |
