= Achilles Alferaki =

Russian composer (1846–1919)

- Ахиллес Алфераки; Αχιλλέας Αλφεράκης
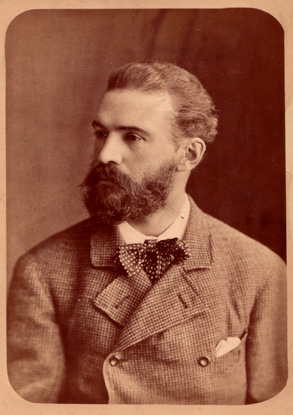
- Alferaki in 1882
- Born: 3 July 1846; Kharkov, Russian Empire
- Died: 27 December 1919 (aged 73); Petrograd, Russia
- Occupations: Composer; politician

Achilles (Note: Sometimes spelled Akhilles or Ahilles.) Nikolayevich Alferaki (Russian: Ахиллес Николаевич Алфераки; 3 July 1846 – 27 December 1919) was a Russian composer and politician of Greek descent. His brother was Sergei Alphéraky. He served as the mayor of Taganrog from 1880 to 1888.

== Biography ==
Alferaki was born in Kharkov in the Russian Empire (present-day Ukraine), to Nikos and Maria Alferakis. He spent his childhood in Taganrog, present-day Rostov Oblast, in the Alferaki Palace on Catholic Street (now Frunze Street) designed by the architect Andrei Stackenschneider.

Alferaki was educated at home before attending the historical and philological faculty at Moscow University. There he also studied music theory. In 1870, he returned to Taganrog due to family matters. In 1873, following the death of Lev Kulchitsky, the governor of Taganrog, Alferaki briefly served as acting governor. Between 1880 and 1888, he served as mayor of Taganrog. He then moved to Saint Petersburg. There, he became the chancellor of the Ministry of Internal Affairs in 1891 and later the director of the Russian Telegraph Agency.

Alferaki died in Petrograd (Saint Petersburg) in 1919. One of his family's descendants was Anna Marly, a Russian-born French singer and songwriter, author of Chant des Partisans and a Chevalier of the Légion d'Honneur.

== Mayor of Taganrog ==
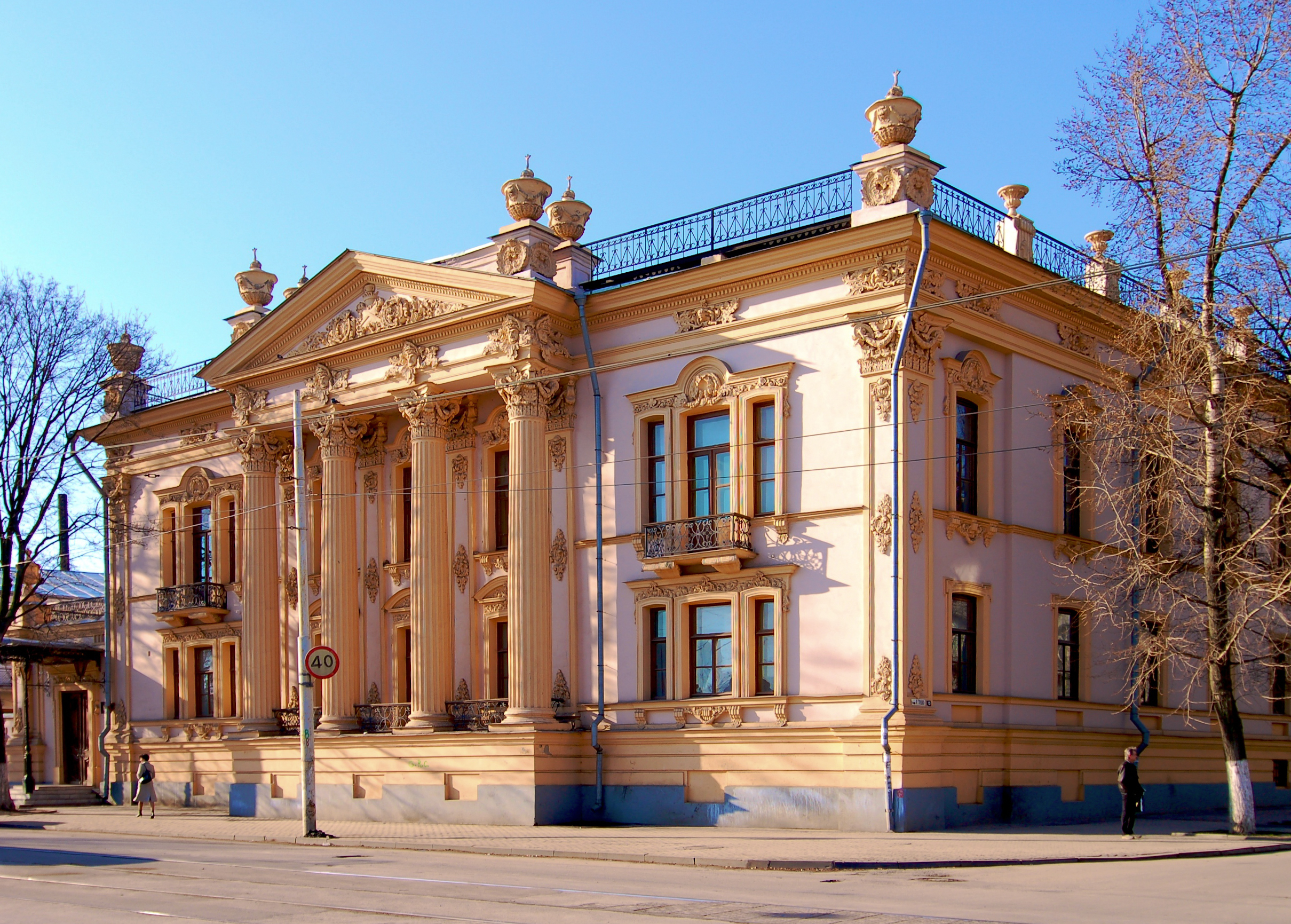
The Alferaki Palace in Taganrog.

In 1880, Alferaki was elected Mayor (городской голова) of Taganrog. During his tenure, he made a number of useful contributions to the city's infrastructure, social services and the arts. He sought to clean and beautify Taganrog and participated in establishing different charitable institutions. During his time as mayor period of office, the city's streets were paved with cobblestones, trees were planted along the pavements, and the first boulevards were built. Mayor Alferaki contributed to the establishment of The Society for the Relief of the Aged Poor, established in 1883, and to the development of an elementary education system in the city. His proposals to erect a monument to Peter I The Great and for a major reconstruction of Taganrog's harbour were realised.

== Music and art ==
Alferaki was a music lover. He took part in the activities of Taganrog's Music and Dramatic Society. A symphony orchestra, directed by composer and conductor Václav Suk, was established in Taganrog. Alferaki helped Taganrog become known as a music-loving city. Alferaki devoted much of his time to music. While in St Petersburg, he wrote more than 100 romances, compositions and two operas St. John's Eve and The Earl King.

Achilles Alferaki was also a talented artist. A large collection of his caricatures is now kept at the Taganrog Museum of Local Lore and History and at the Literary Museum named after Chekhov. His sketches and drawings capture some of the individuals who lived in Taganrog in the late 19th-century.

== See also ==
- Alferaki Palace
- Sergei Alphéraky

== Sources ==
- Таганрог. Энциклопедия, Таганрог, издательство АНТОН, 2008

Government offices
Preceded by Lev Kultshitskiy	Governors of Taganrog; 1873	Succeeded by Johan Hampus Furuhjelm
