= House of Pioneers (Taganrog) =

- Дом Пионеров (Russian)
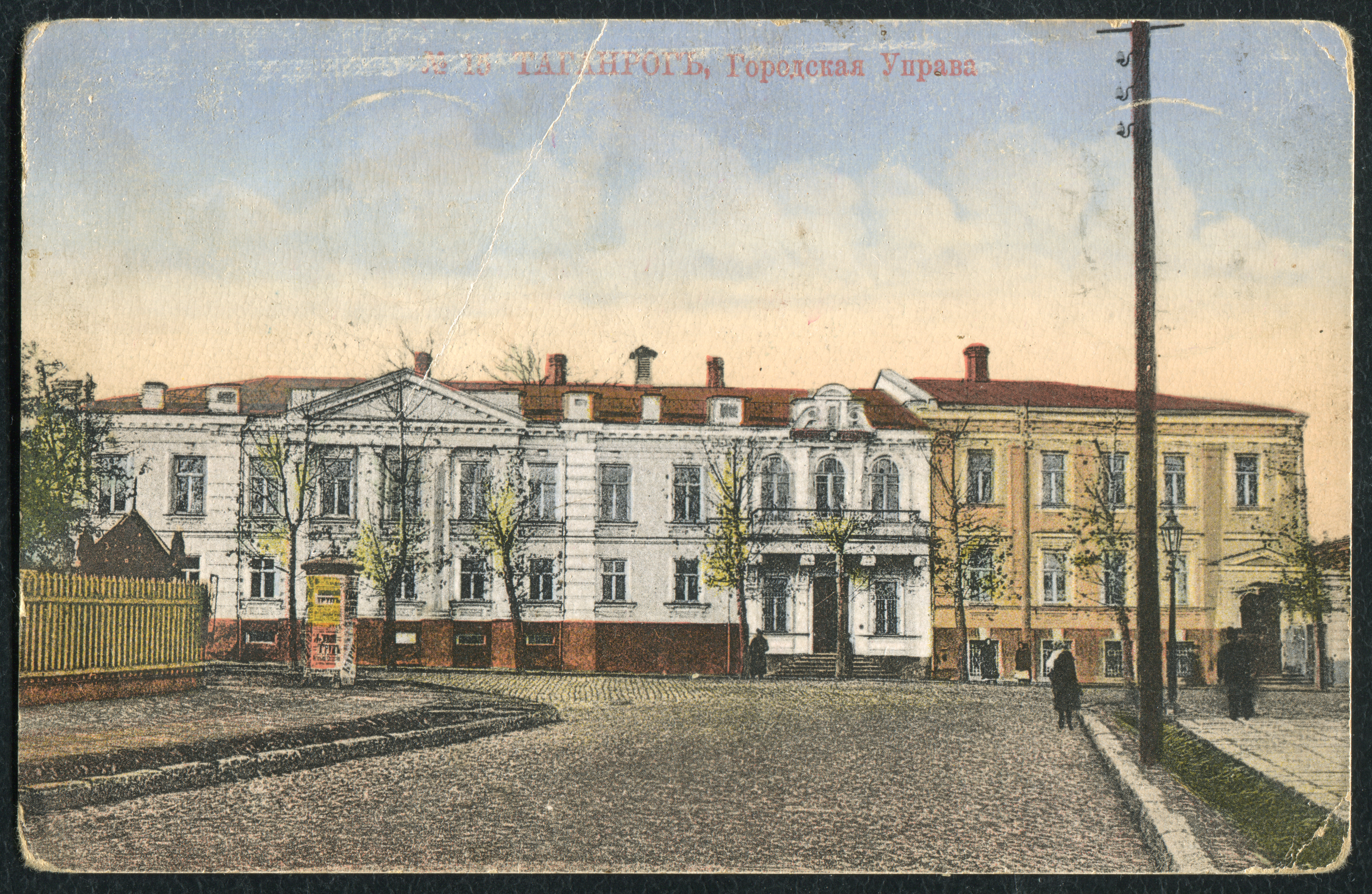
- city government
- Location: Taganrog, Rostov oblast Russia

History
- Built: 1943

The House of Pioneers (Taganrog) (Russian: Дом Пионеров) is a center for out-of-school-hours activities in Taganrog which existed before 1991.

== History ==
The pioneer organization in Taganrog was created on 9 April 1923 when in the building of the Taganrog labor school take place the meeting of the children's groups "Young Spartak".

The Palace of Pioneers and Schoolchildren was inaugurated in Taganrog on 24 January 1936 and became the first Palace of Pioneers in the Azov-Black Sea region and the fourth in the USSR. The director is M.A. Podolsky. Before the German occupation of the city on 17 October 1941 the Palace of Pioneers and Schoolchildren occupied the building of the former city government (Petrovskaya, 87). There were excellent conditions for diverse work with teenagers. All the industrial enterprises of the city participated in equipment the Palace. The chiefs helped create mirror choreographic classes, workshops with carpentry and lathes, radio clubs, young naturalist clubs. Under the leadership of teachers in 17 sections students engaged in the latest types of technical creativity: they collected radios, electromechanical televisions, created models of planes, studied maritime, and made furniture. The Taganrog young naturalists developed a hardiness wheat variety marked by the VDNKh Medal.

Since 1936 at the Palace of Pioneers was organized a children's brass band.

After the liberation of Taganrog from the occupants the Palace of Pioneers and Schoolchildren was opened on 3 December 1943 entitled "House of Pioneers" in the Teachers' House at the address: Petrovskaya, 89. In February 1944 the House of Pioneers was moved to the building of the Children's Music School of P. I. Tchaikovsky (50 Grecheskaya St.).

Until 1947 in a two-story mansion on the street Sverdlov, 60 located the Club of the Dimitrov Plant. From 1947 to 1949 in this building was the Theater of Musical Comedy. After its disbandment in winter of 1949 the building was passed to the city House of Pioneers.

In 1957 at the House of Pioneers began to operate a music studio, was established a children's musical theater "Fairy Tale".

In 1968, there were 25 studios and clubs in the House of Pioneers in which about 500 children were engaged. In addition to radio and photo-clubs, dramatic, choreographic, musical, there was also a club of regional studies [5].

Since 1988, the House of Pioneers worked in the building on the street Petrovskaya, 72. In 1999 the Taganrog Pioneers' House was transformed into an institution for additional education for children The Center for Extracurricular Activities (CEA). Director is T. V. Yanchenko.

== Directors of the House of Pioneers ==
- 1974 - 1986 — T.S. Begun
- 1946 - 1974 — A.P. Brintseva
- 1943 - 1946 — T.M. Ulyanokh
- 1938 - 1941 — E. I. Akulenko
- 1936 - 1938 — M.A. Podolsky

== Famous employees of the House of Pioneers ==
- Bekker, Nina Mikhailovna (1890-1938) - head of the modeling club.
- Brintseva, Antonina Petrovna (1912-1998) - Director of the House of Pioneers, a member of the Taganrog resistance movement, a participant of the Great Patriotic War, The Excellence in Public Education Award of the RSFSR.
- Bout, Nikolai Yakovlevich (1928-1989) - National Artist of the RSFSR, laureate of the State Prize of the Ukrainian SSR Shevchenko for the diorama "Battle for the Dnieper", one of the leading masters of the Military Art Studio of B.M. Grekov.
- Weiss, Sergey Aleksandrovich (1923-1943) - the head of the aircraft model circle, a member of the Taganrog anti-fascist underground organization.
- Grigorieva, Valentina Yakovlevna (1904-2000) - head of the art studio.
- Deribery, Ivan Grigorievich (1923) - a club artist, a Russian artist.
- Drozdova, Olga Kupriyanovna (1944) - a club master, honored teacher of the Russian Federation, director of the Mariinskaya Gymnasium.
- Malinka, Victor Alexandrovich (1935) - a club artist, a Russian-Ukrainian artist, illustrator of a children's book.
- Morozov, Semyon Grigorievich (1914-1943) - Commissar of the Taganrog underground anti-fascist organization, Hero of the Soviet Union.
- Skarainis, Oleg Yulievich (1923) - a circle artist, a Soviet sculptor.
- Sukhoruchenko, Gennady Anatolyevich (1934-2000) - a circle artist, a Soviet poet.
