= 1947 in the Soviet Union =

- Decades: 1920s; 1930s; 1940s; 1950s; 1960s
- See also: History of the Soviet Union; List of years in the Soviet Union

The following lists events that happened during 1947 in the Union of Soviet Socialist Republics.

== Incumbents ==
- General Secretary of the Communist Party of the Soviet Union – Joseph Stalin
- Chairman of the Presidium of the Supreme Soviet of the Soviet Union – Nikolay Shvernik
- Chairman of the Council of Ministers of the Soviet Union – Joseph Stalin

== Births ==
- January 6 – Antonina Isaeva, Ukrainian milkmaid and politician
- January 8 – Igor Ivanov, Russian-born Canadian grandmaster (died 2005)
- February 19 – Lev Rubinstein, Russian poet and social activist (died 2024)
- February 21 – Victor Sokolov, Russian dissident journalist and priest (died 2006)
- October 12 – Zukhra Valeeva, Russian master builder

== Deaths ==
- August 9 – Seraphima Blonskaya

== See also ==
- 1947 in fine arts of the Soviet Union
- List of Soviet films of 1947
