= Maria Chekhova =

Founder of the Chekhov Memorial House (1863–1957)

- Мария Чехова
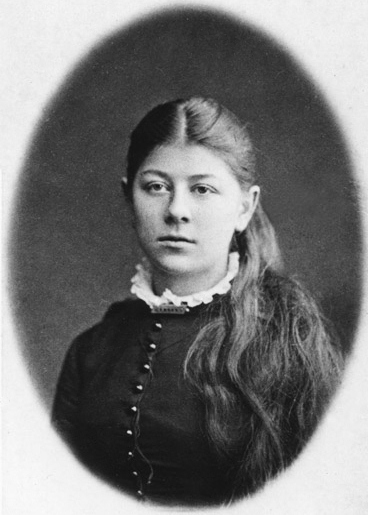
- Chekhova in 1882
- Born: 31 August 1863; Taganrog, Russian Empire
- Died: 15 January 1957 (aged 93); Yalta, Soviet Union
- Occupations: Teacher, artist
- Known for: Founder of the Chekhov Memorial House museum in Yalta
- Awards: Saint Stanislaus ribbon Order of the Red Banner of Labour

Maria Pavlovna Chekhova (Russian: Мари́я Па́вловна Че́хова) was a Russian teacher, artist, founder of the Chekhov Memorial House museum in Yalta, and a recipient of the Order of the Red Banner of Labour. Anton Chekhov was her brother.

== Biography ==
Maria Pavlovna Chekhova was born on 31 August 1863 in the city of Taganrog. She entered the Mariinskaya Girls' Gymnasium in 1872. After the family's bankruptcy in 1876, she moved with the family to Moscow where she graduated from the Filaretovski Eparkhial School for Women in 1884. From 1886 to 1904 she read lectures on history and geography in Rzhevskaya's private gymnasium for girls. In the 1890s she studied art at Stroganovka (also known as Stroganov Moscow State Academy of Arts and Industry). In 1903 she was the recipient of a gold medal on the Saint Stanislaus ribbon for assiduity in education.

After the death of Anton Chekhov, she dedicated her life to the collection and publication of the literary heritage of her brother. In 1914 Maria Chekhova donated the personal belongings of Anton Chekhov to the Chekhov Museum in Taganrog, and was present at the inauguration of the Chekhov Library designed by Chekhov's friend Fyodor Schechtel.

From 1922 to 1957 she was the director of the Chekhov Museum in Yalta.

In 1935 Maria Chekhova and Olga Knipper visited the birth city of Chekhov, Taganrog, to participate in the events commemorating the 75th anniversary of Anton Chekhov's birth. The former Boys Gymnasium (school no. 2) was named after Chekhov (Chekhov Gymnasium).

In 1944 the Soviet government awarded Maria Chekhova with the Order of the Red Banner of Labour for her many years of work at the Chekhov Museum in Yalta and for her contribution to the publication of Chekhov's literary heritage.
