= 1947 in fine arts of the Soviet Union =

The year 1947 was marked by many events that left an imprint on the history of Soviet and Russian fine arts.

== Events ==
- The Repin Institute of Arts graduated young artists Mikhail Anikushin, Igor Veselkin, Gavriil Glikman, Vera Kashutova, Alexander Koroviakov, Vera Lubimova, Evsey Moiseenko, Pen Varlen, Stepan Privedentsev, Vasily Stamov, Elena Tabakova, Vladimir Uspensky, Alexander Kharshak, Lubov Kholina, and others.
- The All-Russian Academy of Arts was converted into the Academy of Arts of the USSR. First president of the Academy of Arts of the USSR was painter Aleksandr Gerasimov, head of the academy until 1957.
- Exhibition of works by Kuzma Petrov-Vodkin was opened in the Leningrad Union of Artists. Over 200 works of artist were exhibited.
- Exhibition of works by Nikolai Akimov was opened in the Leningrad Union of Artists. Over 800 works of artist were exhibited.
- First solo exhibition of works by Nikolai Timkov was opened in the Leningrad Union of Artists.
- Exhibition of works of Leningrad artists was opened in the Leningrad Union of Artists. Over 450 works of 194 artists were exhibited. Among them were Taisia Afonina, Vladimir Gorb, Sergei Zakharov, Maria Zubreeva, Nikolai Kostrov, Anna Kostrova, Alexander Lubimov, Mikhail Natarevich, Samuil Nevelshtein, Yuri Neprintsev, Sergei Osipov, Viacheslav Pakulin, Gleb Savinov, Alexander Samokhvalov, Nikolai Timkov, Alexander Troshichev, Rudolf Frentz, Leonid Khudiakov, Nadezhda Shteinmiller, and other important Leningrad artists.
- November 5 — All-Union Fine Art Exhibition of 1947 was opened in Pushkin Museum in Moscow. The participants were Mikhail Avilov, Mikhail Bobyshov, Olga Bogaevskaya, Alexander Bubnov, Piotr Buchkin, Piotr Vasiliev, Aleksandr Gerasimov, Sergey Gerasimov, Gavriil Gorelov, Igor Grabar, Aleksei Gritsai, Aleksandr Deyneka, Krum Dzhakov, Nikolai Dormidontov, Vasily Yefanov, Boris Efimov, Boris Ioganson, Lev Kerbel, Sergei Konenkov, Yuri Kugach, Samuil Nevelshtein, Yuri Neprintsev, Victor Oreshnikov, Genrikh Pavlovsky, Viacheslav Pakulin, Gleb Savinov, Alexander Samokhvalov, Rudolf Frentz, and other important Soviet artists.

== Deaths ==
- January 4 — Piotr Petrovichev (Russian: Петровичев Пётр Иванович), Russian soviet landscape painter (born 1874).
- August 9 — Seraphima Blonskaya (Russian: Блонская Серафима Иасоновна), Russian painter (born 1870).
- December 1 — Piotr Williams (Russian: Вильямс Пётр Владимирович), Russian soviet painter and theatre artist, Honored Arts Worker of the RSFSR, Stalin Prize winner (born 1902).
- December 13 — Nicholas Roerich (Russian: Николай Константинович Рерих), Russian painter, writer, archaeologist, theosophist, philosopher, and public figure (born 1874).
- December 14 — Ivan Vladimirov (Russian: Владимиров Иван Алексеевич), Russian soviet painter and graphic artist (born 1869).

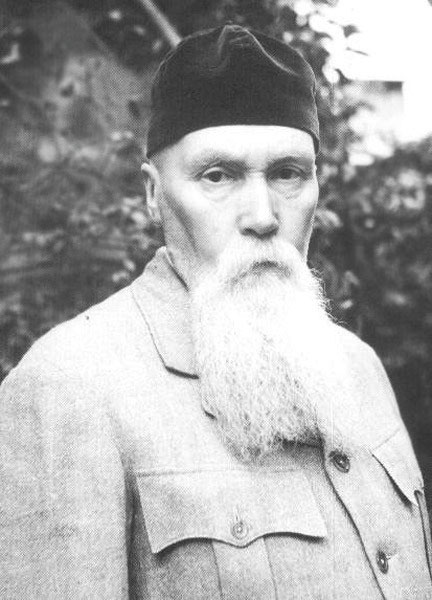
Nicholas Roerich

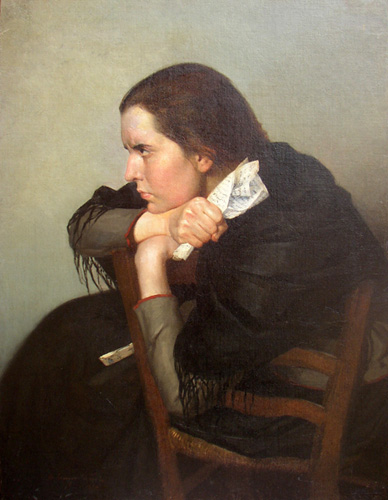
S. Blonskaya

== See also ==
- List of Russian artists
- List of painters of Leningrad Union of Artists
- Saint Petersburg Union of Artists
- Russian culture
- 1947 in the Soviet Union

== Sources ==
- Выставка произведений ленинградских художников. 1947 год. Живопись. Скульптура. Графика. Театрально-декорационная живопись. Каталог. Л., ЛССХ, 1948.
- Бойков В. Изобразительное искусство Ленинграда. Заметки о выставке ленинградских художников // Ленинградская правда, 1947, 29 ноября.
- Каталог весенней выставки произведений московских живописцев и скульпторов. М., МССХ, 1947.
- Москва в произведениях художников. 1147-1947 годы. Живопись. Скульптура. Графика. Каталог выставки. М., ГМИИ, 1947.
- Всесоюзная художественная выставка 1947 года. Живопись. Скульптура. Графика. Каталог. М-Л., Комитет по делам искусств при Совете Министров СССР, 1947.
- Artists of Peoples of the USSR. Biobibliography Dictionary. Vol. 1. Moscow, Iskusstvo, 1970.
- Artists of Peoples of the USSR. Biobibliography Dictionary. Vol. 2. Moscow, Iskusstvo, 1972.
- Directory of Members of Union of Artists of USSR. Volume 1,2. Moscow, Soviet Artist Edition, 1979.
- Directory of Members of the Leningrad branch of the Union of Artists of Russian Federation. Leningrad, Khudozhnik RSFSR, 1980.
- Artists of Peoples of the USSR. Biobibliography Dictionary. Vol. 4 Book 1. Moscow, Iskusstvo, 1983.
- Directory of Members of the Leningrad branch of the Union of Artists of Russian Federation. - Leningrad: Khudozhnik RSFSR, 1987.
- Персональные и групповые выставки советских художников. 1917-1947 гг. М., Советский художник, 1989.
- Artists of peoples of the USSR. Biobibliography Dictionary. Vol. 4 Book 2. - Saint Petersburg: Academic project humanitarian agency, 1995.
- Link of Times: 1932 - 1997. Artists - Members of Saint Petersburg Union of Artists of Russia. Exhibition catalogue. - Saint Petersburg: Manezh Central Exhibition Hall, 1997.
- Matthew C. Bown. Dictionary of 20th Century Russian and Soviet Painters 1900-1980s. - London: Izomar, 1998.
- Vern G. Swanson. Soviet Impressionism. - Woodbridge, England: Antique Collectors' Club, 2001.
- Время перемен. Искусство 1960—1985 в Советском Союзе. СПб., Государственный Русский музей, 2006.
- Sergei V. Ivanov. Unknown Socialist Realism. The Leningrad School. - Saint-Petersburg: NP-Print Edition, 2007. - ISBN 5-901724-21-6, ISBN 978-5-901724-21-7.
- Anniversary Directory graduates of Saint Petersburg State Academic Institute of Painting, Sculpture, and Architecture named after Ilya Repin, Russian Academy of Arts. 1915 - 2005. - Saint Petersburg: Pervotsvet Publishing House, 2007.
