= Chekhov Library =

Library in Taganrog, Russia

Coordinates: 47.2167°N 38.9276°E

The Central Municipal Public Library named after Anton Chekhov
- Центральная городская публичная библиотека имени А.П.Чехова
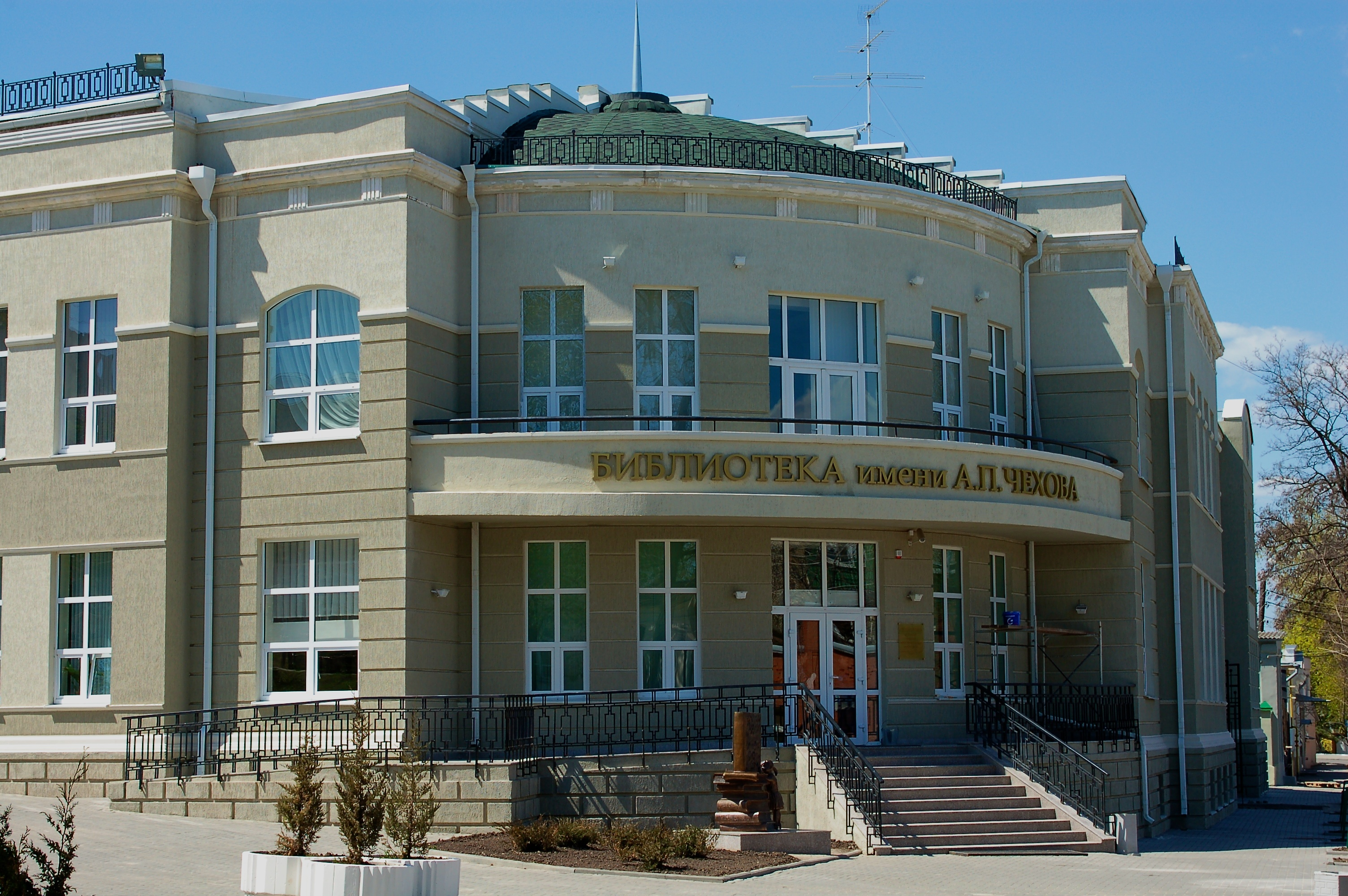
- The Chekhov Library inaugurated in January 2010
- Location: Ulitsa Petrovskaya 96, Taganrog, Rostov Oblast, Russia
- Type: Public library
- Established: 1876
- Branches: 14

Collection
- Size: 1.34M

Access and use
- Circulation: 1.6M
- Population served: Taganrog
- Members: 76,000

Other information
- Director: Mrs.Tatyana Alexeevna Mikheeva (Russian: Михеева Татьяна Алексеевна)
- Website: www.taglib.ru

Chekhov Library in Taganrog (full name The Central Municipal Public Library named after Anton Chekhov, Russian: Центральная городская публичная библиотека имени А.П.Чехова) is the oldest library in the South of Russia.

== Foundation history ==
The public library along with a small bookstore were officially inaugurated on 23 May 1876 by the Governor of Taganrog Admiral Johan Hampus Furuhjelm. In March 1878 the Public Library moved into another building granted by the City Council on Petrovskaya Street.

== School years of Anton Chekhov ==
Among the first subscribers were the writer Anton Chekhov, historian Pavel Filevsky, Vladimir Bogoraz, artists Seraphima Blonskaya and Dmitri Sinodi-Popov.

== Books from Chekhov the writer ==
In 1890 mayor of Taganrog Konstantin Foti asked Chekhov to send his books with author's dedications to the Taganrog Public Library.

== The Chekhov Library and Museum ==
In 1904, following Chekhov's death, the library was named after the playwright and short-story writer. The music department of the library is located at the historical Tchaikovsky House in Taganrog.

== Gallery ==
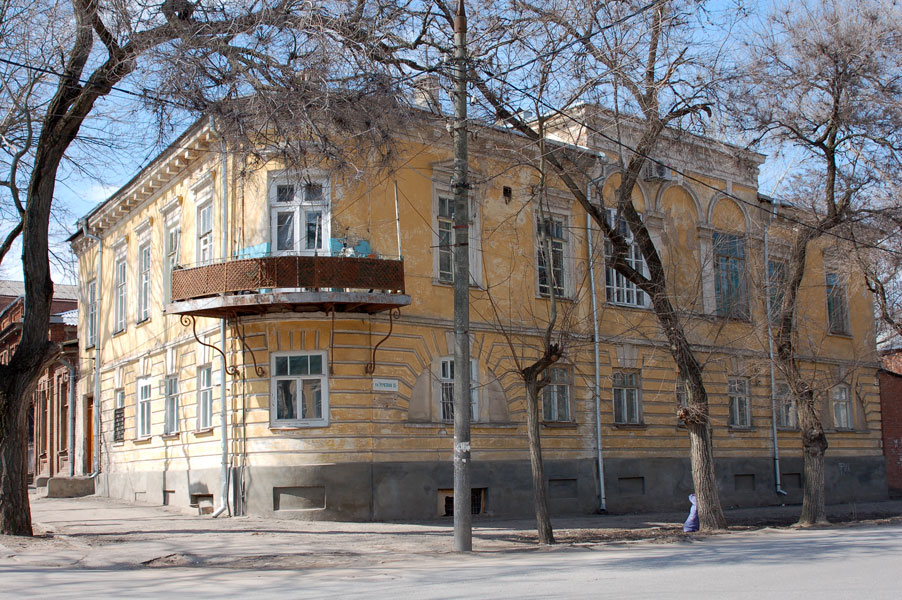
The old City Hall, home to the City Public Library in 1876–1877, photo taken in 2006.

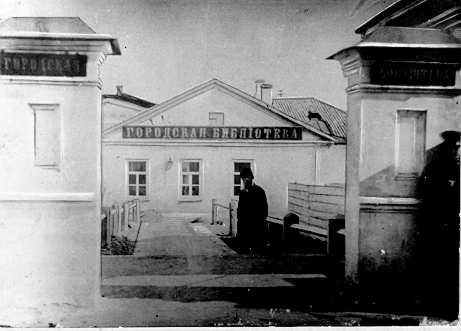
Taganrog public library, between 1878 and 1910.

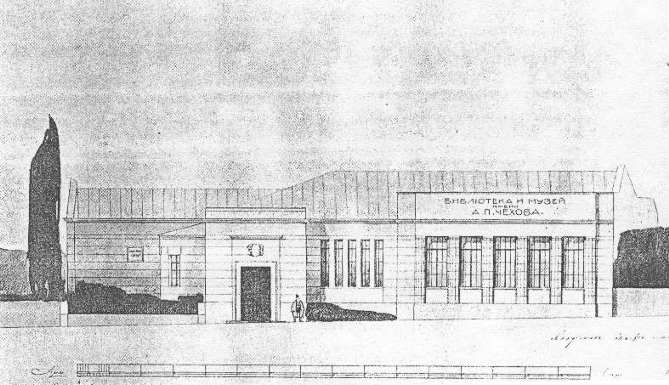
The project of the Chekhov Library & Museum in Taganrog designed by the architect Fyodor Schechtel (1911)

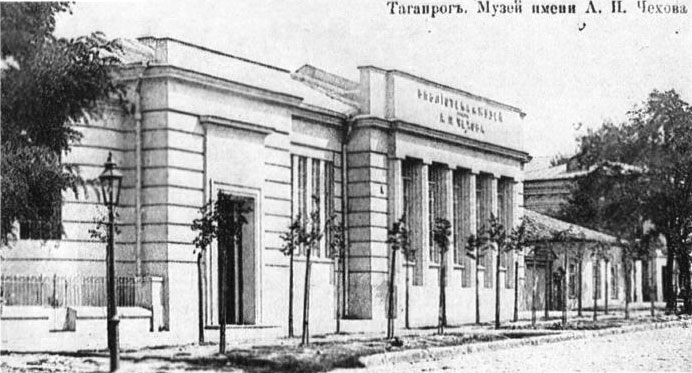
Chekhov Library & Museum on an old postcard (photo taken between 1911 and 1917).

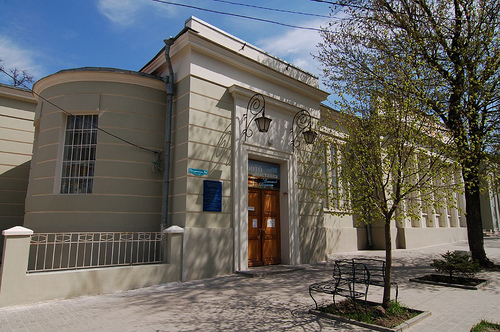
The Chekhov Library until 2008.

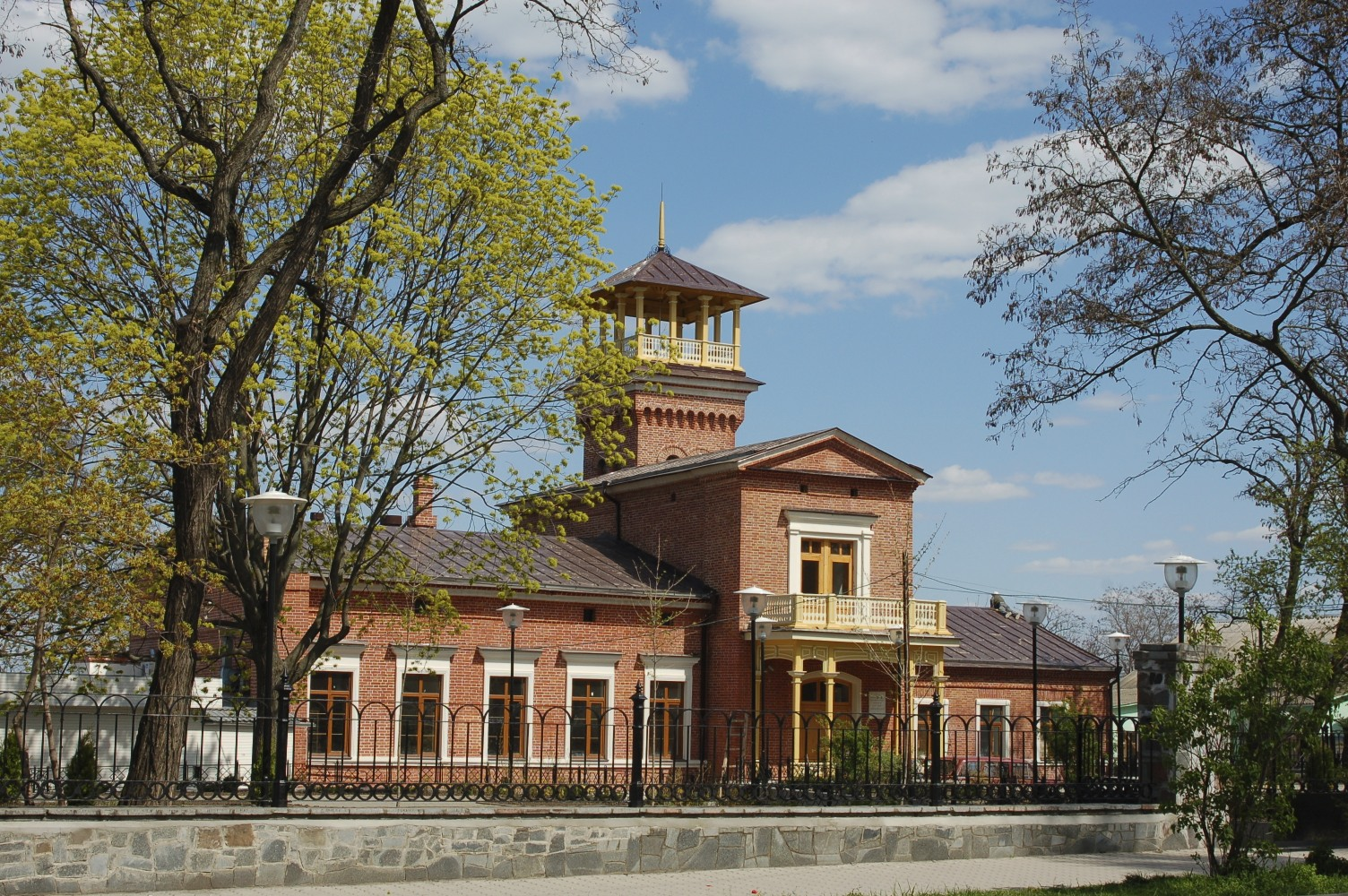
Tchaikovsky House in Taganrog used as Foreign & Music Dept. of Chekhov Library. Photographed in 2010.

== See also ==
- List of libraries in Russia
