= Angel-Warrior Monument =

Monument in Raganrog, Rostov, Russia

- Russian: Памятник Ангел-воин
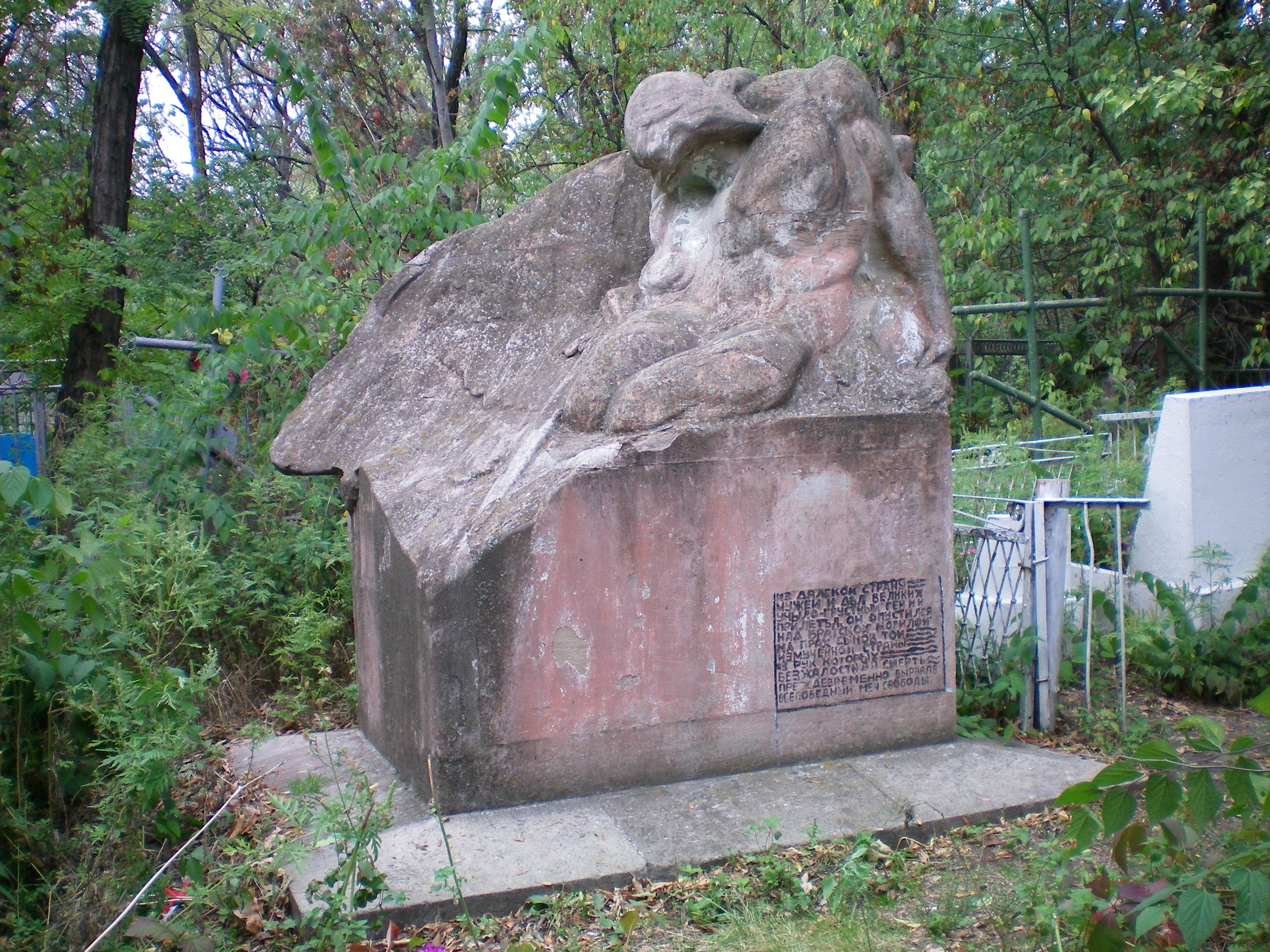
- Interactive map of Angel-Warrior Monument
- Location: Taganrog, Rostov Oblast, Russia
- Coordinates: 47.2073°N 38.9024°E
- Designer: J. Navrat
- Opening date: 1927

Angel-Warrior Monument (Russian: Памятник Ангел-воин) is a monument dedicated to Czechs and Slovaks who were taken prisoner during World War I and the Russian Civil War. It is situated in the city of Taganrog, Rostov Oblast, Russia at Taganrog Old Cemetery.

== Description ==
In 1918, 1700 Czechs and Slovaks who were captured during the First World War worked at the Russian-Baltic Plant (Combine Plant, JSC) in Taganrog. A large number of these workers died during the Civil War, fighting on the side of the Bolsheviks. To honor their memory, in 1927, a monument made of red sandstone and designed by J. Navrat was erected. Above the gravestone, there is a sculpture of an angel warrior. One of his wings is broken, and with the other one he tries to cover the grave of his fallen comrades. The sculptor wanted to express pride in those who died in battle. The half-figure of the angel is a testament to the sculptor's desire to create a memorable and distinguished monument.

The following inscription, in Russian and Czech, is engraved on the pedestal:

From a distant country of great men and deeds, a sad genius has arrived. He landed on the mass grave where lay the ashes of the sons of that tormented country. Pitiless death ruthlessly tore the all-conquering sword of Freedom from their hands.

This text, written in the style of revolutionary Romanticism, however, has only been partially preserved. The fragment of the angel-warrior's head is lost: soft sandstone slowly collapses when snow melts after winter. The monument was temporarily preserved with cement milk, but this distorted its colors. urgent restoration work is needed.

As of 2009, almost nothing remained of the outer layer, so the monument was painted by enthusiasts with façade paint in a pink-beige color. In 2010 and subsequent years it was repainted in white. In the spring of 2016, on the site of the Russian part of the epitaph, a black marble slab was installed with a replica of the text.
