= Isayev =

Isayev may refer to:

- Isayev (surname)
- Isaev (crater), a lunar crater
- Isayev S-125, a Soviet surface-to-air missile system
- Isayev, name of several rural localities in Russia
