= Taganrog Museum of Art =

Art museum in Taganrog, Rostov, Russia

Coordinates: 47°12′44″N 38°55′17″E

- Таганрогский художественный музей
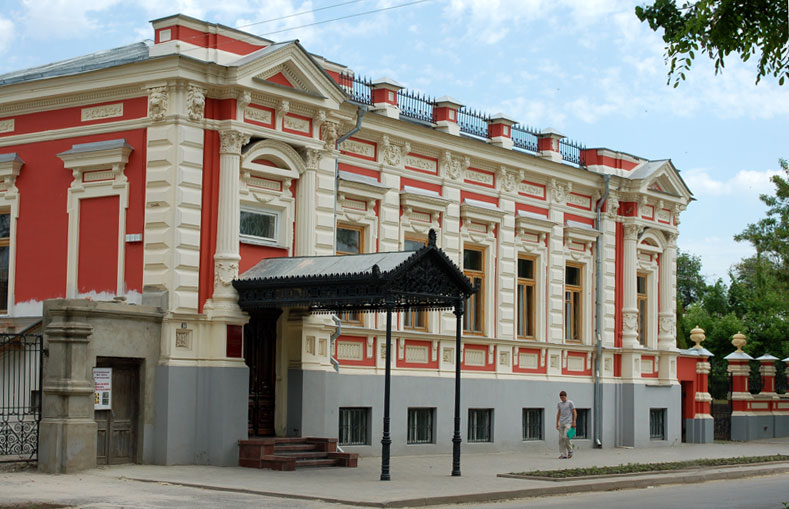
- Established: 1968
- Location: Alexandrovskaya street 56, Taganrog
- Type: Art museum
- Collection size: over 6000 works of art
- Directors: Tamara Fyodorovna Pugach; Пугач, Тамара Федоровна
- Public transit access: The October Plaza tram station
- Website: http://artmuseumtgn.ru/

Taganrog Museum of Art (Russian: Таганрогский художественный музей) was officially inaugurated in 1968, but the basis of the museum collection was formed by the end of the 19th century, when the art department of the Taganrog's city museum was established.

The most important part of the museum collection was formed in the Soviet Union time, and features two departments - Russian art before the Russian Revolution of 1917 and Soviet art.

The whole collection of art was looted from the museum during the Occupation of Taganrog in 1941–1943.

Since 1975, the museum of art is located at the former mansion of merchant Anton Handrin on Alexandrovskaya street 56.

== Exhibition ==
=== Russian art before 1917 ===
Among the paintings of this period exhibited at Taganrog Museum of Art are icons that date back to 17th and 18th centuries and paintings of the 18th and 19th centuries. The Realism (arts) of the late 19th century is represented with genre paintings and portraits by Konstantin Savitsky, Konstantin Makovsky, Henryk Siemiradzki, Nikolay Bogdanov-Belsky, Konstantin Makovsky and Vasily Maksimov, landscapes by Alexei Savrasov, Isaac Levitan and Arkhip Kuindzhi, sketches by Viktor Vasnetsov, Vasily Surikov and Vasili Vasilyevich Vereshchagin.

=== Soviet art ===
The Soviet art is represented with paintings by several generations of Soviet artists, including Igor Grabar, Aleksandr Gerasimov, Nikolai Petrovich Krymov, Vladimir Stozharov; sculptures by Yevgeny Vuchetich, Matvey Manizer; graphic art by Vladimir Favorsky, Yuri Neprintsev and Andrei Goncharov.

=== Monuments from the Taganrog Old Cemetery in the inner yard ===
Since 1976 many sepulchral monuments that represented special value as works of art were transferred from abandoned Taganrog Old Cemetery into the museum's inner yard, saving them from destruction.

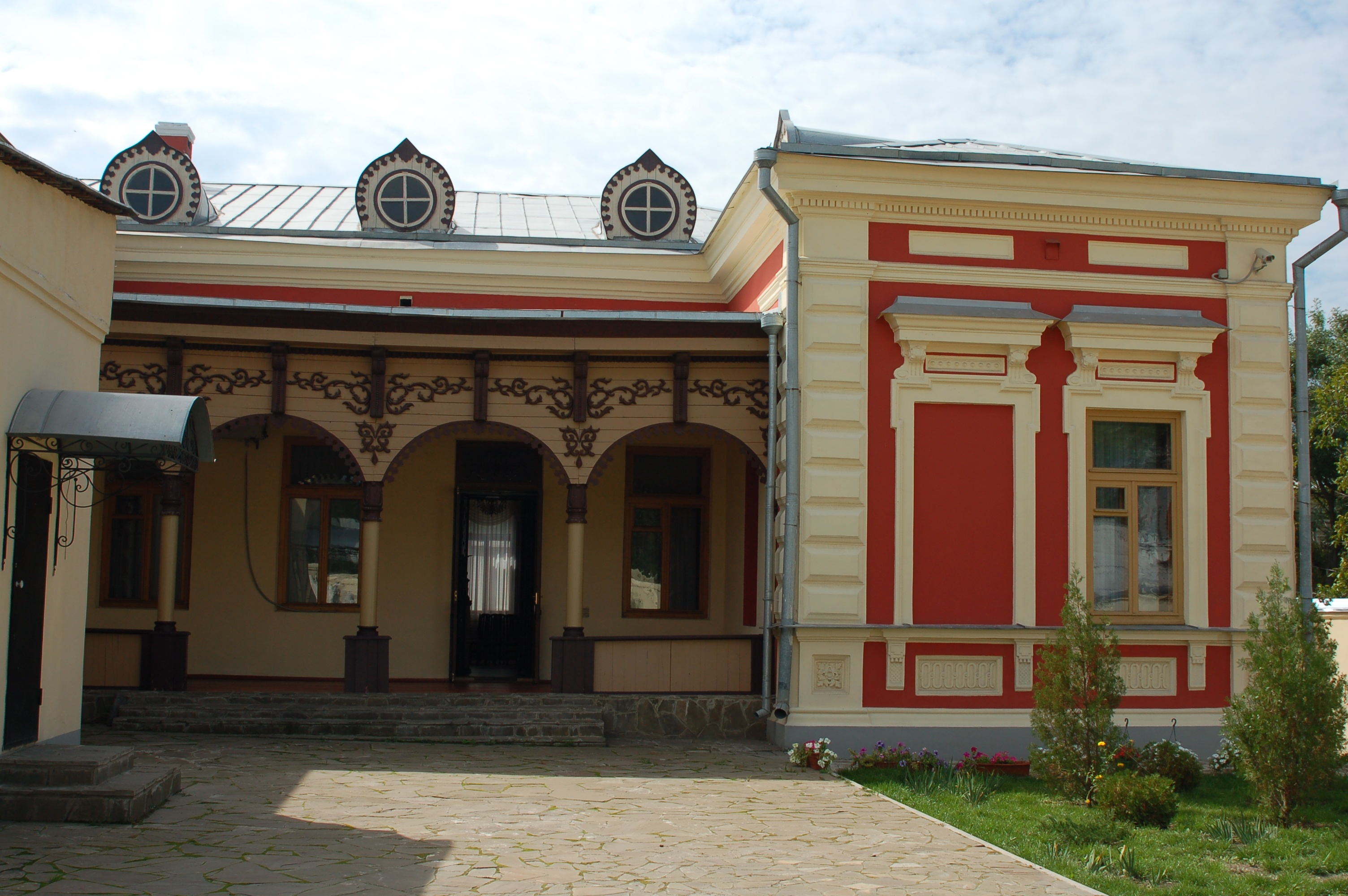
View on the museum's building from the inner yard

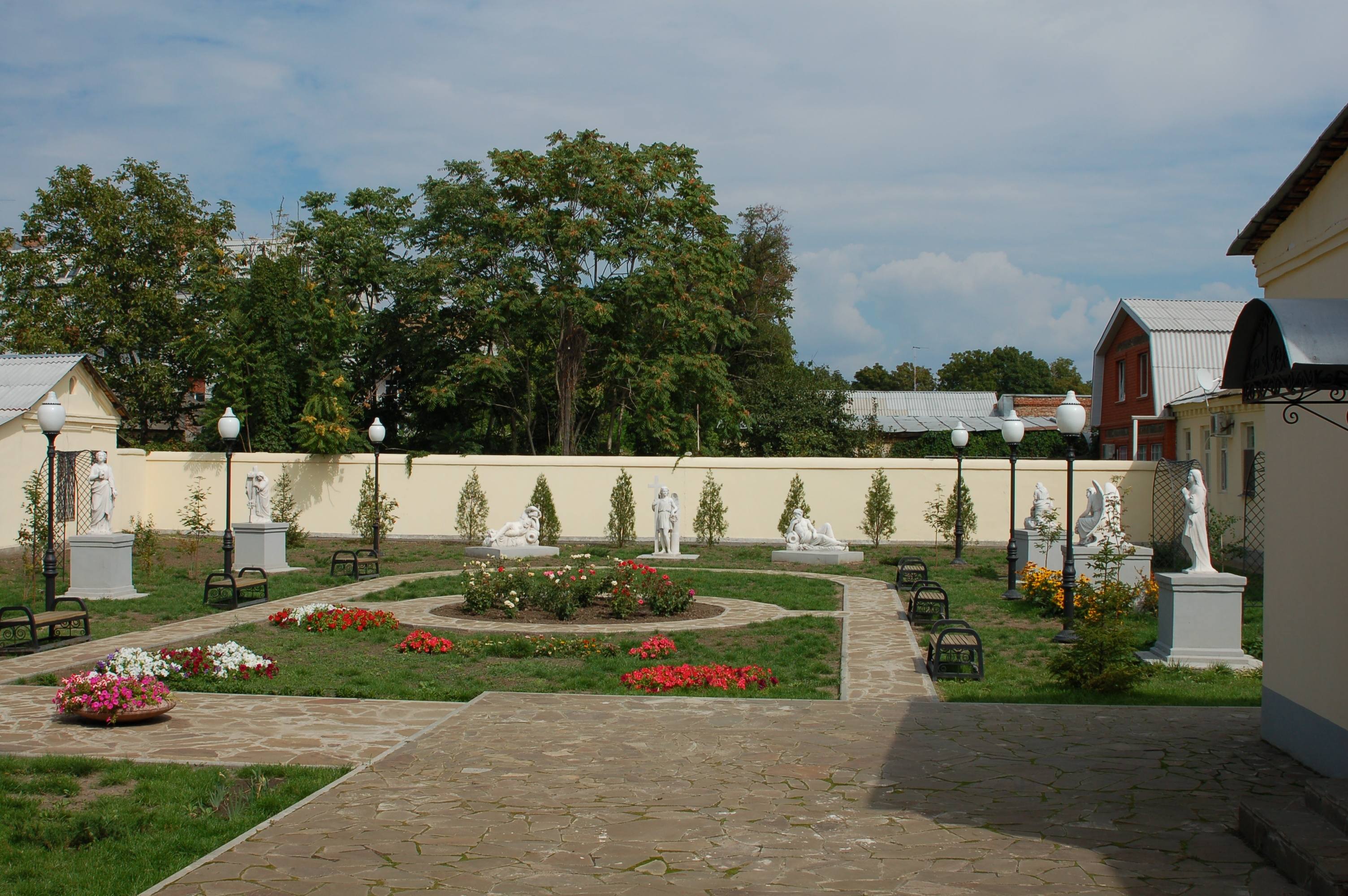
Sepulchral monuments in the museum's inner yard

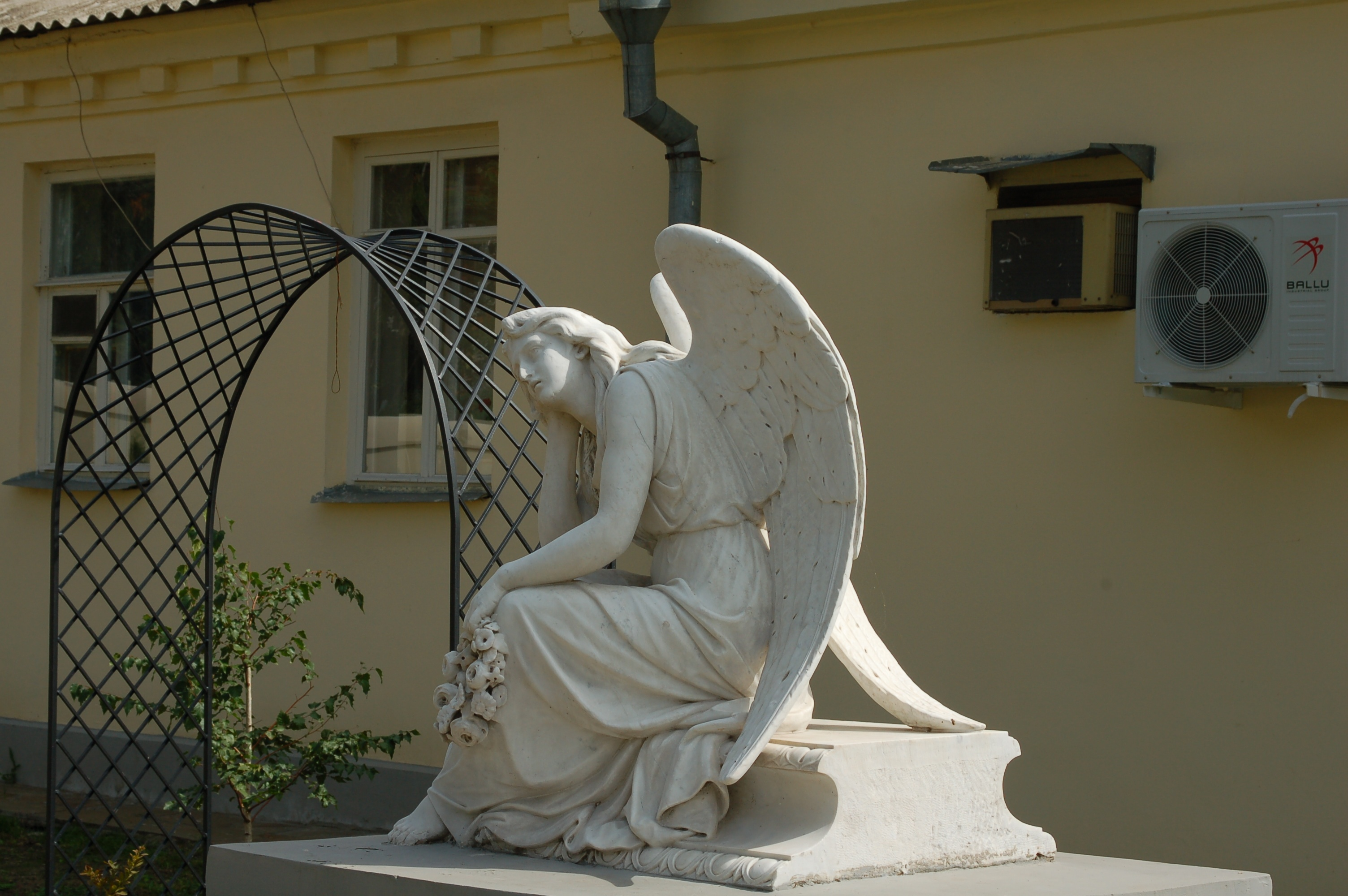
A sepulchral angel in the inner yard of the museum

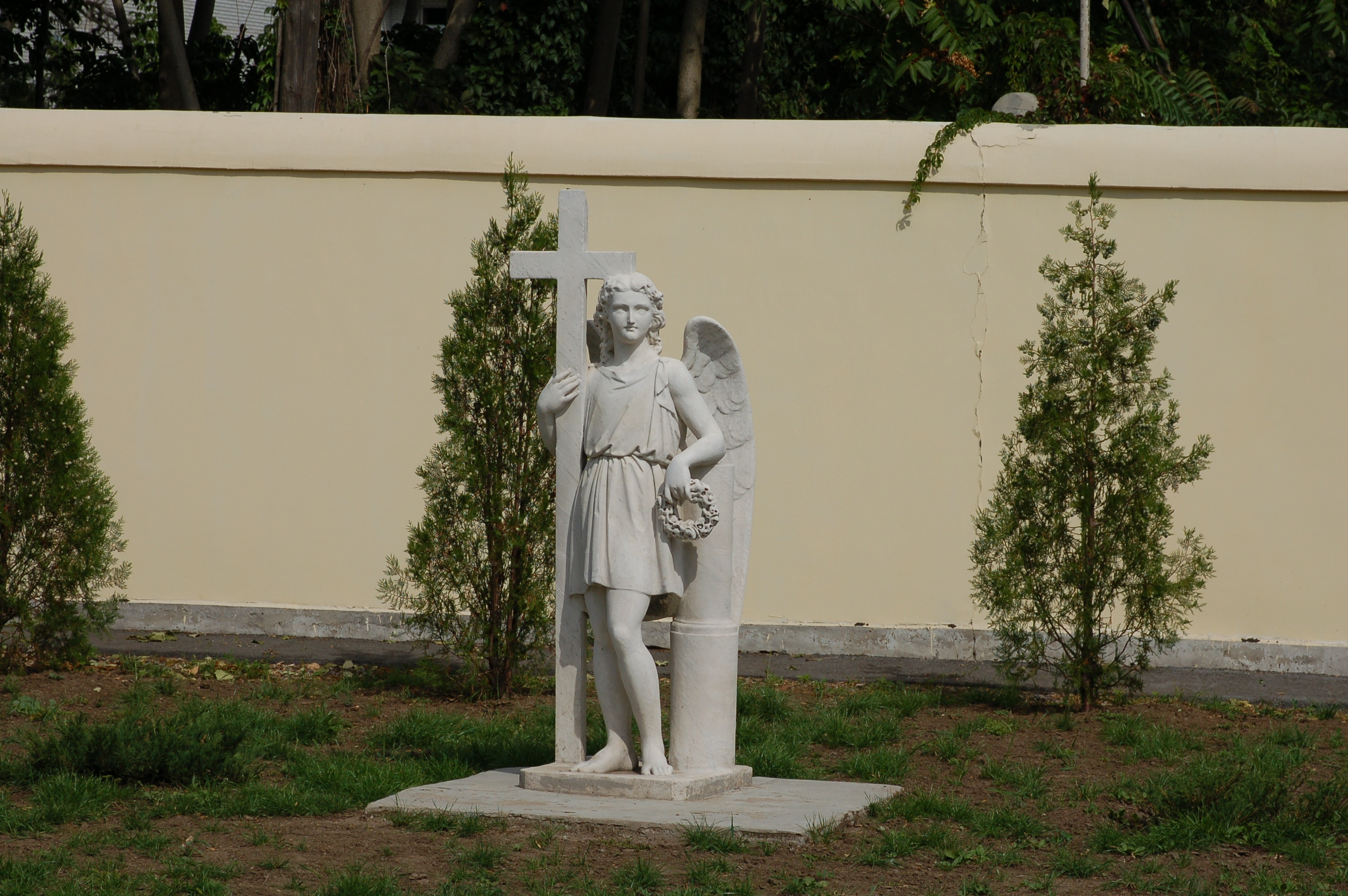
Sepulchral monument in the museum's inner yard

== Museum Collection ==
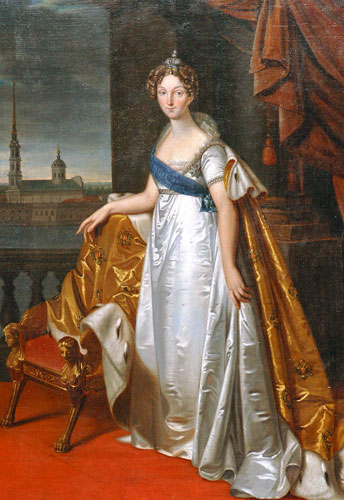
Princess Louise of Baden, also known as Yelizaveta Alexeevna, wife to Alexander I of Russia

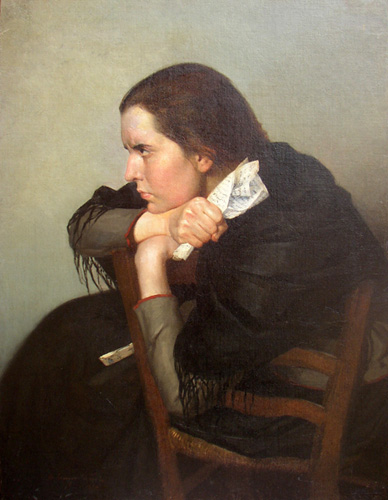
Portrait of the Artist Seraphima Blonskaya (1890) by Dmitri Sinodi-Popov.

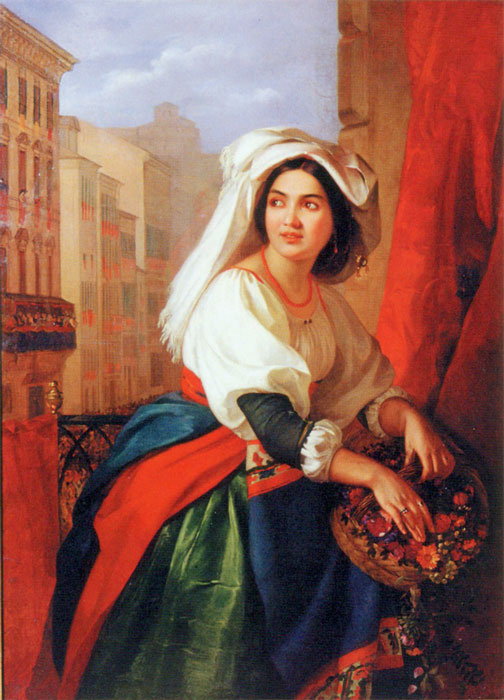
The Girl in the Carnival by Apollon Mokritsky

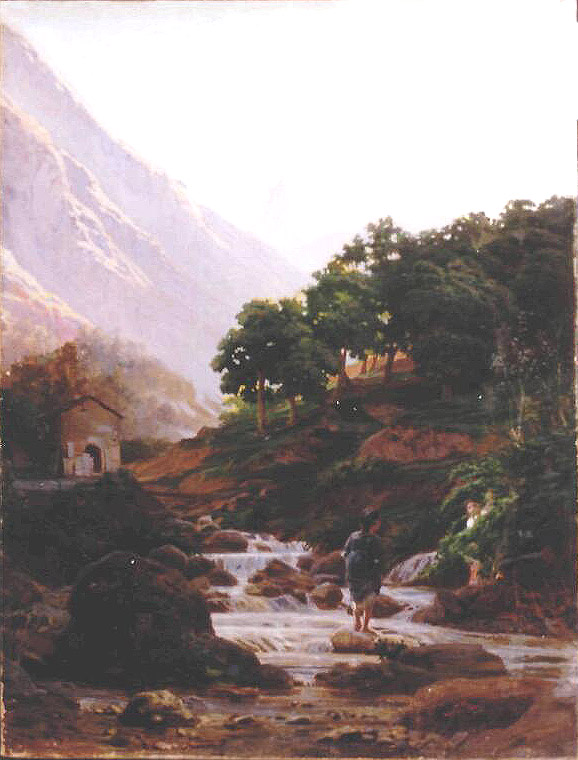
Carrara by Nikolai Ge

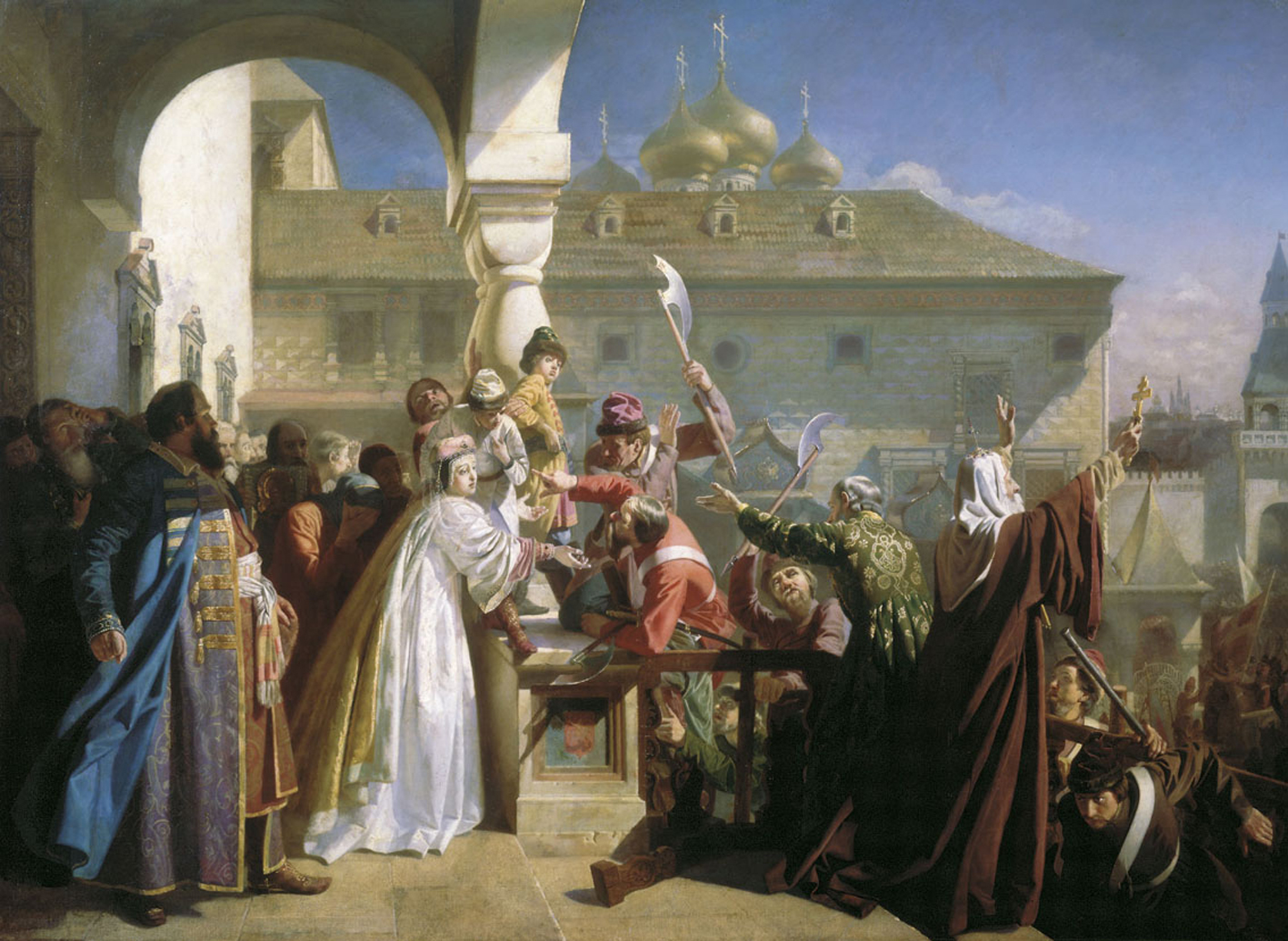
Moscow Uprising of 1682 by Nikolai Dmitriev-Orenburgsky

== Bibliography ==
- Schuhmacher, Jacques (2024). Nazi-Era Provenance of Museum Collections: A Research Guide (PDF). London: UCL Press. ISBN 9781800086890.
