= Apollon Mokritsky =

Russian painter

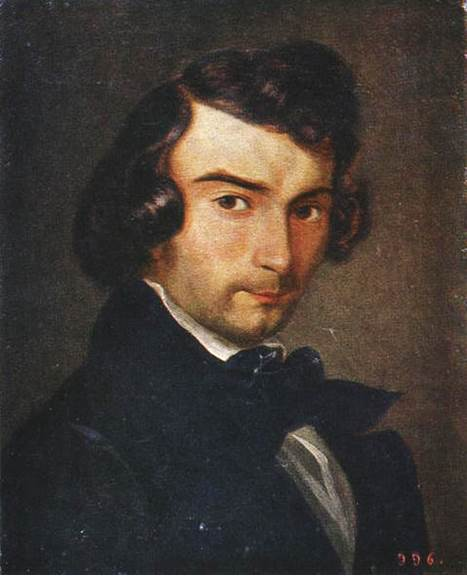
Self-portrait, c.1840

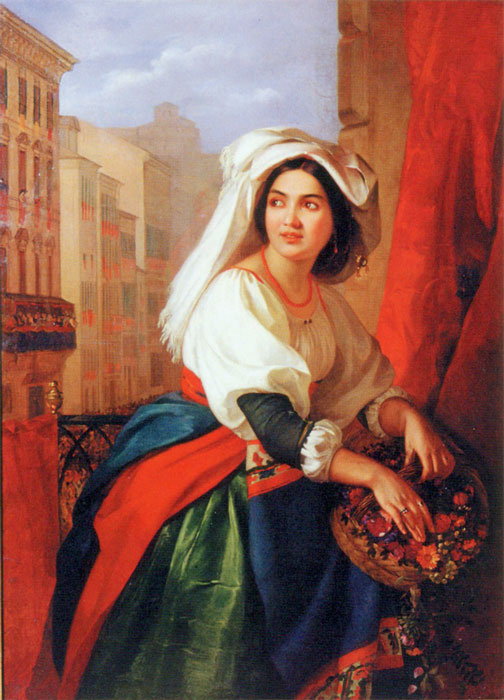
The Girl at the Carnival, located at the Taganrog Museum of Art

Apollon Nikolayevich Mokritsky (Ukrainian: Аполлон Миколайович Мокрицький, Apollon Mokrytskyi; Russian: Аполлон Николаевич Мокрицкий, Apollon Mokritsky, August 1810 – 1870) was a Russian painter of the Biedermeier period of Realist art. From 1849, he was a full member of the Saint Petersburg Academy of Arts.

== Biography ==
Mokritsky was born in August 1810, in Pyriatyn, Poltava Governorate, modern day Ukraine. His early art education was completed at the Nizhyn Lyceum of Prince Bezborodko, under the supervision of Kapiton Pavlov. After this, he studied at the St. Petersburg Academy of Art between 1830 and 1839, under Alexey Venetsianov and later with Karl Briullov. A year after completing his studies, he worked in Ukraine and visited Italy.

Around 1850, he was appointed "an academician of painting" at the Moscow School of Painting, Sculpture, and Architecture.

He preferred to work in portraiture, representing "the Biedermeier school of uncontrolled Realist art which exhibited romantic overtones". Artist's Wife is one example of this style. Others include portraits of Yevhen Hrebinka (1840) and Nikolai Gogol, a self-portrait (1840), and numerous Italian landscapes.

He is known for the significant role he played in the life of Taras Shevchenko, Ukraine's national poet and artist, who was born a serf. He introduced Shevchenko to the Russian and Ukrainian intelligentsia: artists Karl Briullov and Alexey Venetsianov, poet Vasily Zhukovsky, writer Yevhen Hrebinka, intellectuals Panteleimon Kulish, Vasyl Hryhorovych and others. These individuals became interested in Shevchenko's fate, and helped to secure his freedom from serfdom. Mokritsky left a diary (1975) which contains much material about Shevchenko.

He died in Moscow in 1870, aged 60.

== Characteristics of art ==
A skilful portrait painter, Mokritsky also painted landscapes. He enjoyed great popularity and had many commissions. His Italian portraits and landscapes sold well, eventually becoming exhibits in many Russian museums.

Mokritsky's portrait work is an example of the representations and trends typical of sentimental-romantic artists. At the same time, his works are interesting because they contain some features of realism. At the same time, Mokritsky - one of the many artists of the XIX century, a creative formation of which to a great extent fell under the influence of academic formal art school. The gallery of portraits of his contemporaries - Gogol, Hrebinka, Koltsov and Kukolnik - are the best in the artist's artistic legacy.
