= Tchaikovsky House in Taganrog =

Coordinates: 47.2125°N 38.9382°E

The Music Department of the Central Municipal Public Library named after Anton Chekhov and the Concert Hall
- Нотно-музыкальный отдел Центральной городской публичной библиотеки имени А.П.Чехова
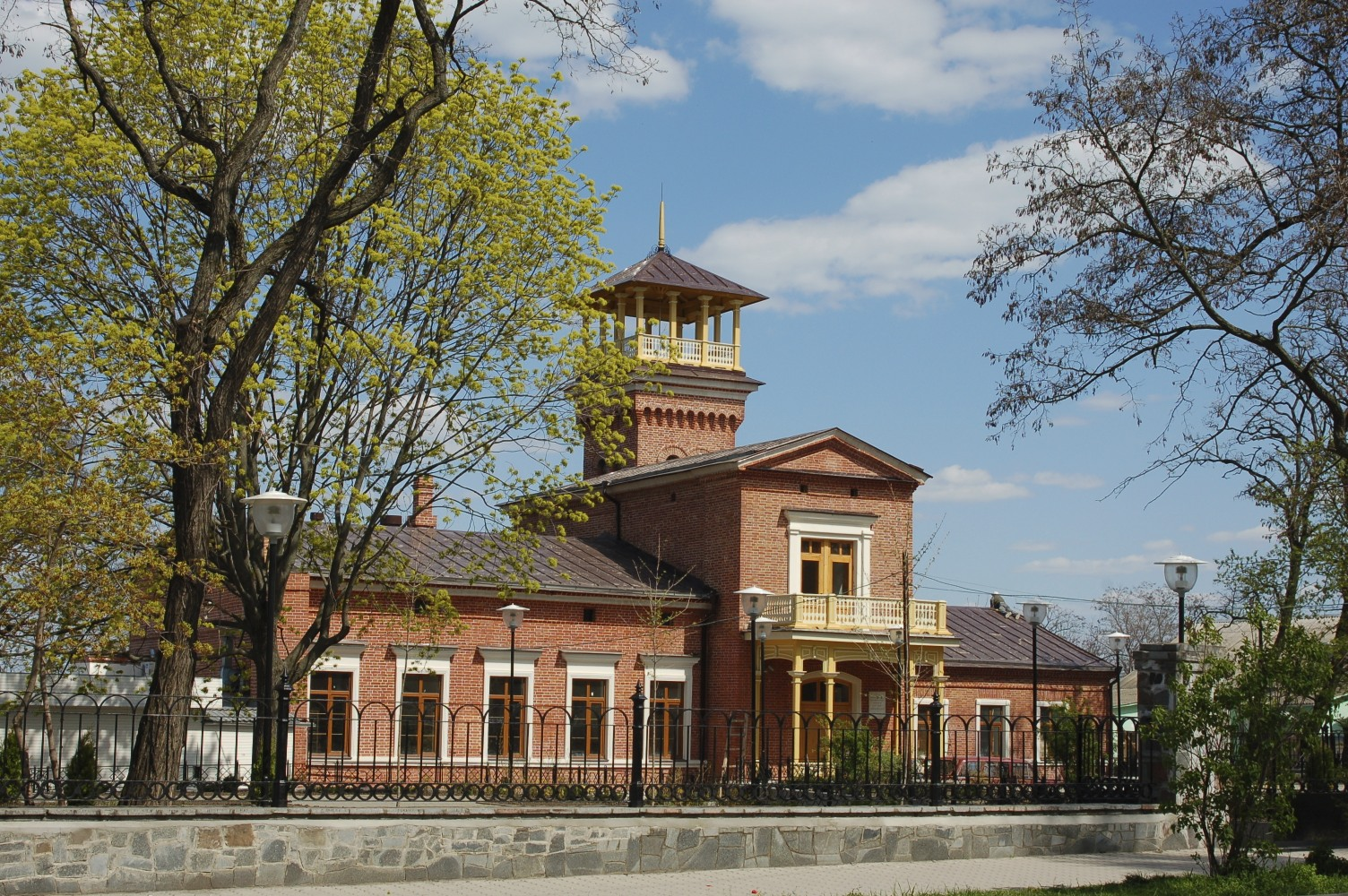
- The Tchaikovsky House after renovation in 2010
- Location: Taganrog, Rostov Oblast, Russia
- Type: Public library
- Established: January 2, 1967, in this building since 1975, the mansion built in the early 1870s
- Branch of: Chekhov Library

Collection
- Items collected: 40 thousand

Access and use
- Population served: Taganrog

Other information
- Director: Mrs. Zinaida Boyko (Russian: Бойко Зинаида Анатольевна)
- Website: www.library.taganrog.ru/musical.html

The Tchaikovsky House in Taganrog is a historical mansion in downtown Taganrog, Russia, at 56 Grecheskaya Street. The mansion was built in early 1870s and was designed by the architect Mikhail Petrov. It was owned by the merchant Sarandino until the mid-1890s.

From 1883 until 1894, the building was rented by the captain of the first rank Ippolit Tchaikovsky who served in Taganrog representing the Russian Society of navigation and trade. Pyotr Tchaikovsky came to Taganrog and stayed at this house three times: in 1886, 1888 and in 1890.

The building was mentioned in one of Anton Chekhov's letters to his cousin Georgy Chekhov in 1895:

If I were rich, I would certainly buy the house where Ippolit Tchaikovsky used to live.

The mansion was damaged during the 1927 Crimean earthquakes and as consequence, the left wing was demolished.

In 1975 the music department of the Chekhov Library and the concert hall moved into the building. A memorial room, where Pyotr Tchaikovsky stayed was transformed into a small museum dedicated to Tchaikovsky family and their relations with Anton Chekhov. The museum was inaugurated on May 1, 1976.

== Gallery ==
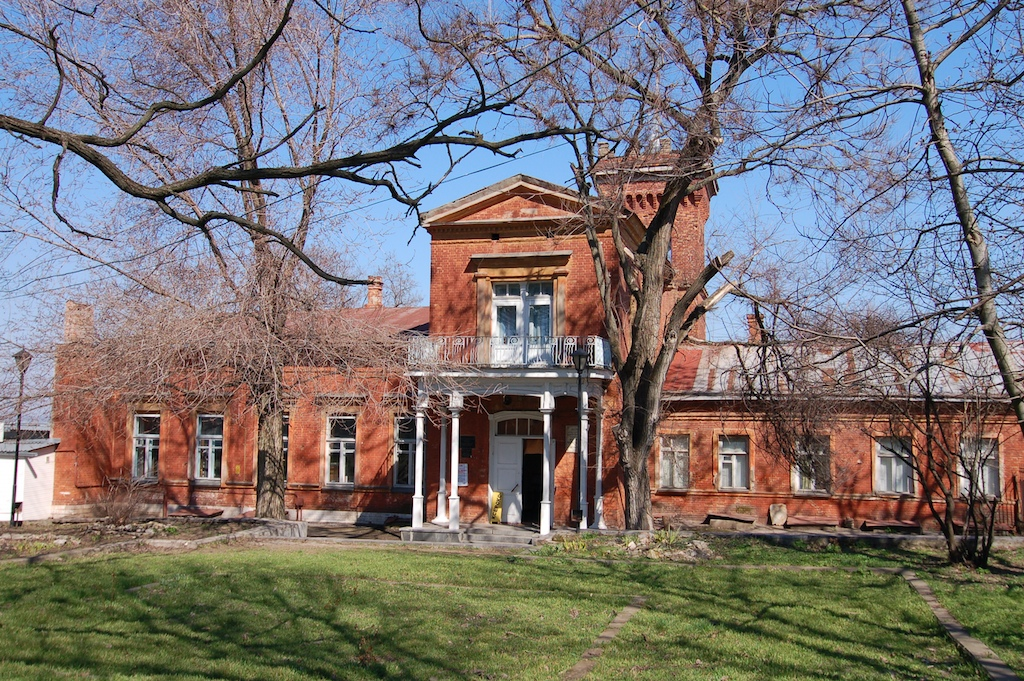

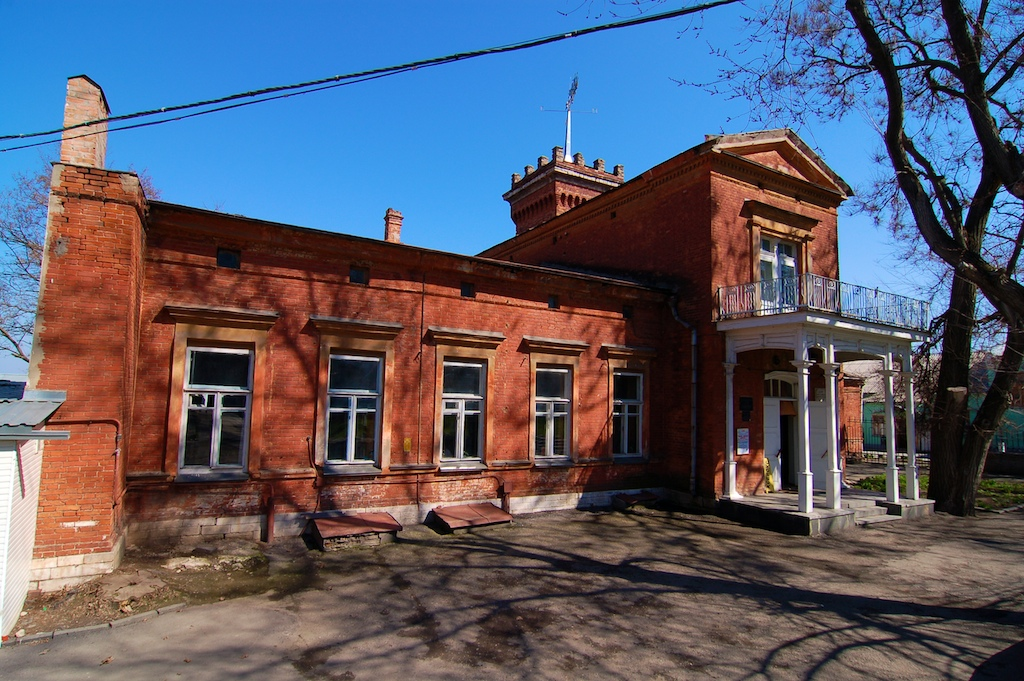

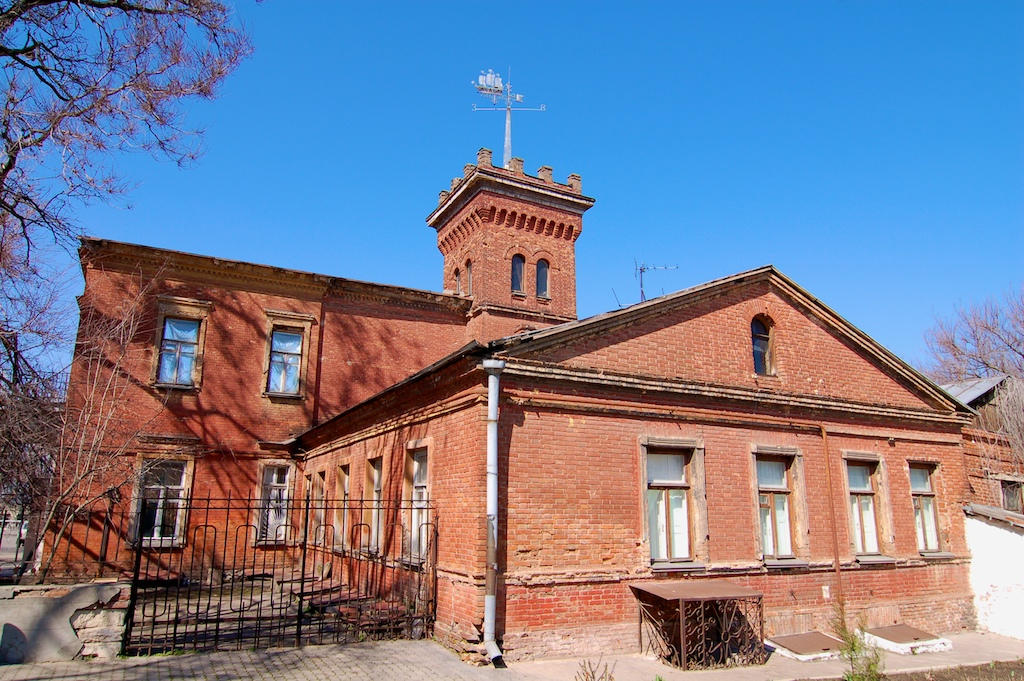

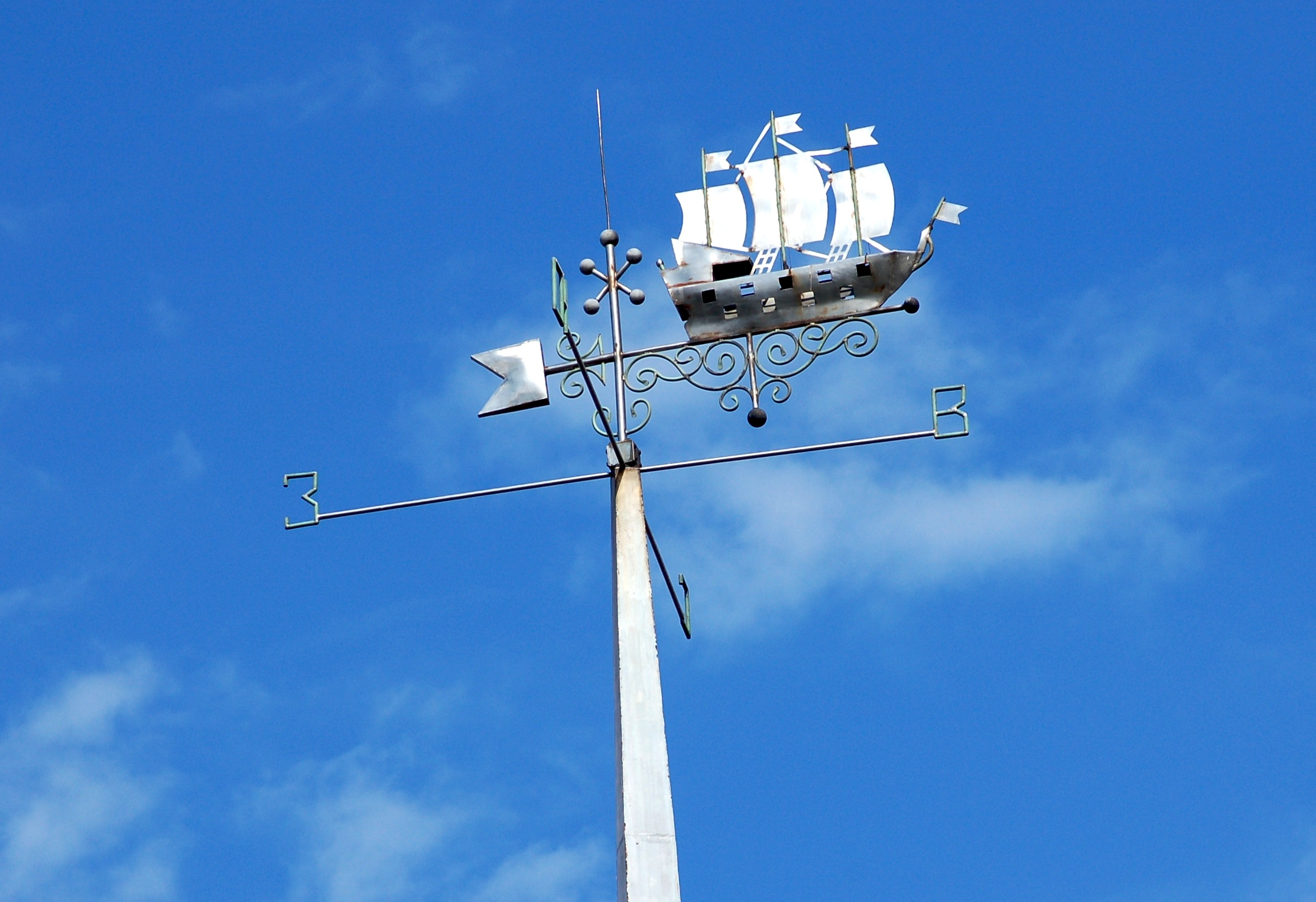
Tchaikovsky House Weather vane (1976-2009)

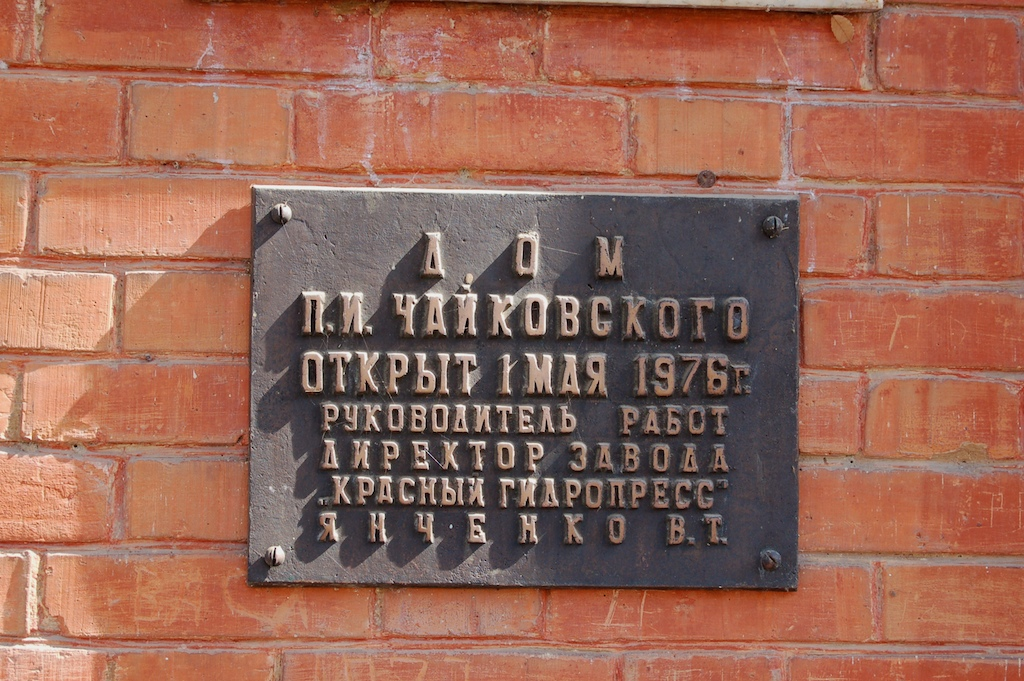
Memorial plaque on the opening of the museum in 1976

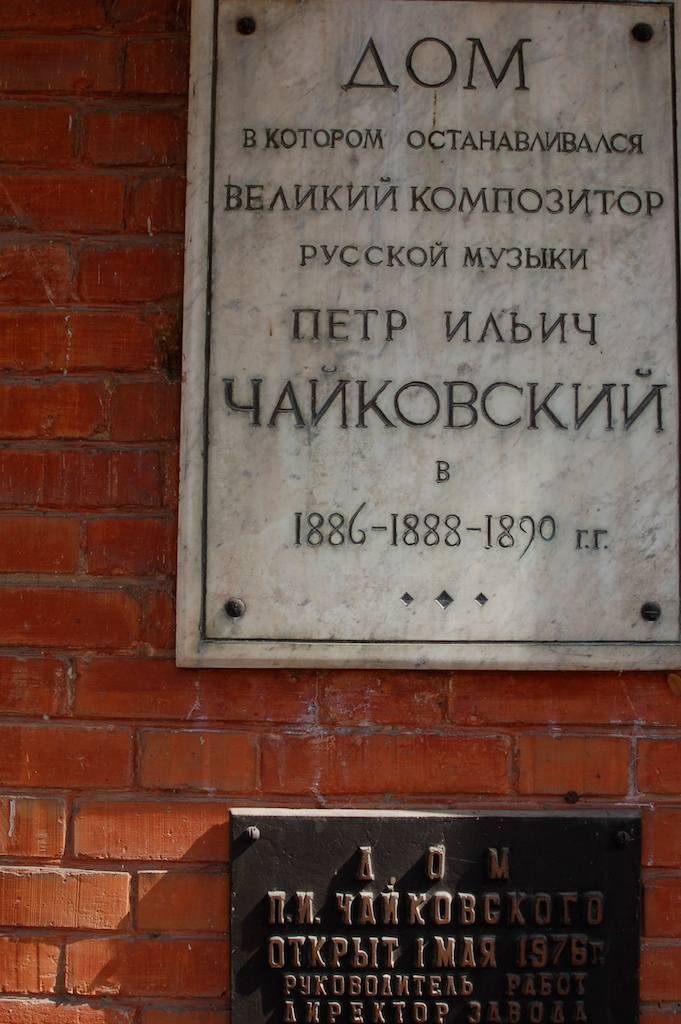
Memorial plaque on Tchaikovsky House

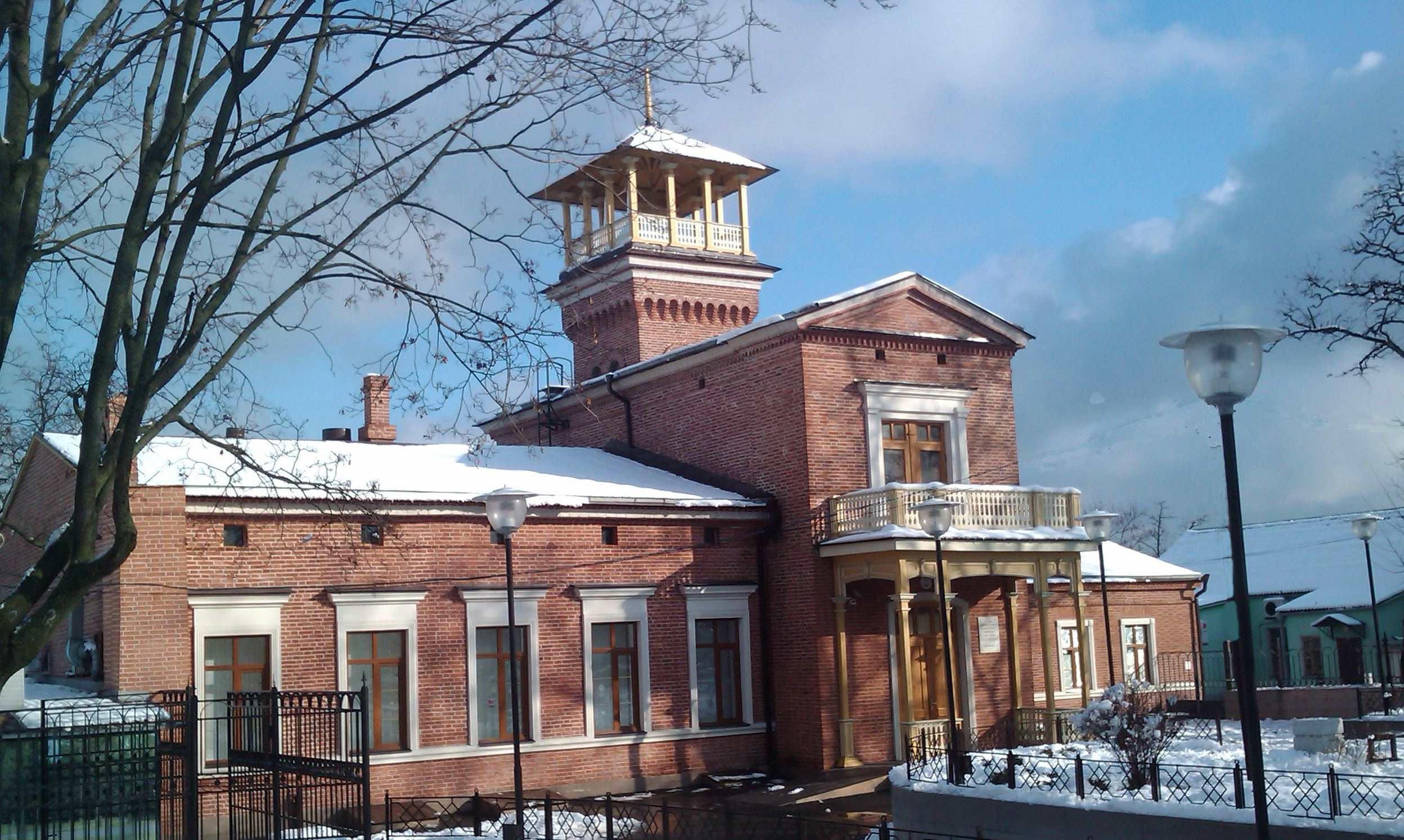

== External links and references ==
- А.А.Овчинникова "Дом Чайковских" в "Вехи Таганрога. Историко-литературный альманах" №41-42, стр. 51-53
