= Isayev (surname) =

Isayev, Isaev (Russian: Иса́ев; masculine) or Isayeva, Isaeva (Иса́ева; feminine) is a Russian language family name which means "(son) of Isai", with Isai (Иса́й) being the Russian given name that corresponds to "Isaiah". Notable people with the surname include:

- Aiday Isaeva (born 1989), Kazakh beauty pageant titleholder
- Aleksei Isaev (engineer) (1908–1971), Russian rocket engineer
- Aleksey Isayev (born 1995), Russian association football player
- Ali Isayev (born 1983), Azerbaijani wrestler
- Anatoli Isayev (1932–2016), Soviet/Russian soccer player and coach
- Antonina Isaeva (born 1947), Ukrainian milkmaid and politician
- Andrey Isayev (born 1971), Russian politician
- Arif İsayev (born 1985), Azerbaijani association football player
- Daria Isaeva (born 1990), Russian volleyball player
- Daniil Isayev (born 2000), Russian ice hockey goaltender
- Dimitri Isayev (1905–1930), Chuvash writer and critic
- Dimitri Isayev (born 1973), Russian actor
- Grigory Isayev (born 1943), Russian politician
- Hasan Isaev (born 1952), Bulgarian freestyle wrestler
- Ivan Isayev (born 1927), Russian Olympic shooter
- Ivan Ivanovich Isaev, Russian general
- Magomet Isayev (1928–2011), Russian Esperantist
- Maksim Isayev, fictional Russian spy in Nazi Germany working under his undercover name of Max Otto von Stierlitz
- Mansur Isaev (born 1986), Russian Olympic judoka
- Nadira Isayeva, Russian journalist
- Pyotr Isayev, better known as Petka, the aide-de-camp of Vasily Chapayev
- Shamil Isayev (1964–2019), Russian association football player
- Jacob Isayev (born 2013)
