= Yevhen Hrebinka =

Ukrainian poet

Yevhen Pavlovych Hrebinka
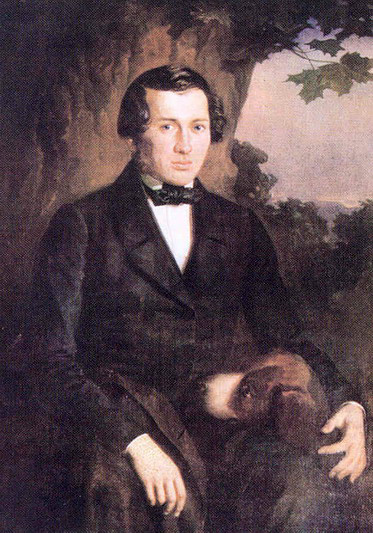
- Portrait of Yevhen Hrebinka by Apollon Mokritsky in 1841
- Born: Євген Павлович Гребінка; 2 February 1812; Ubizhyshche, Piryatinsky Uyezd Poltava Governorate, Russian Empire
- Died: 15 December 1848 (aged 36); Saint Petersburg, Russian Empire
- Occupation: Poet
- Spouse: Maria Rostenberg (from 1844)
- Writing career
- Literary movement: Romanticism

Yevhen Pavlovych Hrebinka (Ukrainian: Євген Павлович Гребінка; Russian: Евге́ний Па́влович Гребёнка; 2 February 1812 – 15 December 1848) was a Ukrainian romantic prose writer, poet, and philanthropist. He wrote in both the Ukrainian and Russian languages. He was an older brother of the architect Mykola Hrebinka.

== Life and career ==
Yevhen was born in a khutir, Ubizhyshche, to a retired stabs-rotmistr, (1LT) Pavlo Ivanovych Hrebinka, and the daughter of a Cossack captain from Pyriatyn, Nadiia Chaikovska. He received his elementary education at home. From 1825 to 1831 he studied at the Gymnasium of Higher Sciences in Nizhyn. Hrebinka began writing his poems while in school. In 1827 he wrote his drama piece V chuzhie sani ne sadis (Do not get seated in others sleigh - Russian proverb). In 1829 he started to work on a Ukrainian language translation of a poem by Pushkin, Poltava.

Hrebinka's first published work was the poem Rogdayev pir, appearing in the Ukrainian almanac in Kharkiv in 1831. The same year he was drafted into the army as an ober-officer in the 8th Reserve Malorossiysky Regiment quartered in Pyriatyn. Created to fight against the 1831 November Uprising, the regiment failed to leave the city of Pyriatyn. After the defeat of the uprising, Hrebinka retired from the military.

In 1834 he moved to Saint Petersburg and published "Little Russian Fables" (Malorossiiskie prikazki) in Moscow which, because of its vivid and pure language, wit, laconic style, and attention to ethnographic detail, ranks among the best collections of fables in Ukrainian literature. Many of his lyrical poems, such as A Ukrainian Melody (1839) became folk songs. Hrebinka is recognized as a leading representative of the so-called "Ukrainian school" of Russian literature. In June 1835 through Ivan Soshenko, he met with Taras Shevchenko. In 1836 Hrebinka published his translated version of Poltava in the Ukrainian language.

While traveling I was thinking: What will I do among moskals? But came out contrary: Petersburg is a colony of educated Little Russians.

— Yevhen Hrebinka,

Many of his Russian language works include Ukrainian themes, such as Stories of a Pyriatynian (1837), the historical poems Hetman Svirgovskii (1839) and Bogdan (1843), the novelette The Nizhen Colonel Zolotarenko (1842), and the novel Chaikovskii (1843). In 1843 he wrote a poem "Dark Eyes" that would later become a famous Russian song with the same name.

Beginning in 1837, Hrebinka worked as a teacher of the Russian language in the Noble Regiment, collected works in the Ukrainian language, and was involved in publishing Otechestvennye Zapiski in the magazine's final years. After being refused, he compiled and published another Ukrainian almanac, Lastôvka, in 1841. It had 382 pages and contained works by many famous Ukrainian authors, along with Ukrainian folk songs, popular proverbs, and folktales.

Hrebinka took kindly to a young artist and serf, Taras Shevchenko, and helped connect him with members of the Saint Petersburg elite, who organized Shevchenko's liberation from serfdom in 1838. He also helped publish Shevchenko's Kobzar in 1840. In 1840 Otechestvennye Zapiski published his novella Notes of a student, while Utrenneya zarya published novella Wader. In 1842 he wrote novella Senya. In 1843 Hrebinka travelled to Kharkiv and together with Taras Shevchenko he visited Tetyana Volkhovskaya in her manor in Moisivka (near Drabiv). The same year Otechestvennye Zapiski published his novel Chaikovsky with epigraphs taken out of the Shevchenko's works. In 1844 Hrebinka married Maria Rostenberg and the same year his other novel Doktor was published.

Not long before the establishment of Brotherhood of Saints Cyril and Methodius, Hrebinka met with Panteleimon Kulish in 1845 and wrote a story Petersburg side. In 1846 he started to publish his collection of prose work and before own death late in 1848 managed to release eight volumes. In 1847, Hrebinka established, out of his own pocket, a parish school for peasant children in Rudky village, not far from where he was born. The same year his novellas Zaborov and Adventures of the Blue Assignation were published.

On 3 December 1848 Hrebinka died from tuberculosis in Saint Petersburg. He was buried back at home in Ubizhyshche.

His collected works were first published in 1862.
