= Taganrog resistance movement =

Anti-fascist resistance organization in German-occupied USSR

Taganrog underground resistance movement
- Leaders: Vasily Afonov, Semion Morozov
- Dates active: 1941–1943
- Active regions: Axis-occupied Taganrog, its suburbs and neighboring villages
- Ideology: Communism
- Size: 500
- Part of: Soviet partisans
- Wars: the Great Patriotic War

Taganrog underground resistance movement was an Antifascist underground group of young Komsomol members acting in occupied Taganrog in 1941–1943.

== History ==
In November 1941, Semion Morozov and Vasily Afonov organized an underground resistance group, which consisted mainly of young Komsomol members.

As of early December 1941 only 11 young people were members of the Taganrog resistance movement, while in early 1943 more than 500 people who were divided into 27 partisan groups acted against occupation forces in Taganrog.

On February 18, 1943 were arrested Semion Morozov and the core of the underground movement's activists. In spring 1943 Gestapo agents infiltrated the underground movement. After several mass arrests in February–May 1943 over 200 members of the Taganrog underground resistance movement were detained, tortured and killed (including 27 women and 2 children). The last execution by firing squad was carried out on July 12, 1943.

In 1965-1966, 126 members of the Taganrog underground resistance movement were awarded with orders and medals, the Commissar of the Taganrog's underground Semion Morozov was posthumously made Hero of the Soviet Union, the leader of the partisan group Vasily Afonov was posthumously awarded with an Order of Lenin.

== Major resistance operations ==
- November 15, 1941: arson and explosion at the Taganrog seaport's ammunition depot (completely destroyed)
- Early December 1941: explosion at the Taganrog City Hall, its canteen and the car repair shop (147 Nazi Germany officers and soldiers killed.
- December 1941: arson at the "Krasny Gidropress" factory (40 trucks burnt).
- January 25, 1942: arson of wood materials (used for repair of German aircraft) at the territory of the Beriev Aircraft Company
- April–May 1942: two diversion acts at the "Krasny Gidropress" factory (13 and 120 trucks temporarily out of service)
- June 1942: derailment of the train (10 wagons) at Martsevo/Koshkino
- October 1942: derailment of the train transporting panzers, cars and ammunition between Varenovka and Primorka stations
- January 1943: hole-traps made (from Ochakovsk tail up to Taganrog) on the ice of the Gulf of Taganrog, which resulted in a gross loss of horses (more than 100)
- December 1942: attack on the police station near Mayakovka village. 4 light machine-guns, 10 rifles, grenades were captured.
- February 1943: 4 attacks on German and Romanian troops who were retreating through the Gulf of Taganrog. Captured 7 machine-guns, 40 rifles, 13 submachine guns, 11 heavily loaded trucks were sunken in Azov Sea, 37 Nazi Germany soldiers killed.
- March 1943: arson of a truck loaded with products and cereals (truck completely destroyed).
- May 14, 1943: successful assassination attempt by Sergey Weiss and Yuri Pazon of Sicherheitsdienst's informants Musikova and Raevskaya.
- (throughout the duration of the occupation period) Distribution of leaflets and Sovinformburo's information bulletins.

== Remembrance ==
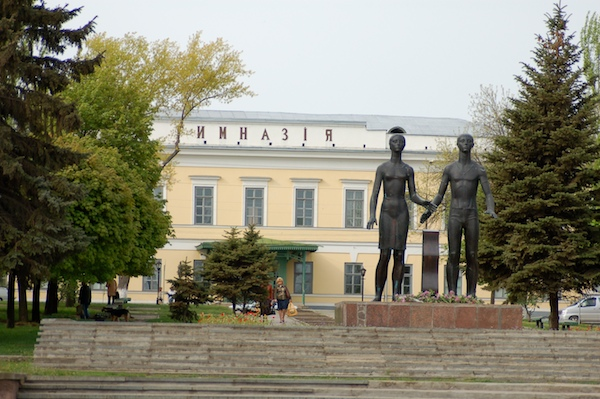
Monument to the resistance in Chekhov Gymnasium.

The monument "Oath of the Youth" (Russian: "Клятва юности") to heroes of the Taganrog resistance movement was inaugurated on August 30, 1973 on Spartakovski pereulok, in front of the Chekhov Gymnasium.

== Trivia ==
Apart from the group of young people led by Afonov and Morozov, in Taganrog acted at least 2 Soviet partisans groups organized by NKVD before the Soviet troops left the city. The members of the groups acted separately and were not permitted to get into contact.

== See also ==
- History of Taganrog
- Taganrog during World War II
- Young Guard (Soviet resistance)
