= Mariinsky Girls' Gymnasium (Taganrog) =

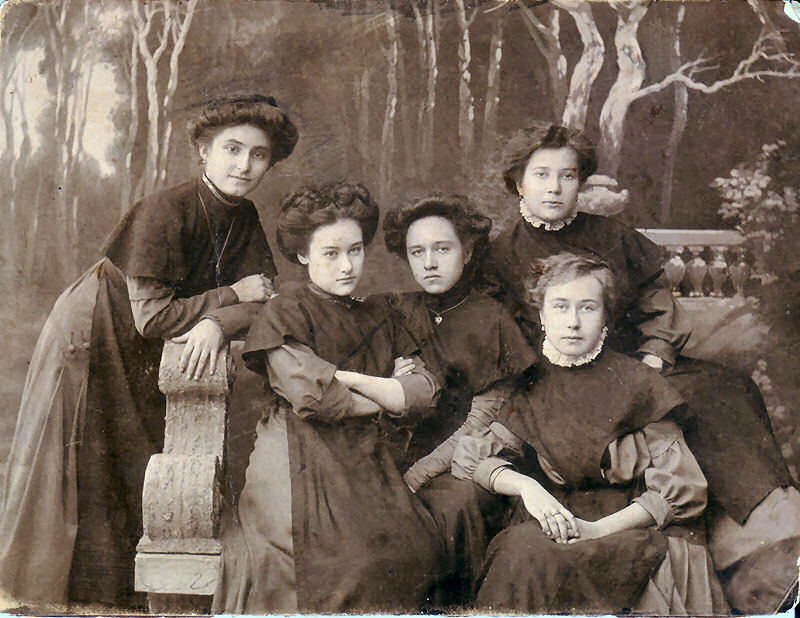
8th year students of the Taganrog Mariinskaya Girls Gymnasium (photo taken in 1910).

The Mariinskaya Gymnasium (Russian: Мариинская гимназия) in Taganrog on Chekhov Str. 104 - currently school No. 15 of the North Caucasus Railway – originated from two oldest educational establishments in the South of Russia: the Mariinskaya Gymnasium for Girls and the Railway Vocational School.

== History of Gymnasium ==
The present building of the gymnasium was constructed in 1875. In 1861 a school for girls had been opened in Taganrog and later renamed Mariinskaya Gymnasium for Girls. Among the students were such eminent people as the People's Artist of the USSR Faina Ranevskaya, artist Seraphima Blonskaya, poets Sophia Parnok and Yelizaveta Tarakhovskaya, an active member of Narodnaya Volya organization Nadezhda Sigida (Malaksiano), Anton Chekhov’s sister Maria.

The Railway Vocational School with the 4-year course of studies was opened in Taganrog on September 1, 1896, on the initiative of a group of railway employees. After the Soviet power had been established in Taganrog, the Railway Vocational School was transformed into the 7-year labor school No 6, which moved into the building of the Mariinskaya Gymnaium in 1920.

In 1993 the School No 15 regained the status of gymnasium.

== Famous graduates ==
Girls' Gymnasium

- Faina Ranevskaya, actress
- Sophia Parnok, poet,
- Nadezhda Sigida, revolutionary
- Yelizaveta Tarakhovskaya, poet and writer
- Seraphima Blonskaya, artist
- Maria Chekhova, teacher, artist

School no.15

- Semyon Morozov, Hero of the Soviet Union

== Old and Modern Views of Gymnasium ==
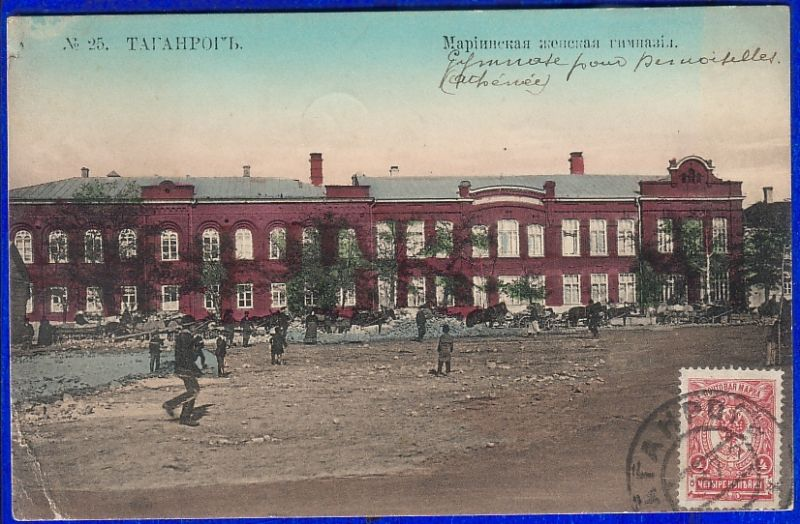
The Girls Gymnasium on an old postcard, with construction works still continuing.

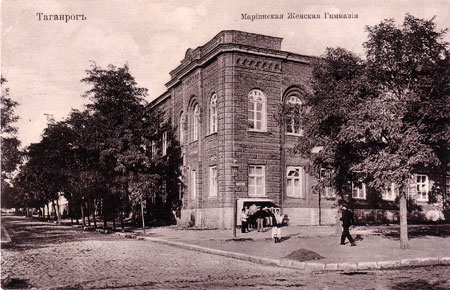
The Girls Gymnasium on an old postcard, late 19th century.

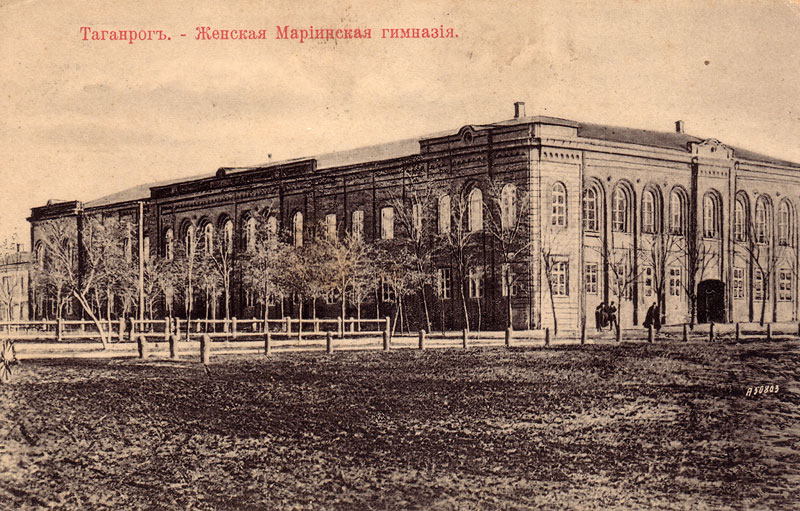
The Girls Gymnasium on an old postcard, late 19th century.

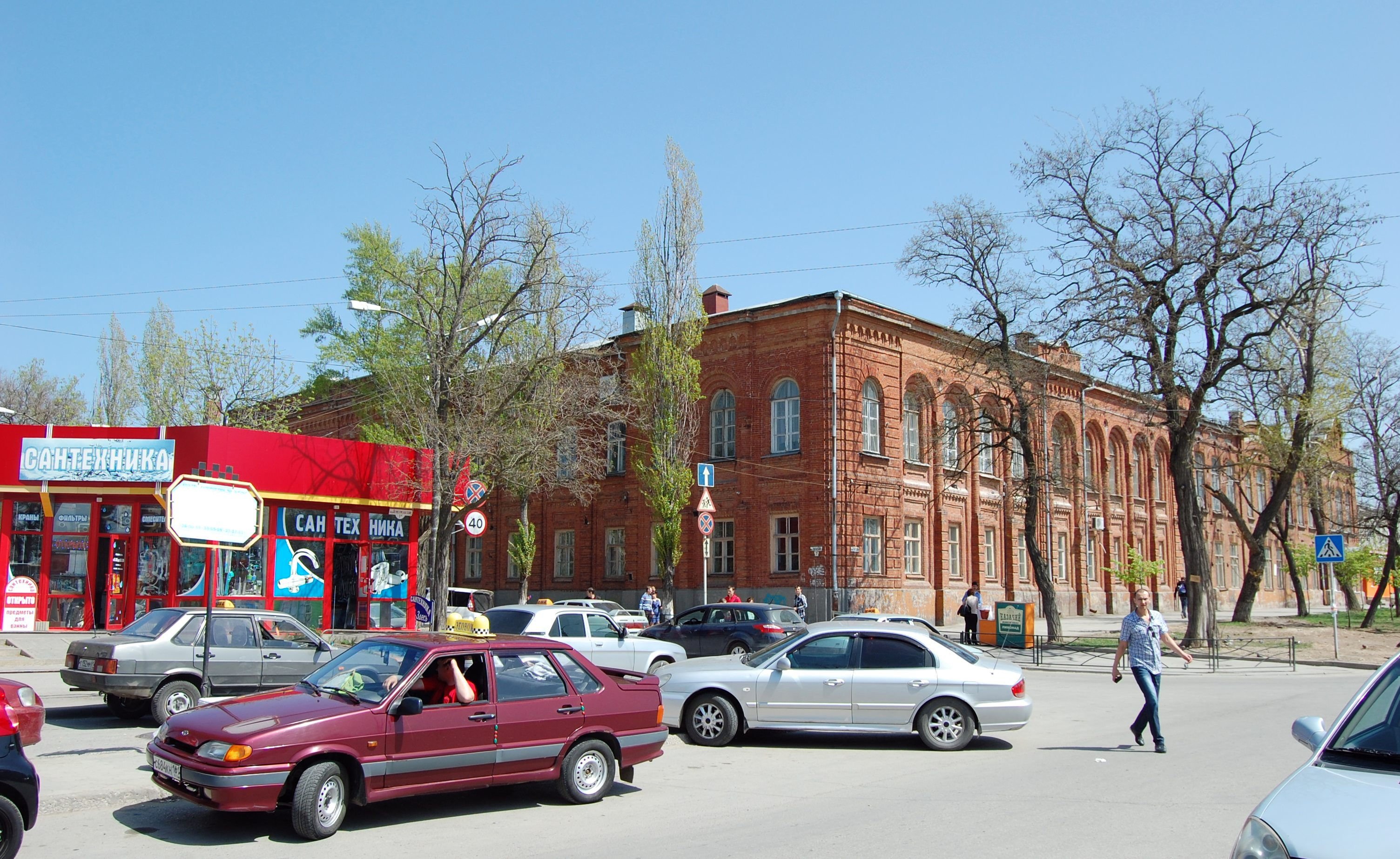
Mariinskaya Gymnasium in 2013
