= Taganrog Old Cemetery =

Cemetery in Taganrog, Russia

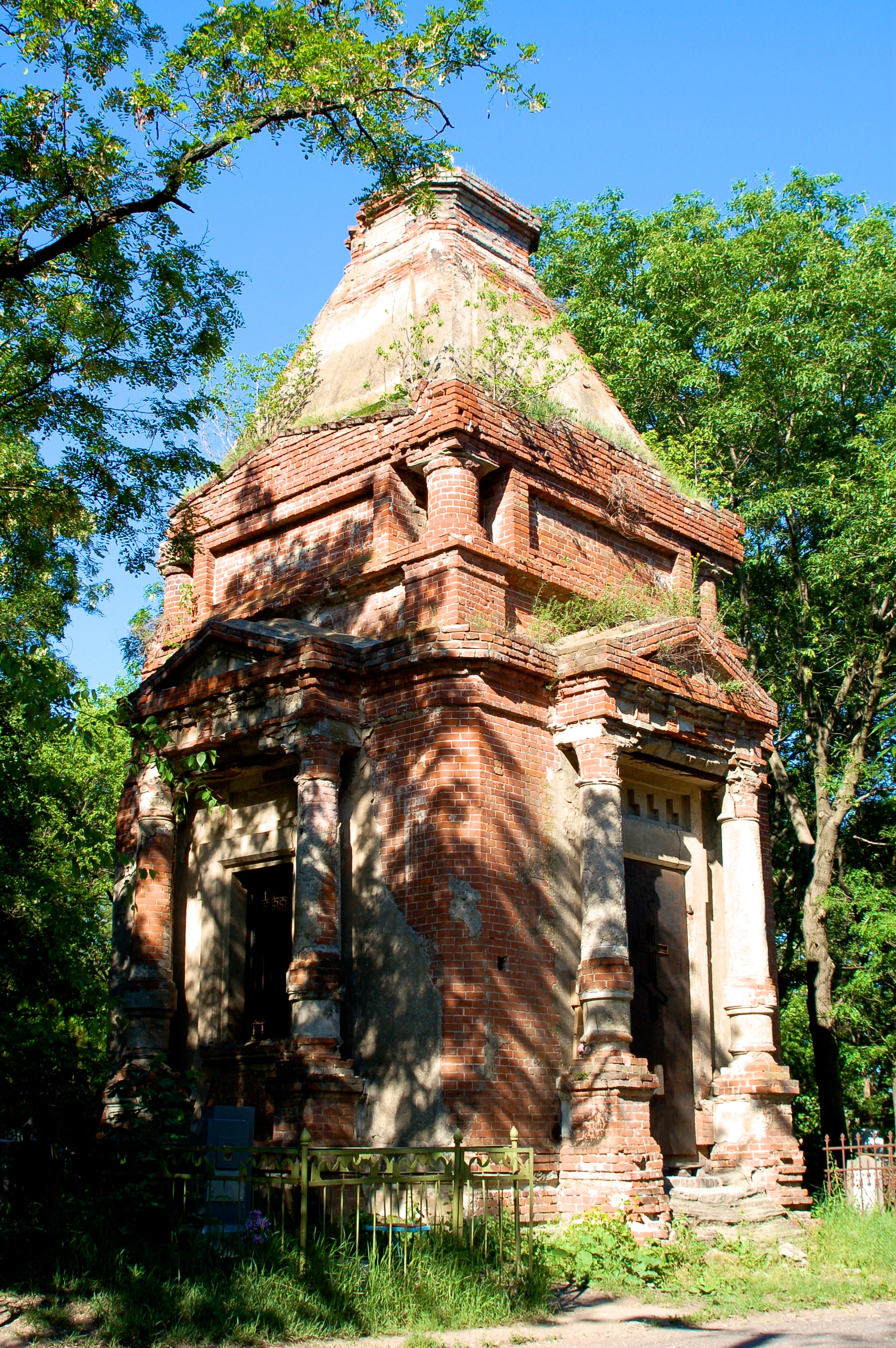
- Chapel burial vault of Litsin family at the Taganrog Old Cemetery
- Interactive map of Taganrog Old Cemetery

Details
- Established: 1809
- Location: Taganrog
- Country: Russia
- Coordinates: 47.207°N 38.902°E
- Size: 20 ha (49 acres)
- No. of interments: around 150,000
- Website: http://cemetery.su/

The Taganrog Old Cemetery (Russian: Старое городское кладбище в Таганроге) is a historic cemetery on the outskirts of Taganrog's historical downtown district that was closed for new burials in 1971.

== History ==
The cemetery was officially established in 1809 as a Christian cemetery, although the site has already had some burials. In 1810 the All Saints' Church in Taganrog on the cemetery's land was founded, which was consecrated and completed in 1824.

After Taganrog had been captured by the Red Army in late 1919, the cemetery was used for all interments. After the Second World War, several monuments and a traditional Soviet eternal flame were established on the cemetery territory.

On May 25, 1971 the cemetery was closed for new interments. In 1980's some of the older monuments were saved from destruction and desecration by being transferred into the inner yard of the Taganrog Museum of Art.

== Current state ==
Despite the inclusion of the historic cemetery into the register of architectural monuments, it has been severely damaged, looted and littered.

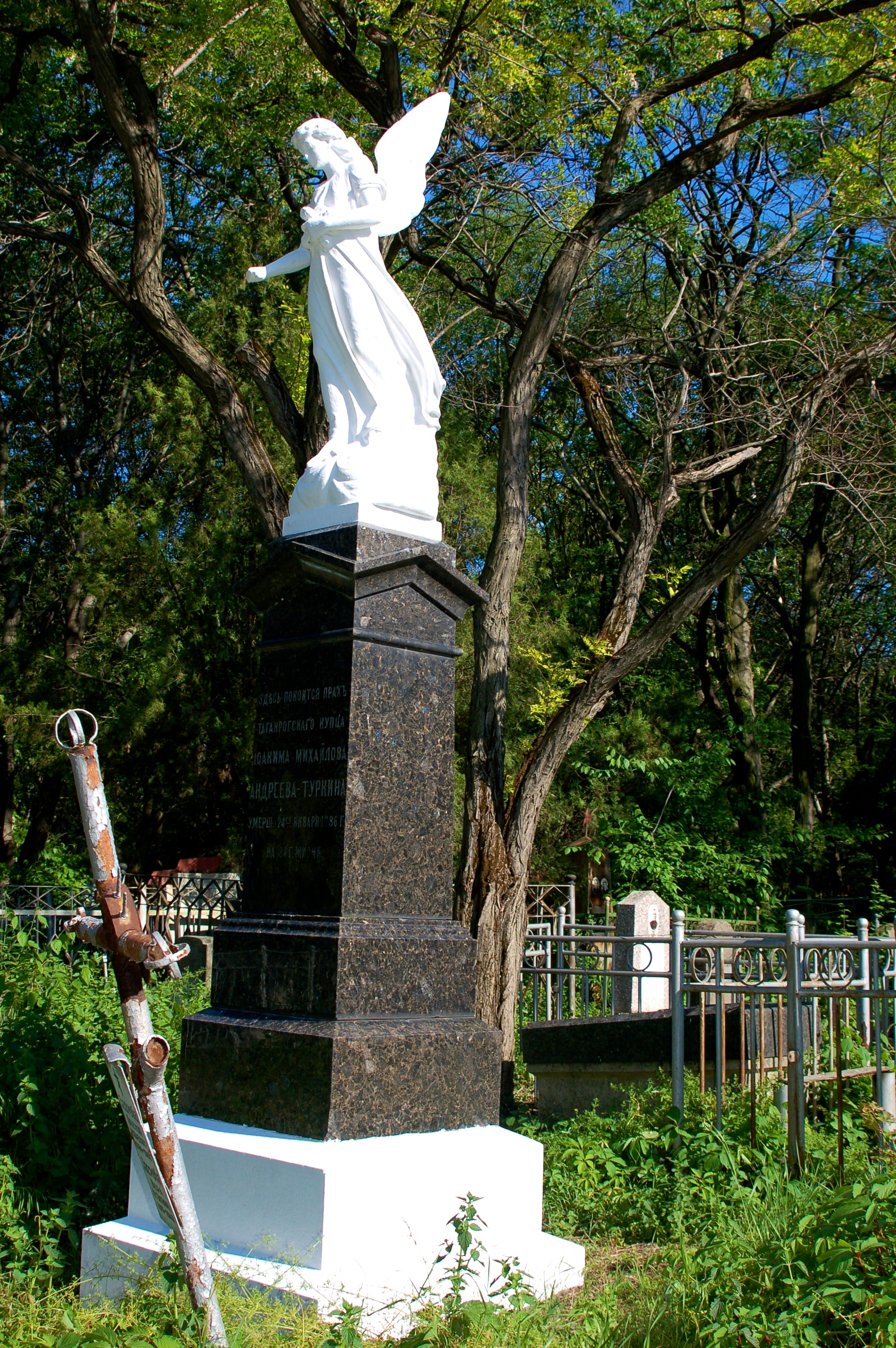
burial place of the Turkin family

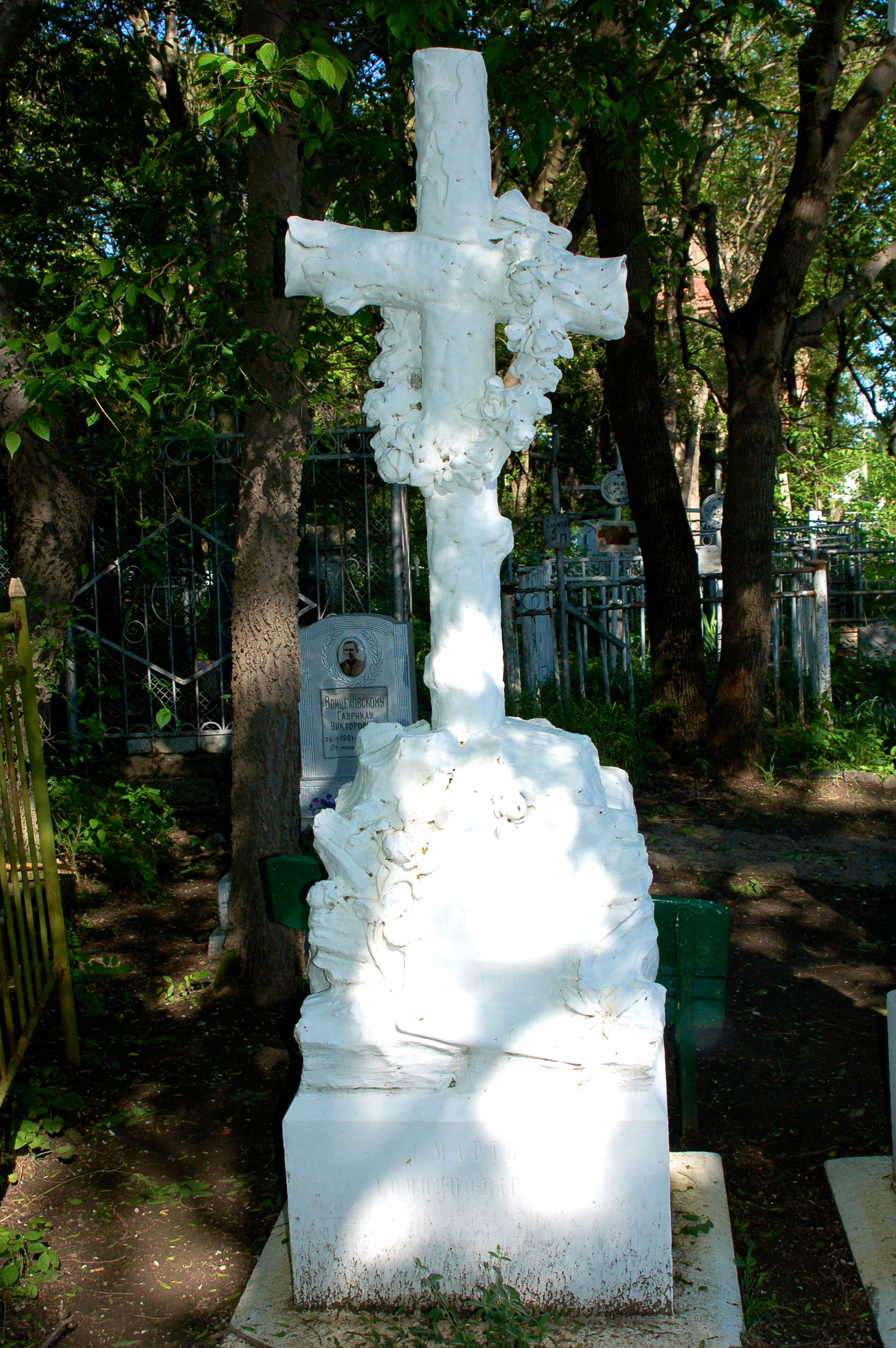
Grave of Maria Komnino-Varvatsi, a descendant of Ioannis Varvakis

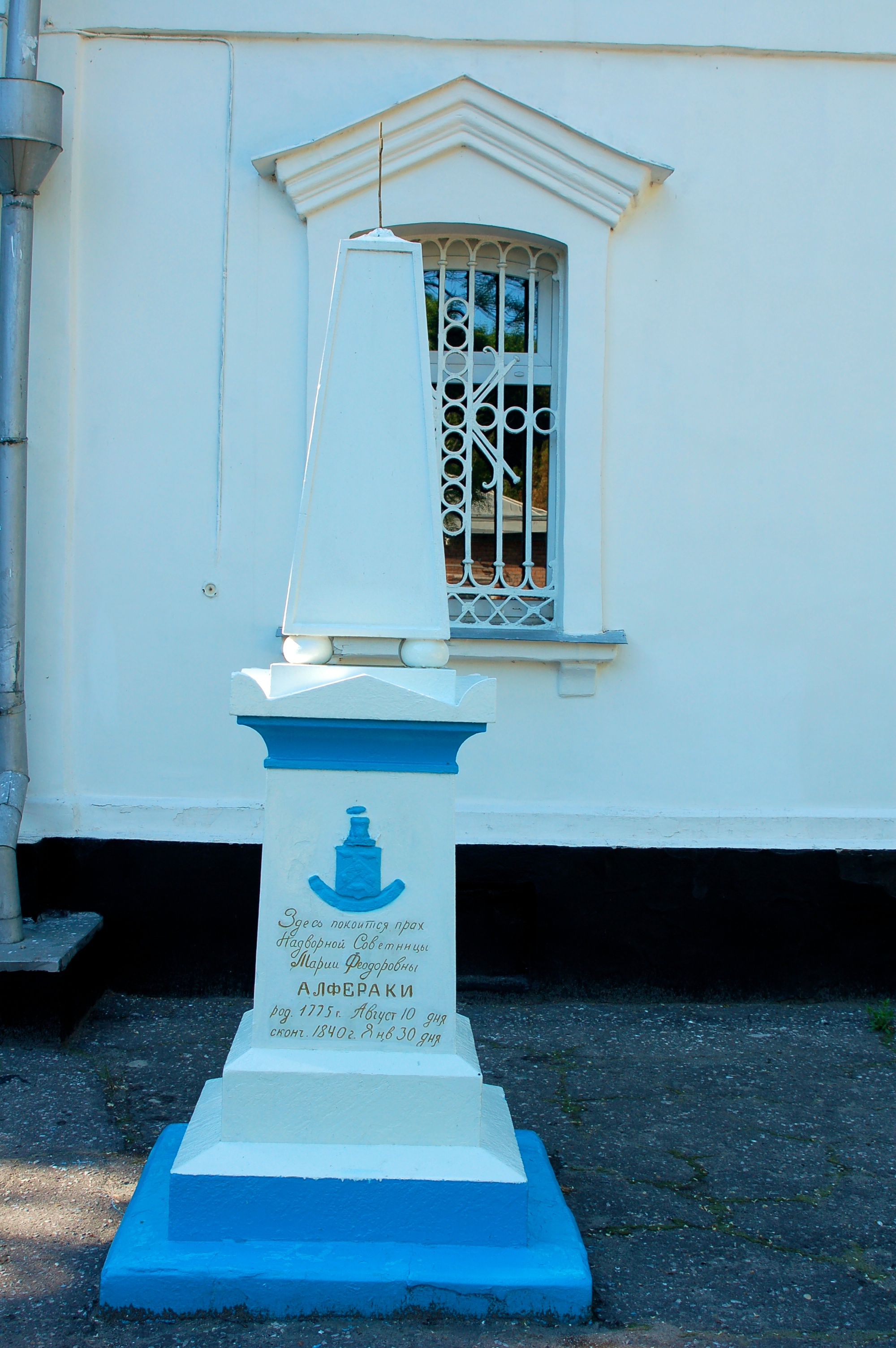
Grave of Maria Alferaki, mother of Sergei Alferaki and Achilles Alferaki

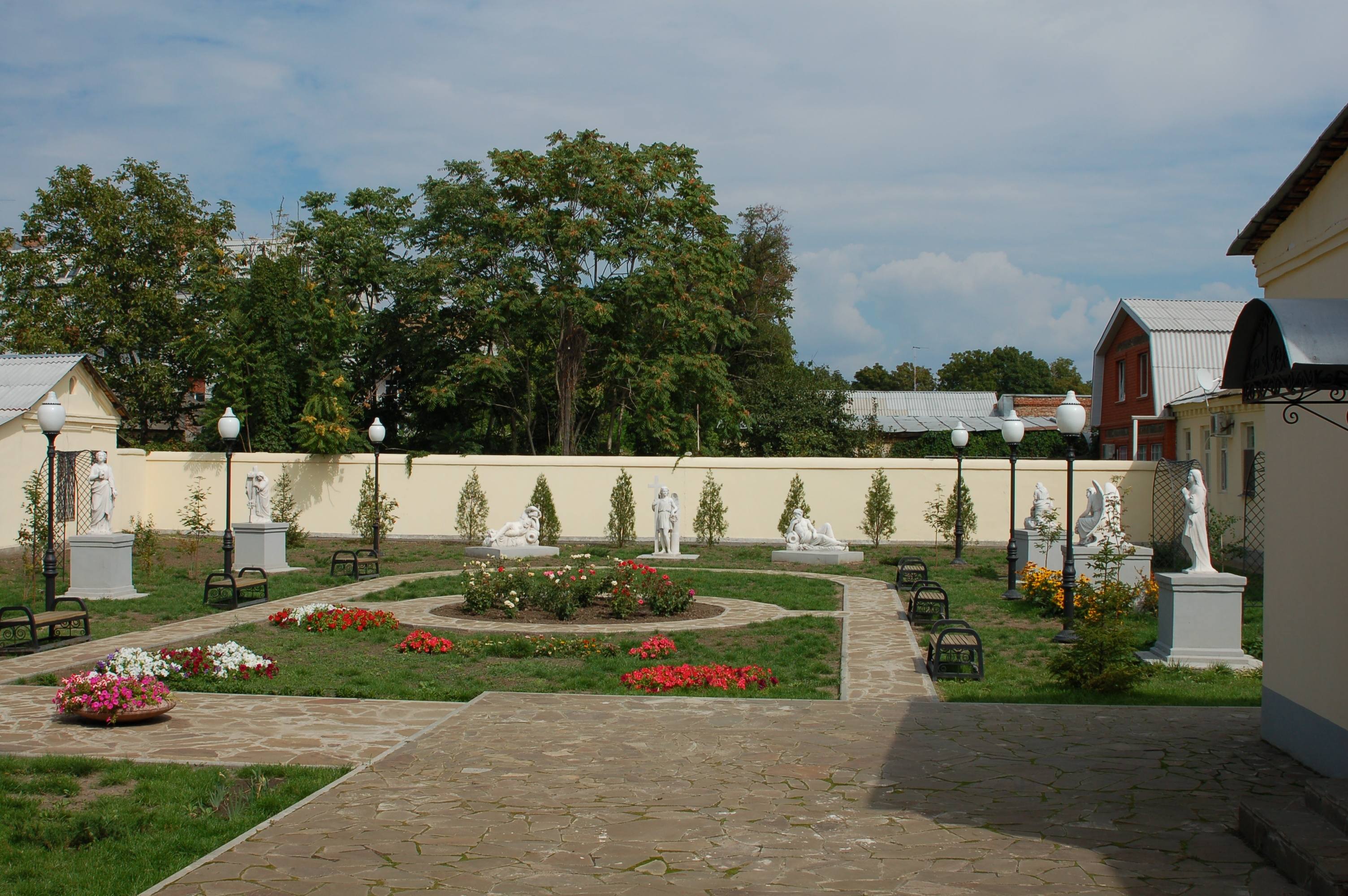
Monuments displaced into Taganrog Museum of Art's inner yard

== Prominent people buried in Taganrog Old Cemetery ==
- Paul von Rennenkampff – Baltic German general
- Saint Pavel of Taganrog (later relics transferred into St. Nicholas Church, Taganrog)
- Seraphima Blonskaya – Russian artist
- Lev Kulchitsky – Russian admiral, 13th Governor of Taganrog
- Konstantin Igelström – Decembrist
- Ivan Vasilenko – Soviet writer
- Alexander Lakier – founder of Russian heraldry
- Anatoly Durov – animal trainer

== External links and references ==
- В.С.Кукушин, А.И.Николаенко "Таганрогский некрополь XIX–XXвв. Историко–художественный очерк", Таганрог, "Лукоморье" 2006
- Таганрог. Энциклопедия, Таганрог, издательство АНТОН, 2008
