= Krasny Gidropress =

Russian manufacturing company

Coordinates: 47°13′58″N 38°53′52″E

JSC Krasny Gidropress
- Company type: Open Joint Stock Company
- Founded: 1907
- Headquarters: Taganrog, Russia
- Parent: Tactical Missiles Corporation
- Website: www.hpress.ttn.ru

JSC Krasny Gidropress (Russian: Красный гидропресс) is a company based in Taganrog, Russia and established in 1907. It is currently part of Tactical Missiles Corporation.

The Taganrog Krasnyy Gidropress Plant, formerly a major supplier of propellers and other shipboard equipment to the Soviet Navy, is expanding production of household appliances.
