= Semyon Morozov =

Hero of the Soviet Union

Semyon Morozov Russian: Семён Григорьевич Морозов
- Born: 25 September 1914; Taganrog, Russian Empire
- Died: 23 February 1943 (aged 28); Taganrog, USSR
- Military career
- Allegiance: Soviet Union
- Awards: Hero of the Soviet Union

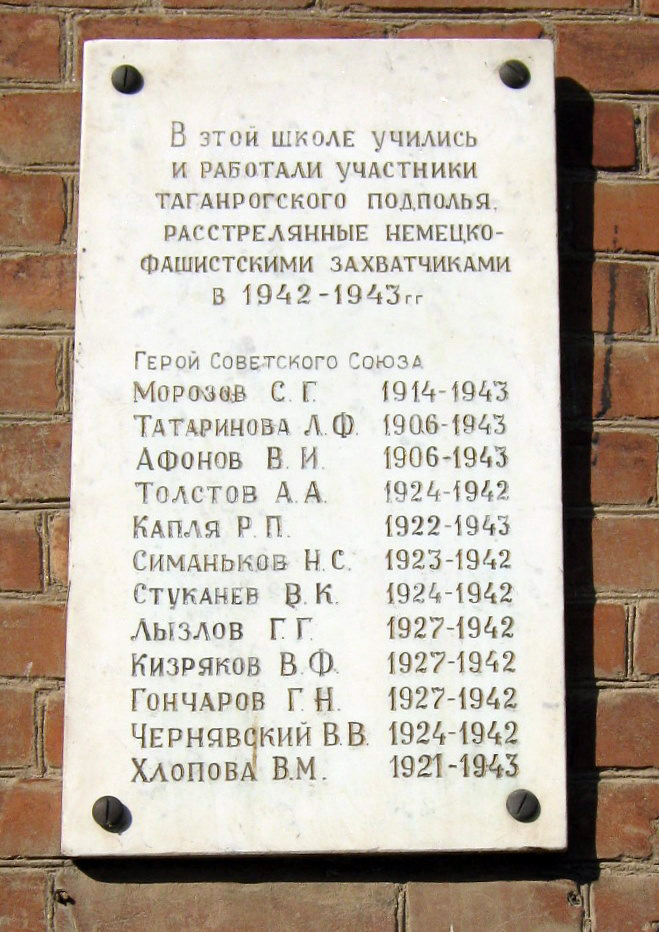
A commemorative plaque to the Taganrog underground resistance movement on the Mariinsky Gymnasium building in Taganrog. Semyon Grigoryevich Morozov is the honoree listed first.

Semyon Grigoryevich Morozov (Russian: Семён Григорьевич Морозов; 25 September [O.S. 12 September] 1914 – 23 February 1943) was commissar of the Taganrog antifascist underground organization (1941–1943). He was posthumously awarded the Hero of the Soviet Union title.

Semion Morozov studied at the Taganrog school No 15 for 7 years. In 1938, he graduated from the High Communist Agricultural School in Rostov-on-Don and was appointed chief of the Department of Agitation and Propaganda at the District Committee of Komsomol (Young Communist League) in the Kazanskaya stanitsa (Cossack village) of the Verkhnedonskoy District of the Rostov Oblast. In 1939 Morozov worked as deputy director at the Pioneers’ Club. Then he was appointed the chief of the department of propaganda and agitation at the City Committee of Komsomol. At the same time he studied at the Taganrog Teachers' College. Since 1941 he worked as the First Secretary of the City Committee. He was engaged in the organizational activities in the occupied Taganrog. He was arrested in February 1943 and shot to death in the Gully of Petrushino.

One of the streets in Taganrog was named after Semyon Morozov. A brass plaque is set on the wall of the house where he lived.

== See also ==
- Taganrog during World War II
