= Dmitri Sinodi-Popov =

Russian painter

Dmitri Minaevich Sinodi-Popov (Russian Дмитрий Минаевич Синоди-Попов) (1855 – 1910) was a Russian Empire artist of Greek descent.

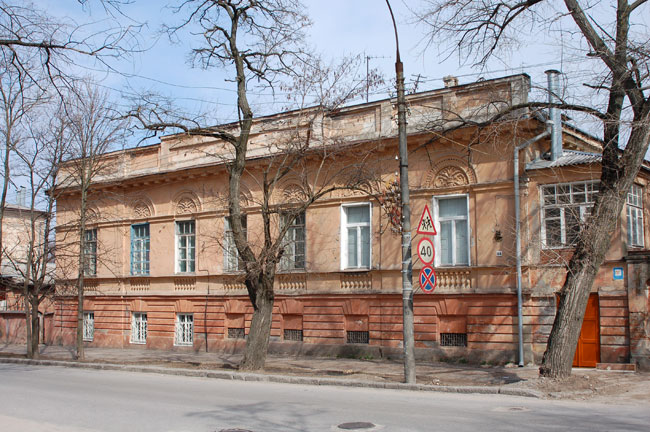
Birthhouse of Sinodi-Popov in Taganrog.

Dmitri Sinodi-Popov was born in the city of Taganrog, where he received a good education at home: violin, French, Italian and Greek languages and was very good at the visual arts. In 1870, Sinodi-Popov entered the St. Petersburg Academy of Arts, where the amateur artist acquired good practical skills, but he had to interrupt his studies because he was suffering from epilepsy.

In late 1870s, the artist returned to his home city of Taganrog, continued his art studies and painted a lot. Most of the sketches available at the Taganrog Museum of Art and Taganrog State Museum date back to late 1870s - early 1900s. Most of the visual heritage left by the artist is in the form of drawings. His portraits of local Greeks are very expressive: Portrait of Doctor Divaris, Greek Boy and An Old Greek (1870).

Starting from the 1880s, the artist worked in the context of Peredvizhniki traditions. The portrait of the artist Seraphima Blonskaya goes beyond the boundaries of its genre and transforms into a portrait-painting. The image of the young woman conveys seriousness and simplicity. Sinodi-Popov exhibited in Europe and his name became well-known, bringing new orders and fans. But with his illness progressing, the artist went for medical treatment to Rome and later Paris, where he died.

== Art of Sinodi-Popov ==
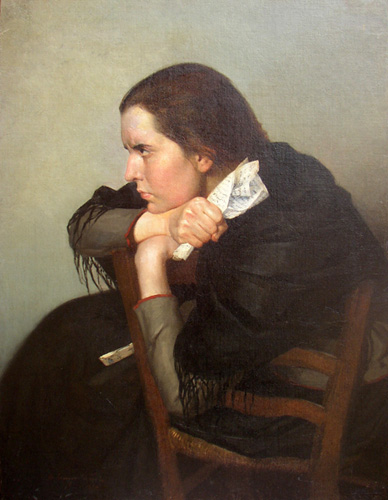
Portrait of the Artist Seraphima Blonskaya/The Letter, 1890 from the collection of Taganrog Museum of Art
