= Antonina Isaeva =

Politician

- Антоніна Ісаєва
- Born: Antonina Ivanovna Isaeva; 6 January 1947; Berezivka, Zolochiv Raion, Kharkiv Oblast, Ukrainian SSR, Soviet Union
- Occupations: Milkmaid; Politician
- Awards: Order of Lenin; Order of the October Revolution; Hero of Socialist Labour

Antonina Ivanovna Isaeva (Ukrainian: Антоніна Іванівна Ісаєва; born 6 January 1947) is a Ukrainian milkmaid and politician who worked at the S.M. Kirov Collective Farm in Zolochiv. She was a people's deputy of the Congress of People's Deputies of the Soviet Union from collective farms united by the Union Council of Collective Farms from 1989 to 1991. Iseva is a two-time recipient of the Order of Lenin and also received the Order of the October Revolution and the Hero of Socialist Labour.

== Biography ==
Isaeva was born in the village of Berezivka, Zolochiv Raion, Kharkiv Oblast, Ukrainian Soviet Socialist Republic on 6 January 1947. She received a secondary education. Isaeva was a machine milking operator and milkmaid at the S.M. Kirov Collective Farm in Zolochiv and worked to master animal husbandry. She was a winner of the socialist competition among milkmaids and regularly exceeded productions plans. Isaeva achieved the highest yields of milk in her group and preserved offspring during the eleventh five-year plan.

She was a member of the Communist Party of the Soviet Union (CPSU). From 1989 to 1991, Isaeva was a people's deputy of the Congress of People's Deputies of the Soviet Union from collective farms united by the Union Council of Collective Farms. She ceased to be a member of the CPSU in 1991.

== Awards ==
Isaeva is a two-time recipient of the Order of Lenin in 1971 and 1986. In 1976, she was awarded the Order of the October Revolution. Isaeva also received the Hero of Socialist Labour and the "Hammer and Sickle" gold medal among other medals.
