= Seraphima Blonskaya =

Ukrainian artist (1870–1947)

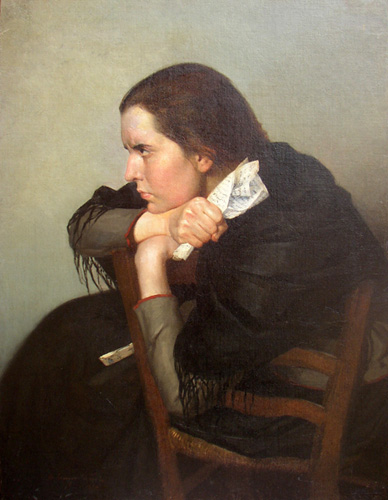
- portrait by Dmitri Sinodi-Popov, from Taganrog Museum of Art
- Born: October 3, 1870; Verkhnodniprovsk, Ukraine
- Died: August 9, 1947 (aged 76); Taganrog, USSR
- Education: Imperial Academy of Arts, Saint Petersburg
- Known for: Painting, Drawing
- Movement: Realism
- Spouse: Alexander Leontovski

Seraphima Iasonovna Blonskaya (Leontovskaya) (Russian: Блонская, Серафима Иасоновна, 3 October 1870 – 9 August 1947) was a Russian artist and art teacher.

Seraphima Blonskaya was born on October 3, 1870, in Verkhnodniprovsk of Yekaterinoslav Governorate, Russian Empire (now in Ukraine). In 1875 her family moved to Taganrog. In 1887 Blonskaya graduated with a golden medal from the Mariinskaya Gymnasium and entered the Art School of Mykola Burachek in Kiev that she finished in 1891. In 1892-1900, she studied at the Imperial Academy of Arts in Saint Petersburg. In 1900 Blonskaya was honored with the title of the artist for her degree work painting The Girls (Palm Sunday).

In 1909 Blonskaya returned to Taganrog with her husband artist Leontovski, and in 1910 they founded an art school. After the death of her husband in 1928, the school was closed. In 1930s Seraphima Blonskaya worked at the art union Vsekohudozhnik, since 1944 - at the Taganrog department of the Art Fund of RSFSR. Most paintings of Blonskaya are exhibited at the Taganrog Museum of Art.

Seraphima Blonskaya died in Taganrog on August 9, 1947, and was buried at the Taganrog Old Cemetery. In 1990s one of the children's art schools in Taganrog was named after Blonskaya.
