= 31st Rifle Division =

- Active: 1925 – 1946
- Disbanded: July 1946
- Country: Soviet Union
- Branch: Red Army
- Type: Infantry
- Size: Division
- Engagements: World War II
- Decorations: Order of the Red Banner; Order of Suvorov, 2nd class; Order of Bogdan Khmelnitsky, 2nd class
- Battle honours: Stalingrad

Commanders
- Notable commanders: Mikhail Ozimin; Pyotr Bogdanovich

The 31st Rifle Division was an infantry division of the Soviet Union's Red Army during the interwar period and World War II.

Formed in 1925 near Stalingrad, the division was garrisoned in the city until 1940, when it was transferred to Yerevan to strengthen the Iranian and Turkish borders. The 31st remained there until October, when it was sent north to the Black Sea coast and fought in the Battle of Rostov. During Case Blue in mid-1942 the division retreated south into the Caucasus, then advanced north beginning at the end of the war when the German retreat from the region began. In the northern hemisphere spring of 1943 it was relocated north, fighting in the Battle of the Dnieper late that year. It fought in the Second Jassy–Kishinev Offensive in the summer of 1944 and advanced into Romania before being transferred to Poland and fighting in the Vistula–Oder Offensive in early 1945. It fought in the Berlin Offensive and was disbanded postwar in western Ukraine in mid-1946.

== History ==
=== Interwar period ===
The division was formed in the area of the villages of Kalach, Prutboy, Kalitva, Nizhny Charskaya, and Verkhne Charskaya from the 93rd Red Banner Rifle Regiment near Stalingrad, part of the Volga Military District, on 2 October 1925. On 29 April 1927 it received the honorific "Stalingrad" after moving to the city. In that year the 31st included the 91st Astrakhan, 92nd Leningrad, and 93rd Don Rifle Regiments. The 31st remained part of the district until January 1940, when it was relocated to Yerevan and became part of the Transcaucasian Military District. It was also stationed near Gusar, Khachmas, and Quba. The division's main body, excluding the headquarters, moved to the Iranian and Turkish borders in April, engaging in strengthening the border defenses by building roads and fortifications.

=== World War II ===
The division began World War II in the district's 40th Rifle Corps alongside the 9th Rifle Division. It included the 75th, 177th, and the 248th Rifle Regiments, as well as the 32nd Light Artillery Regiment and the 104th Sapper Battalion. In July it became part of the newly formed 45th Army, covering the Turkish border. After the Red Army suffered heavy losses in the Battle of Kiev and in the Donbas, the 31st was one of the divisions sent north to fill the gap. By 12 October, it was at Taganrog on the coast of the Black Sea, assigned to the Taganrog Group, which became part of the 56th Army in November. With the army, the division fought in the Battle of Rostov and on the Mius during the winter of 1941–1942.

When Case Blue, the German summer offensive of 1942, began, the army and the division retreated into the Caucasus. In July it was transferred to the 12th Army and in August to the North Caucasian Front's 18th Army. The 31st suffered heavy losses in the defense of Tuapse, and on 29 August it was reinforced by the 818th Rifle Regiment, formed from the remnants of the 9th NKVD Motorized Division, which replaced the disbanded 177th Regiment. At the end of the year, when the German retreat from the Caucasus began after their defeat in the Battle of Stalingrad, the division was transferred to the 46th Army, advancing north along the Black Sea coast.

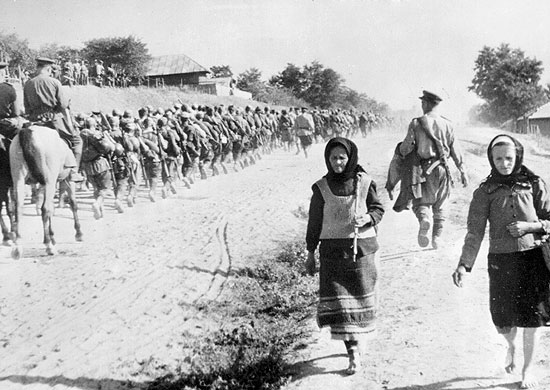
Soviet troops on the march in Romania

Between March and May 1943, the 46th Army and the 31st Division were moved north in the Reserve of the Supreme High Command (RVGK), joining the Southwestern Front. The division remained with the army in the front, which became the 3rd Ukrainian Front on 20 October, until the end of 1943. During the Battle of the Dnieper, the division was transferred to the 2nd Ukrainian Front's 4th Guards Army. It advanced into Romania in the Second Jassy–Kishinev Offensive with the front during July and August 1944, mostly part of the 4th Guards Army. In September, the division was withdrawn to the RVGK with the 52nd Army's 78th Rifle Corps. The division went back into combat in October with the corps and army, part of the 1st Ukrainian Front.

From January 1945, it fought in the Vistula–Oder Offensive. In February, the 32nd Artillery Regiment was equipped with twenty 76 mm divisional gun M1942 (ZiS-3) and twelve 122 mm howitzer M1938 (M-30), practically full strength by the 1942–1943 tables of equipment and organization, but the regiment's vehicle park was very diverse, incorporating 29 Lend-Lease Studebaker US6 2½-ton 6x6 trucks, a 1½-ton Lend-Lease Chevrolet G506 truck, five Soviet-made trucks, four captured German trucks, and six Soviet tractors. Towards the end of the war, despite a chronic shortage of riflemen, the division's artillery remained at full strength. The division fought in the Berlin Offensive in April. From 6 to 11 May, the 31st fought in the Prague Offensive, during which the army advanced south into Czechoslovakia from Bunzlau, reaching the Labe River northeast of Prague by the end of the operation. During the war, it was awarded the Order of the Red Banner, the Order of Suvorov 2nd class, and the Order of Bogdan Khmelnitsky 2nd class.

=== Postwar ===
The division and its corps were relocated to Poland with the 52nd Army in the area of Kielce, Częstochowa, and Kraków in June. It became part of the Northern Group of Forces there. In the fall of 1945, the army and the 31st Division with the corps were relocated to the Slavuta in the Lvov Military District in western Ukraine. The division was disbanded in July 1946 along with the corps in the Carpathian Military District.

== Commanders ==
The following officers are known to have commanded the division:

- Mikhail Khozin (September 1925–September 1926)
- Colonel (promoted to Major General 27 December 1941) Mikhail Ozimin (7 April 1938–9 August 1942)
- Major General Stanislav Ivanovsky (10 August–3 September 1942)
- Colonel Georgy Serov (4 September–12 October 1942)
- Colonel (promoted to Major General 28 March 1943) Pyotr Bogdanovich (13 October 1942–2 December 1943)
- Colonel Konstantin Kiryushin (3–8 December 1943)
- Major General Pyotr Bogdanovich (9 December 1943–9 February 1944)
- Colonel Ivan Khilchevsky (10 February 1944–11 May 1945)
