= Monument to Peter I =

Monument to Peter I or Monument to Peter the Great may refer to:

- Peter the Great Statue, monument in Moscow sculpted by Russian architect Zurab Tsereteli
- Monument to Peter I (St. Michael's Castle), monument in Saint Petersburg sculpted by Francesco Bartolomeo Rastrelli
- Peter I Monument in Taganrog, sculpted by Mark Antokolski
