= Memorials of the Great Patriotic War in Aksay region =

The Aksay region in Russia contains several memorials and sculptures dedicated to the soldiers who fought in World War II, called the Great Patriotic War (term) in Russia. These memorials serve as a tribute to the thousands of soldiers from the Aksay region who fought during Operation Barbarossa between 1941 and 1942.

== The "Crossing" Monument ==
The "Crossing" monument is located on Guleva street in Aksay. In 1985, for the 40th anniversary of Victory Day, a ZiS truck was erected with anti-aircraft guns on a concrete platform here. The monument is dedicated to the defence of a railway bridge and pontoon crossing the Don River in October 1941 – July 1942. These both had strategic importance for Soviet troops during the retreat in the autumn of 1941. The monument is dedicated to the Soviet anti-aircraft gunners who defended the railway and pontoon bridges

The commander of the battery of 37-mm guns, Boris Dmitrievich Yalovkin, said on the 30th anniversary of Victory Day, "In October 1941, 593 separate anti-aircraft and artillery battalions, under the command of Senior lieutenant Anatoliy Ivanovich Kurakin, broke out of Taganrog during World War II. They then defended the bridge and pontoon near the settlement of Kobyakov (Russian: Кобяково городище). Using these crossings, ammunition, food, and medicine were delivered to the defending units of the Red Army on the Western bank of the Don River. Civilians, wounded soldiers, and agricultural resources were evacuated. The crossing was defended by 37 mm and 85 mm anti-aircraft guns, shielded by M4 autocannon emplacements. One of the batteries under the command of Senior Lieutenant Verbitskiy was defending the left Bank of the Don River. During the invasions of Nazi troops on November 21–22, the battery stubbornly withstood the tank attacks of the enemy."

As a direct result of the defence of the airspace in the area of both crossings, German forces failed to carry out any successful bombings, and the crossing fulfilled its purpose.

A mass grave of five soldiers was originally located at the site of the monument. During the monument's construction, the soldiers were reburied at Heroes' Square, a separate war memorial site with an Eternal flame.

== Memorial complex at the Square of Heroes in Aksay ==
Memorial complex is located on the site of the mass grave of the Great Patriotic War. It was opened on 9 May 1975. The memorial structures were erected in honour of the 12 inhabitants of Aksay who were awarded the title of Hero of the Soviet Union. Among them: twice hero of the Soviet Union N. D. Gulaev, Heroes Of The Soviet Union A.V. Guba, A.E. Dubikov, G. A. Zagorinsky, M. V. Kovalyov, V. I., Moskalenko, G. S. Petrovskiy, P. P. Primakov, V. D. Rezanov, A. H. Roy (monument to Aleksey Khrisanfovich was opened quite recently - on 22 June 2016 - the same year he died [3]), F. Y. Rubakho, P. E. Tatarkin. On 14 February 1983, the 40th anniversary of the liberation of the city and the Aksay district, a solemn opening of the second part of the memorial marble plaques was held. These plaques contained lists of names of those who had not returned from the war.

== Monument to N. D. Gulaev ==
On 10 July 1949, a bronze bust of Nikolai Dmitrievich Gulaev was erected in the park on the central Square of Heroes. Nikolai Gulaev was a fighter pilot and a twice Hero of the Soviet Union. During the years of the War, he arranged 250 combat flights, led 69 air battles, and shot down 57 enemy aircraft himself. The Aksay school No. 1 as well as the military–historical complex of the city Museum were named after him.

== Memorial to the dead soldiers in Verkhnepodpol'nyy khutor ==
The memorial to the dead soldiers in Verkhnepodpol’nyy khutor (Russian: хутор) was erected in 1996. In July 1942, German forces entered the khutors in the South part of the Rostov region. The elderly, women, and children were enslaved. Nazis took out all the grain harvest of 1942. On 23 January, the corps of the 24th Guards Rifle Division started a heavy fight against enemy tanks and foot troops near the khutor. The corps of the 3rd Guards Division and of the 87th Rifle Division arrived as reinforcements. Heavy fights for the khutor lasted until 9 February 1943. Germans were driven out, but almost everything in the khutor was destroyed by them. After the liberation people began to settle at the higher territory where during the postwar years appeared a village.

== Memorial to the past inhabitants of the stanitsa (Grushevskaya stanitsa) ==
During the years of the Great Patriotic War, many inhabitants went to fight from the Grushevskaya stanitsa (Russian: станица) to protect their homeland. 257 soldiers did not come back home from the battlefield. Liberators of the Grushevskaya stanitsa were buried in the mass grave, where in 1959 a memorial was erected as well as plaques with the names of those who had died in the war. [6]

== Memorial to the defenders of the Lenin Khutor who died in 1943 (Russian: Памятник защитникам хутора Ленина, погибшим в 1943 году) ==
At the break of dawn on 20 January 1943 an avant-garde of the mechanized corps of the lieutenant general Rotmistrov (Third guard Kotelnikov tank corps) entered the Khutor. Their aim was to destroy German transport airplanes at the aerodrome near Bataysk. German fascists were going to use the airplanes to deliver food supplies and clothes to the grouping of Paulus surrounded in Stalingrad. The goal was achieved, but only one tank came back, and 20 Red Army soldiers were buried in the mass grave, near which the memorial is stood nowadays.

== Mass grave of the soldiers, who died during The Great Patriotic War in Voroshilov khutor ==
In the summer of 1942, while the dwellers of the Khutor were doing military defense works, German warplanes came from Taganrog side. They dropped bombs and directed machine-gun fire towards the dwelling. 240 Nazi bombs were dropped on the khutor. They destroyed commercial-dairy farms, horse stables, cemetery etc. 26 khutor dwellers, mainly children, were shot or brutally tortured by Nazi during their invasion. Their and the other frontline soldiers’ names were carved on the marble plaque of the memorial, which is erected in the khutor's park.

== Memorials in Bolshoi Log Khutor ==
In November 1941 Germans entered Bolshoi Log. The first time they spent 7 days there and the second time in 1942 they didn't leave for 6 months. In the beginning of February 1943 the Germans, who took the best houses in Rekonstruktor sovkhoz (Russian: совхоз, abbreviated from советское хозяйство, “Soviet farm”), started to dig trenches from the wine factory to Bolshoi Log Khutor. In February–March 1941 The Soviet Armed Forces came close to the railway. The place was very exposed and the soldiers were out in the open. Germans fired them with machine-gun fire and finished off those who were alive in the morning. The frontline soldiers fell, but the rest of them continued to attack. A great deal of Red Army soldiers died in this battle. Only at night Germans left the trench lines. There were a lot of wounded soldiers, they could have been rescued, but the night was so cold that most froze to death. However, some of them managed to survive. The dead soldiers were buried in three graves: the first one is at the territory of the wine factory, the second one in the schoolyard (where the cemetery is located now) and the third one at the territory of the current Bolshelogskaya school. The fight lasted from 9 to 11 February 1943 and only on the 12 February Bolshoi Log khutor was liberated.

Nowadays there are 2 mass graves and 4 monuments. 445 soldiers were buried in Bolshoi Log mass grave and 250 ones in Rekonsrtuktor village.
