= Gully of Petrushino =

Site of a 1941–1943 massacre in Russia

Coordinates: 47.1910°N 38.8674°E

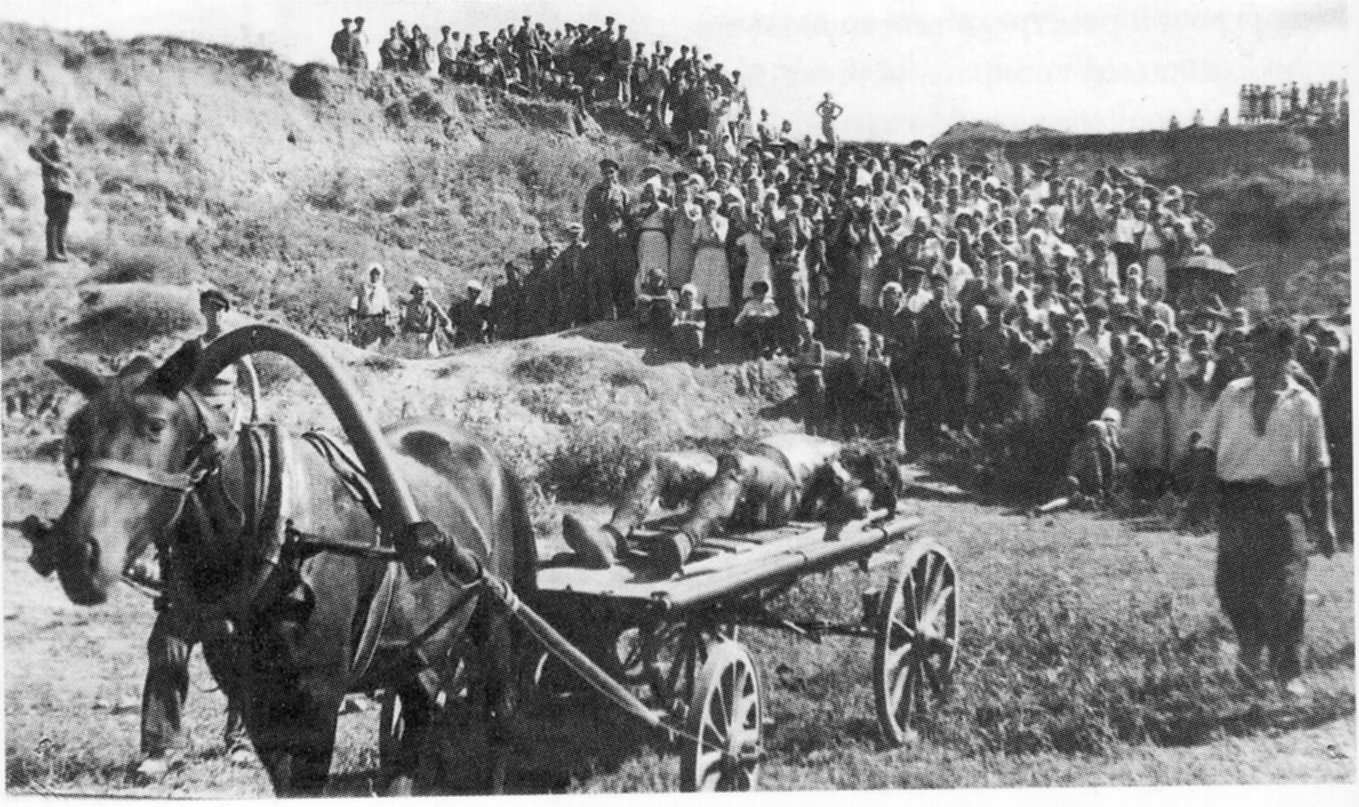
- Early September 1943. German atrocities discovered at Gully of Petrushino, Taganrog
- Also known as: Gully of Death
- Location: Outskirts of Taganrog, near Beriev Aircraft Company
- Date: 1941–1943
- Incident type: Genocide
- Perpetrators: Otto Ohlendorf, Kurt Christmann
- Organizations: Einsatzgruppe D, Sonderkommando 10a, Russian Auxiliary Police
- Victims: Over 7,000 Soviet civilians and POWs, and members of the Taganrog resistance movement
- Memorials: memorial complex “Борцы” on site

Gully of Petrushino (Russian: Петрушинская балка), or Gully of Death (Балка смерти from German: Todesschlucht), is a site on the outskirts of Taganrog, Russia, at which 7,000 Soviet civilians, mostly Jews, were massacred between 1941 and 1943 by the German army, with the assistance of non-German divisions, during their occupation of Taganrog.

== Background ==
On October 17, 1941, the armored divisions SS Division Wiking and 1st SS Division Leibstandarte SS Adolf Hitler of 1st Panzer Group arrived on the outskirts of Taganrog and several panzers made breakthrough to the seaport and opened fire at gunboats "Krenkel" and "Rostov-Don" and the last transport ship evacuating women and children. The city was left by the Red Army on October 22, 1941.

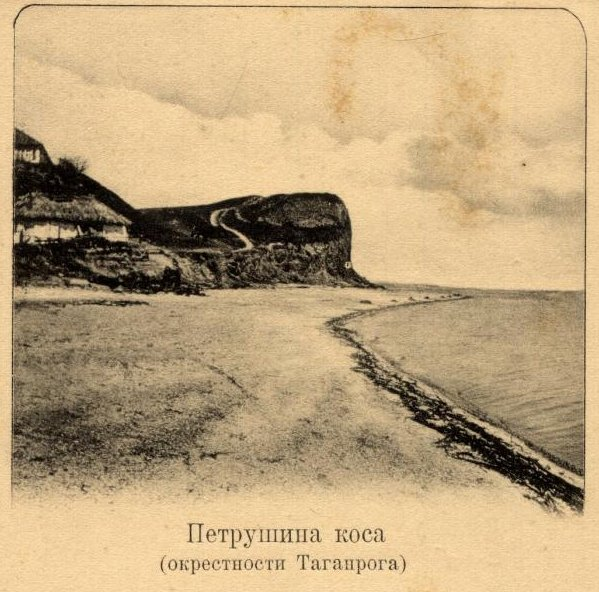
Spit of Petrushino on a 19th-century postcard

Petrushino is a thin sand spit on the Gulf of Taganrog, Azov Sea on the Southwestern outskirts of Taganrog. The Gully of Petrushino is a quarry situated near Beriev Aircraft Company, which was formed in the early 20th century after extractions of clay for a no longer existing brickworks.

== Massacres ==
The SS Einsatzgruppe Sonderkommando 10a performed systematic genocide of Taganrog citizens from the first days of occupation. The large groups of citizens (old men, women, communists, young communists, gypsies, Jews, and anyone suspected in aiding the Taganrog resistance movement) were taken from Vladimirskaya Plaza in Taganrog to Petrushino village (near Beriev) and shot in the Gully of Petrushino (Todesschlucht).

The massacres in Taganrog started with the Final Solution of the Jewish question. On October 22, 1941 the Ortskommandant issued an order for all Jewish people to wear a Star of David sign and to register at the Ortskommandantur. It was followed by Appeal to the Jewish Population of Taganrog signed by the Ortskommandant Alberti. The "appeal" was calling all Jews to assemble on October 29, 1941 at 8:00 a.m. on Vladimirskaya Plaza in Taganrog from where they were supposed to be taken to a ghetto. Alberti explained this measure as necessary due to alleged rise of antisemitism among local population, and that the German police and Gestapo would better manage the question if the Jewish population were separated into a certain district of the city:

In order to implement this measure, the Jews of both sexes and of all ages, including the persons born of marriages between Jews and not-Jews must be present on Wednesday, October 29, 1941 at 8 o'clock in the morning at Vladimirskaya Ploshad of Taganrog.

All Jews must have documents and hand in the keys to currently occupied houses and flats. A pasteboard tag with full names and full address must be attached to the keys by a wire or a lace. We highly recommend the Jews to take with them all valuables and cash...(excerpt)

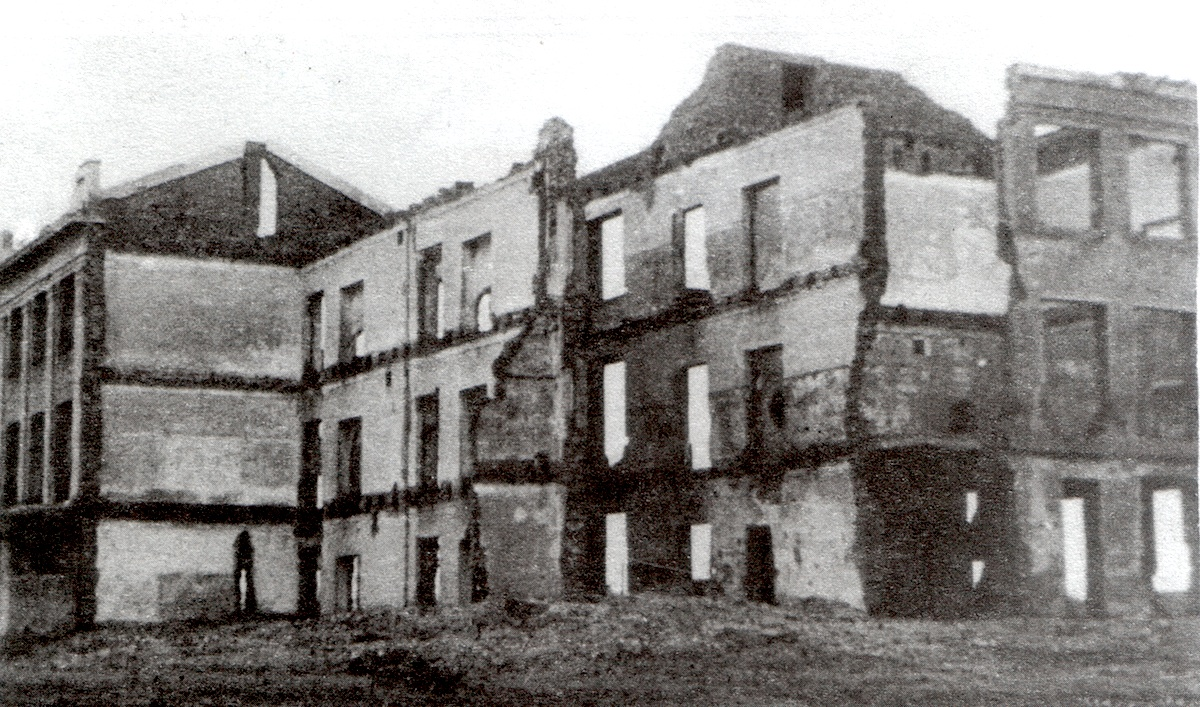
Ruins of the Taganrog school no.27 in 1943. This is the building where the Jews of Taganrog came to register prior to be taken to the Gully of Petrushino.

On October 29, 1941 all Jews of Taganrog (around 2,500 people) were gathered on Vladimirskaya Plaza, promptly registered at the building of the school no.27 in front of Vladimirskaya Plaza and taken by trucks to the Gully of Petrushino near Beriev Aircraft Factory, where they were shot to death by Schutzmannschaft collaborationists under control of Otto Ohlendorf's Einsatzgruppe D. Of all the Jewish children who lived in Taganrog in 1941 only a 14‑year-old boy Volodya Kobrin (Russian: Кобрин, Владимир Моисеевич) managed to escape the certain death, thanks to the help of various people in Taganrog and especially Anna Mikhailovna Pokrovskaya, who was awarded the title of the Righteous among the Nations by Aliza Shenhar, Ambassador of Israel in Russia on July 19, 1996.

On August 21, 1943, one week prior to Taganrog's liberation by Red Army, 80 citizens (workers, women and young people) were shot to death on the seashore of Gulf of Taganrog, on the Spit of Petrushino.

Estimates of the total number killed at both Gully of Petrushino and in the city of Taganrog during the Nazi occupation vary. According to the information of the State Archive, some 7,000 Taganrogers (1,500 of them children of various ages) were shot to death in the Gully of Petrushino. However, most modern sources estimate the number to be at least 10,000 and more.

== Investigation ==
After the liberation of Taganrog, on September 1, 1943 the mass grave of citizens murdered in the Gully of Petrushino was publicly examined. The Secretary of the Taganrog City Communist Party committee Alexander Zobov held a speech before the gathered citizens. The medical commission permitted the exhumation of 31 dead bodies from the upper level.

After the war, Ohlendorf was prosecuted in the Einsatzgruppen trial and sentenced to death. He was executed in 1951.

== Remembrance ==
In August 1945 a modest obelisk was placed on the common grave in the Gully of Death. The work on the project of a large memorial complex was started in 1965. In May–July 1967 the project of a memorial complex designed by architects from Rostov on Don was displayed for public at the Taganrog's house of culture. Although the project was favorably received, it was not implemented.

The next design was suggested by the architect Vladimir Pavlovich Grachev, which was partially realized in 1973 for the 40th anniversary of Taganrog's liberation by the Red Army. The stela is 18 meters high, the size of the hand from the index finger to the foundation is 4 meters. The first name of the composition was "Victims" (Russian: «Жертвы»), but after several discussions it was changed into "Fighters" («Борцы»).

On 30 August 1997, a memorial commemorating the Jewish men, women and children from Taganrog who were shot to death in the ravine by German SS Einsatzgruppen units in October 1941 was dedicated on initiative of the Jewish community of Taganrog.

Every year the day of Taganrog's liberation, on August 30 delegations of Taganrog local government officials and workers, war veterans, survivors of the Nazi occupation, school students, clergy visit the complex, where commemorative events are held.

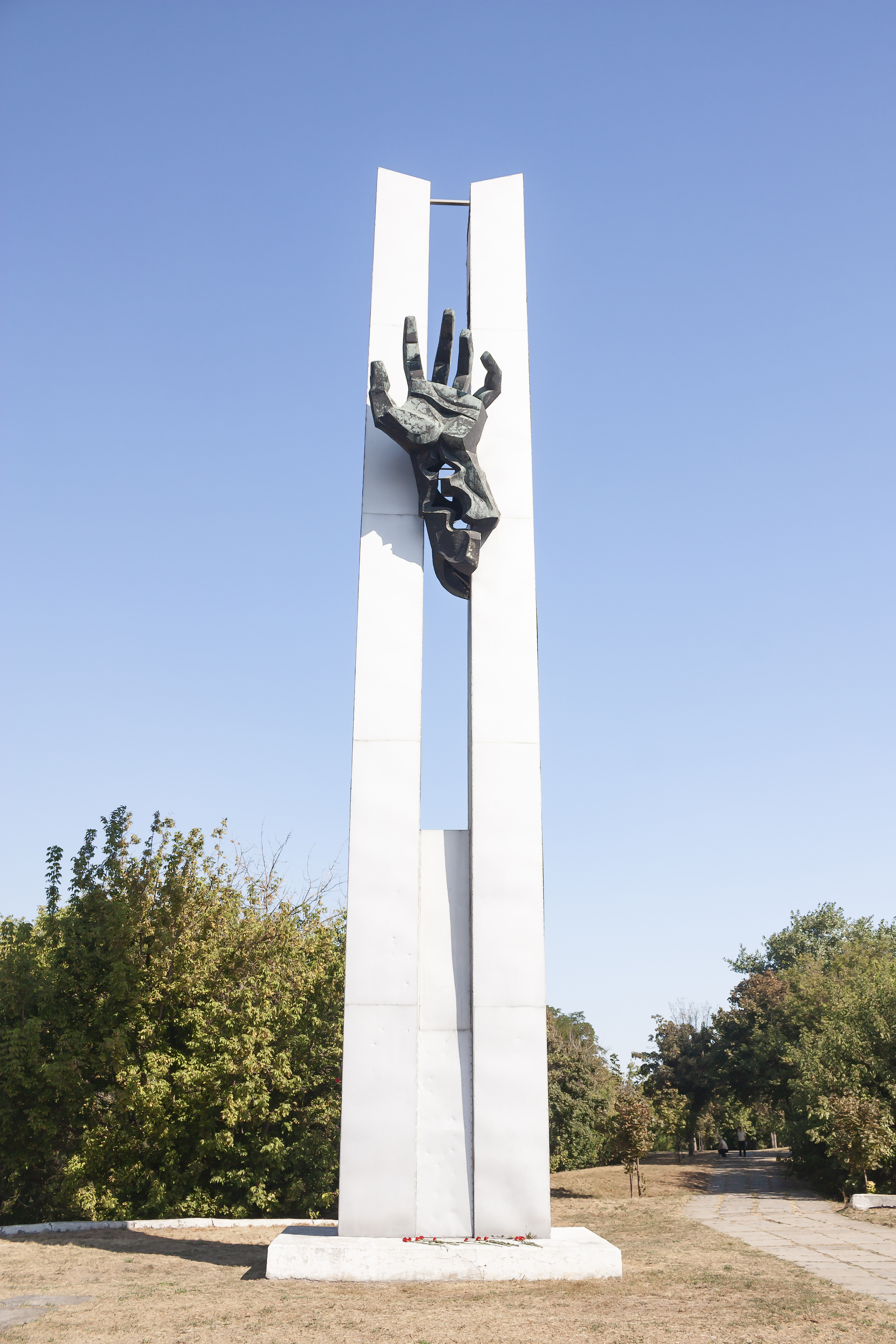
Monument "Fighters"

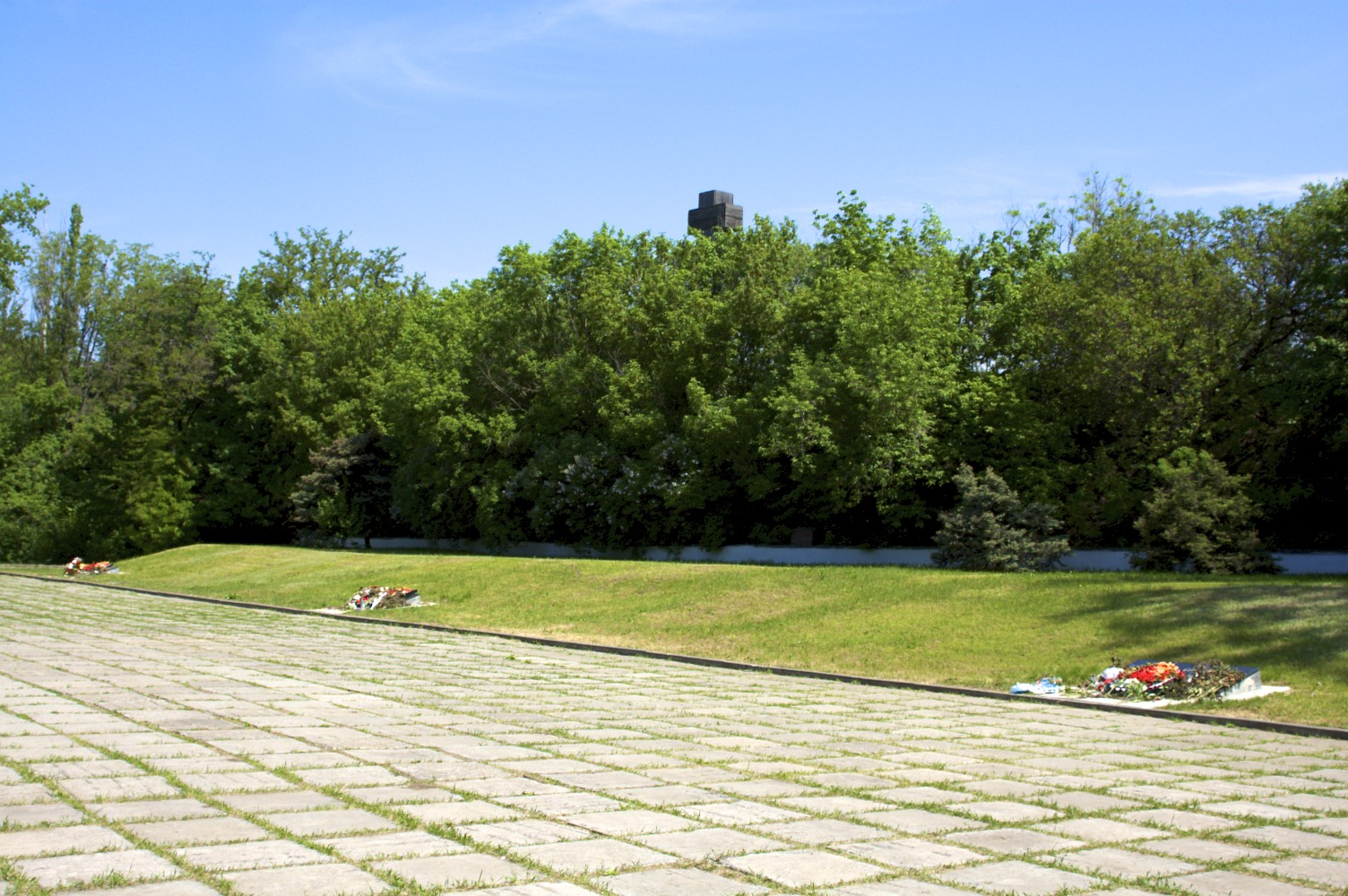
View of the memorial

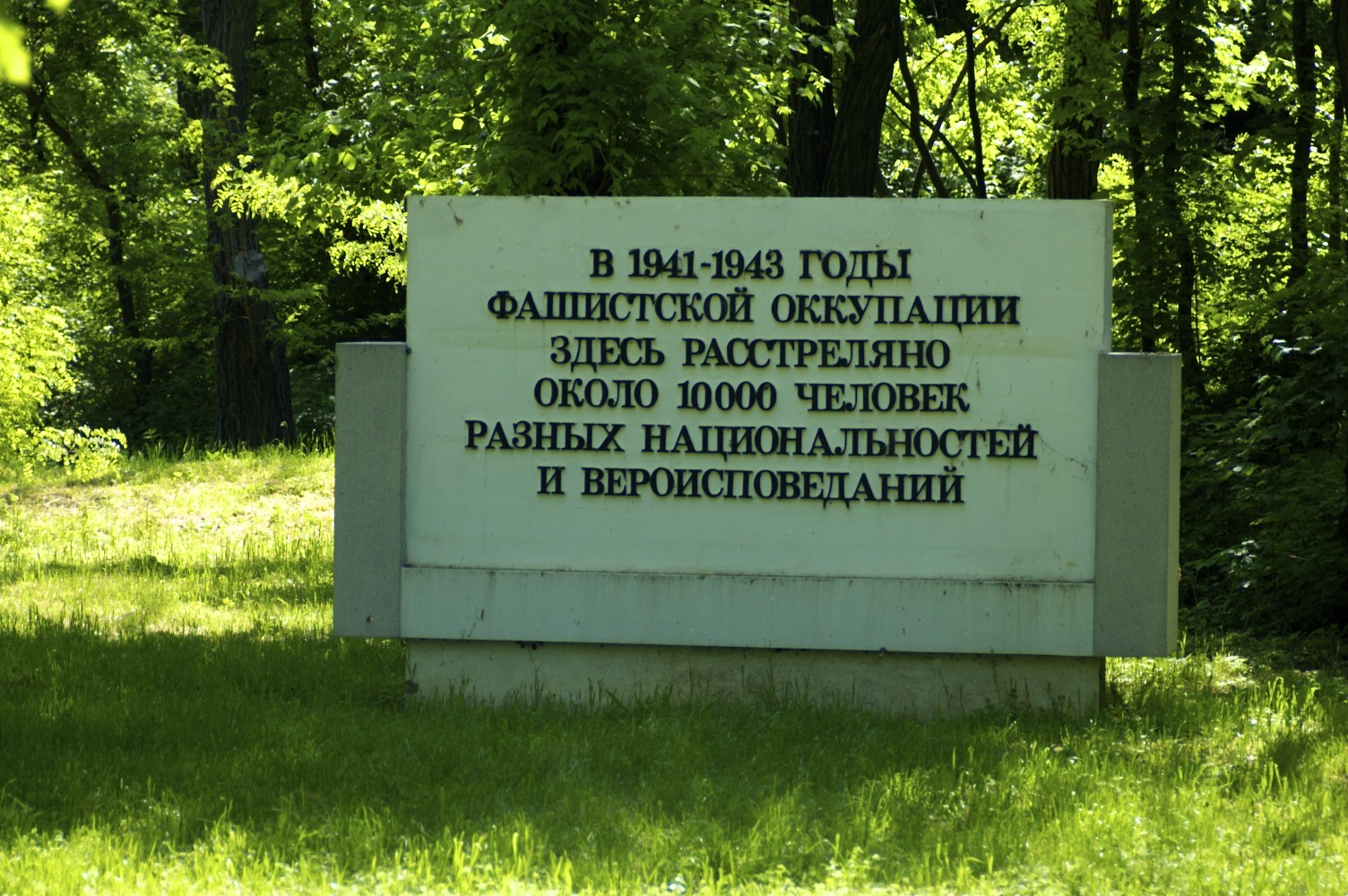
Memorial stone (reads: "around 10,000 people of various nationalities and religious beliefs were shot to death here during fascist occupation")

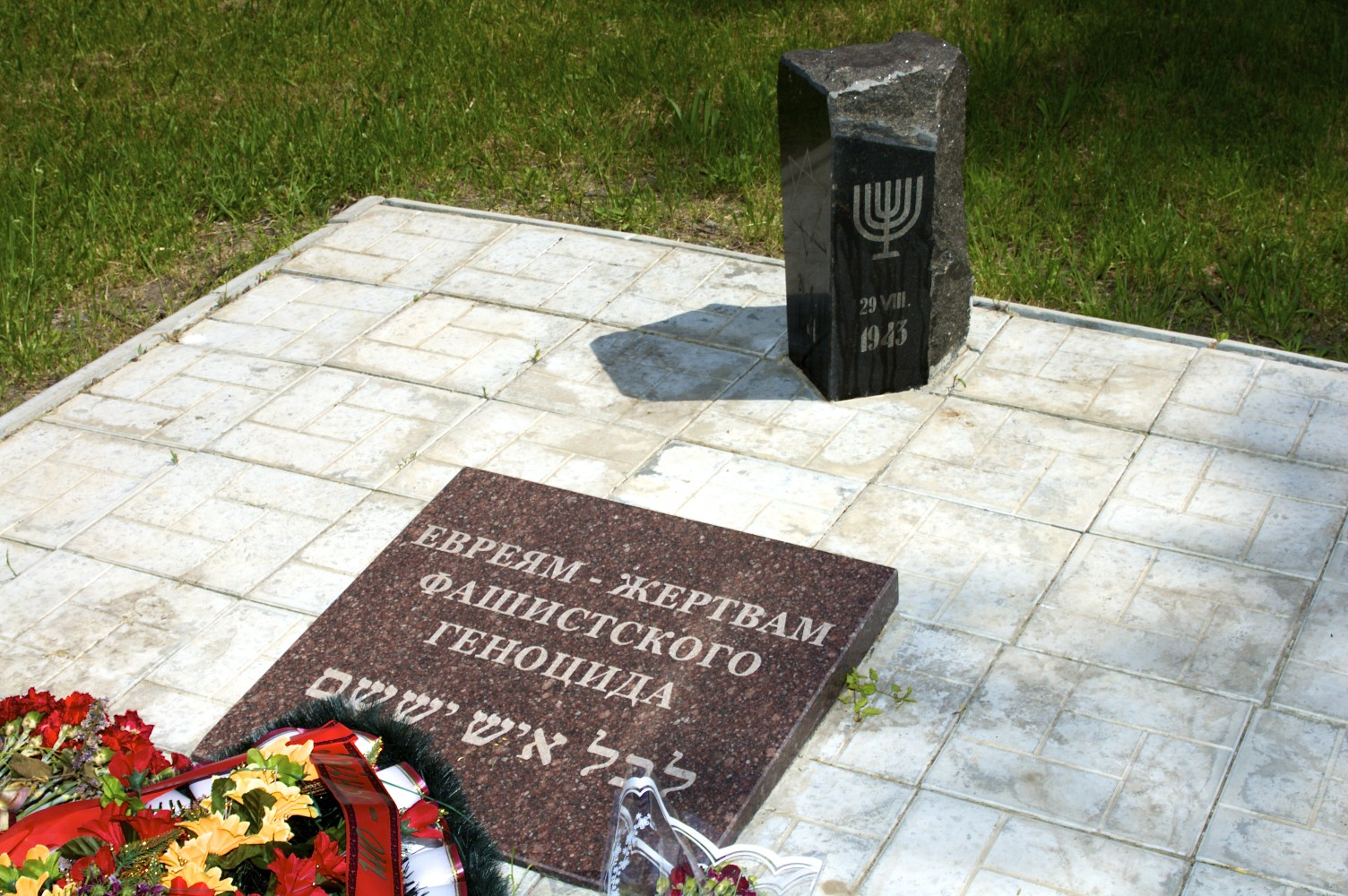
Memorial plaque to Jewish population in the Gully of Death

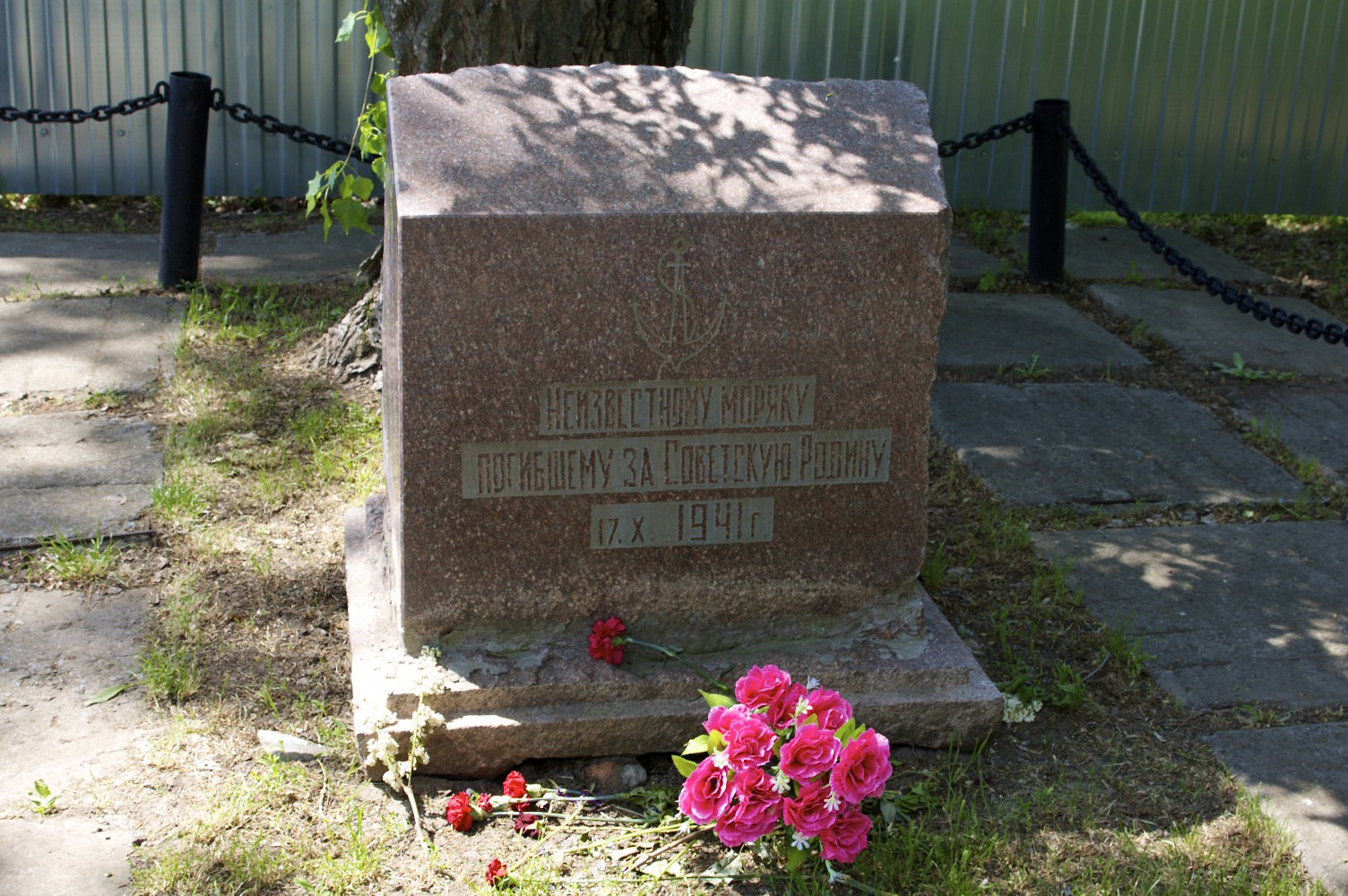
Memorial stone to an unknown sailor

== In fiction ==
The events at the Gully of Death (Gully of Petrushino) are described in the novel Heroes of Taganrog by Soviet writer Genrikh Borisovich Gofman.

== See also ==
- Taganrog during World War II
- History of Taganrog

== External links and references ==
- Таганрог. Энциклопедия, Таганрог, издательство АНТОН, 2008
- Балка смерти
- photographs of several memorials on the site of the Gully of Petrushino
