= Taganrog during World War II =

- Part of World War II
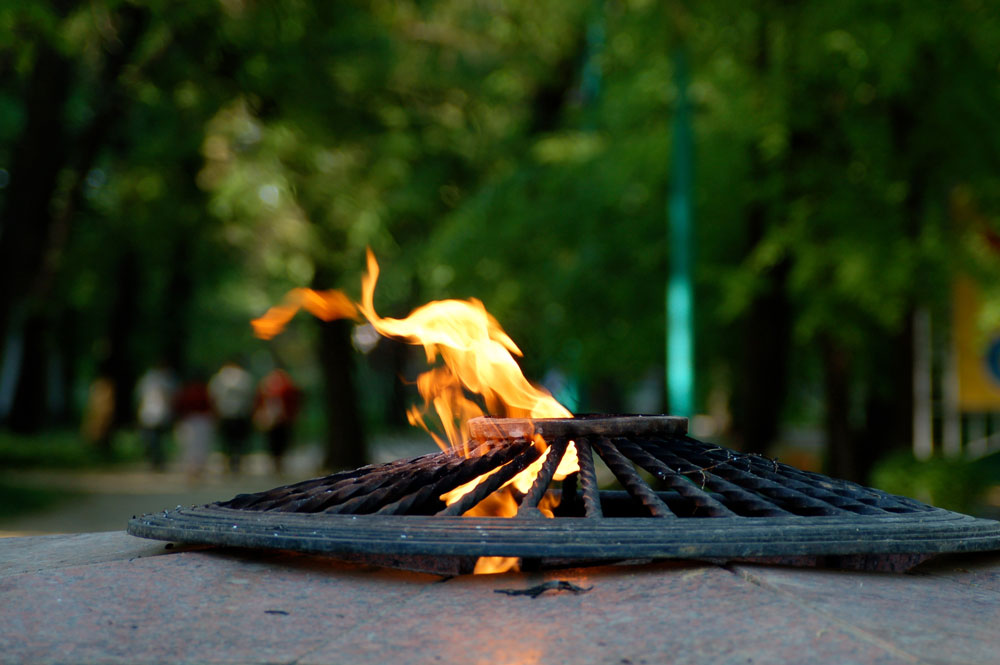
- Eternal flame in Taganrog's Gorky Park
Date	1941–1945
Location	Taganrog, Soviet Union

Belligerents
Nazi Germany	Soviet Union

The Soviet city of Taganrog, now part of the Rostov Oblast of the Russian Federation, had an eventful history during World War II, from 1941 to 1945.

== Defense of Taganrog ==
In July 1941 the municipal Communist Party Committee ordered the creation of the 44th Home Guards detachment from communists working at the city's factories to defend Taganrog. The detachment was under command of NKVD lieutenant Pyotr Gerasimov.

In the summer months of 1941, the "Taganrog Instrumental Factory named after J. Stalin" began production of artillery shells. In the spring of 1941, the State Aviation Factory no.31 began producing the brand-new fighters LAGG-3, later increasing the number of planes assembled to at least six airplanes per day following the opening of the Eastern Front. The "Taganrog factory named after Molotov" ("Krasny Gidropress") produced mines and spare parts for tanks.

On August 30–31, 1941, the city of Taganrog was bombed by Luftwaffe planes.

On September 15, 1941, the Rostov Oblast Communist Party Committee gave instructions for the organization of defense and underground resistance in case of occupation. A municipal defense committee was established in Taganrog, which controlled the evacuation of the population and military equipment from defense factories. The defense was held by 31st Rifle Division (Soviet Union) under command of Mikhail Ozimin and the 44th Home Guards detachment.

== Evacuation of Taganrog ==
On June 27, 1941 the State Communist Party Committee and Sovnarkom ordered the evacuation of industrial enterprises, agricultural resources, material and cultural values from the areas in the proximity of the front-line.

On October 4, 1941 the first train from Taganrog, carrying the dismantled equipment of the Instrumental Factory named after J. Stalin (later – Taganrog Combine Factory), left for Novosibirsk. On October 9, 1941 the State Aviation Factory no.31 started preparations for evacuation to relocate the production of LAGG-3 (including 3000 workers with families and over 50 nearly finished LAGG-3 "assembly kits") to Tbilisi. On October 10, 1941 the Kransny Kotelshik factory started the evacuation of its equipment for Zlatoust of Chelyabinsk Oblast. On October 15, 1941 the Taganrog Metallurgical Pipe Factory finished its evacuation for Kamensk-Uralsky in Ural. "The factory named after Molotov" was evacuated to Petropavlovsk (today part of Kazakhstan).

The Evacuation Hospital no.2097 located in Taganrog was evacuated on October 9 for Makhachkala.

By October 15, 1941 around 70–75% of equipment and products of Taganrog factories, as well as most workers were evacuated from the city.

== Occupation ==
On October 17, 1941, the armored divisions SS Division Wiking and 1st SS Division Leibstandarte SS Adolf Hitler of 1st Panzer Group arrived on the outskirts of Taganrog and several tanks made a breakthrough to the seaport and opened fire at gunboats "Krenkel" and "Rostov-Don" and the last transport ship evacuating women and children. According to Sovinformburo, the Germans lost around 35,000 soldiers and officers during the fight for Taganrog. According to German sources, on the way from Mariupol to Taganrog, the German army lost 138 dead and 479 wounded. During the takeover of Taganrog, I./LSSAH captured 510 war prisoners, 29 artillery pieces, 8 antitank guns, 29 heavy machine-guns. The gunboat "Krenkel" was heavily damaged and sunk in the harbour of the Taganrog seaport.

During the occupation, the local government system was replaced by Bürgermeisteramt or "New Russian local government" and the city was divided into four police sectors controlled by "Ortskommendatur" and personally by SS-Sturmbannführer Dr. Kurt Christmann of Einsatzkommando SS-Sonderkommando 10a. Sicherheitsdienst headquarters were stationed at the Chekhov Gymnasium.

In the summer-fall campaign of 1942 the headquarters of the VIII. Fliegerkorps of the Luftwaffe was stationed in Taganrog. From November 1942, Ju 52 and Ju 88 aircraft were flying supplies to German troops encircled in Stalingrad. The promised tonnage figure was never reached, instead of the minimum required 300 tons of supplies per day, a maximum of 100 tons per day was reached.

=== SS and other German intelligence services in Taganrog ===
Taganrog was an important city and was paid considerable attention by German intelligence services. It was due not only to strategic objects, such as seaport, aerodrome, train stations or developed industry, but also to the fact that the city was located on the Azov Sea with hospitals and a spa center that could provide comfortable staying conditions for personnel.

The following special services were stationed in Taganrog in 1941–1943:

- SS Einsatzkommande SS-Sonderkommando 10a (November 1941 – July 1942)
- Sicherheitsdienst SD-6 (summer 1942 – July 1943)
- Sicherheitsdienst SD-10
- Sicherheitsdienst SD-4b (July 1943 – August 1943) headed by Eckhardt
- Geheime Feldpolizei GFP-626 (May 1942 – August 1943)
- Geheime Feldpolizei GFP-721 (October 1942 – August 1943) headed by Brandt
- Abwehr (military intelligence) Abwehrgruppe 101 and 103
- Abwehr Abwehrgruppe 201
- Abwehr "Nachrichtenbeobachter" group (January–February 1942)
- Abwehr "Marine Einsatzkommando des Schwartzes Meeres" May–July 1942)
- Abwehr Abwehrnebenstelle "Ukraine" (Rittersporen) (December 1941– ... )
- Abwehr Abwehrausland Wally (since 1942 stationed on Italianski Pereulok 36, at the former Peoples' Court building, unknown if it was Wally-1 or Wally-2)

== Nazi crimes ==
=== Genocide at Gully of Petrushino ===
The SS Einsatzgruppe Sonderkommando 10a performed systematic genocide of Taganrog citizens from the first days of occupation. The large groups of citizens (old men, women, communists, young communists, gypsies, Jews, and anyone suspected in aiding the resistance movement) were taken from Vladimirskaya Plaza in Taganrog to Petrushino village (near Beriev), where they were shot to death in the Gully of Petrushino (Todesschlucht).

The massacres in Taganrog started with the Final Solution of the Jewish question. On October 22, 1941 the Ortskommendant issued an order for all Jewish people to wear a Star of David sign and to register themselves at the Ortskommendatur. It was followed by an Appeal to the Jewish Population of Taganrog signed by the Ortskommendant Alberti. The "appeal" was calling all Jews to gather themselves on October 29, 1941 at 8:00 am on Vladimirskaya Plaza in Taganrog from where they were supposed to be taken to a ghetto. Ortskommendant Alberti explained this measure as necessary due to an alleged rise of antisemitism among the local population, and that the German police and Gestapo would better manage the question if the Jewish population were separated into a certain district of the city:

In order to implement this measure, the Jews of both sexes and of all ages, including the persons born of marriages between Jews and not-Jews must be present on Wednesday, October 29, 1941 at 8 o'clock in the morning at Vladimirskaya Ploshad of Taganrog. All Jews must carry documents and hand in the keys to currently occupied houses and flats. A pasteboard tag with full names and full address must be attached to the keys by a wire or a lace. We highly recommend the Jews to take with them all valuables and cash...(excerpt)

On October 29, 1941 all Jews of Taganrog (around 2,500 people) were gathered on Vladimirskaya Plaza, promptly registered at the building of the school no.27 in front of Vladimirskaya Plaza and taken by trucks to the Gully of Petrushino near the Beriev Aircraft Factory, where they were shot to death by Schutzmannschaft collaborators under control of Otto Ohlendorf's Einsatzgruppe D. Of all the Jewish children who lived in Taganrog in 1941 only a 14-year-old boy Volodya Kobrin (Russian: Кобрин, Владимир Моисеевич) managed to escape certain death thanks to the help of various people in Taganrog, and especially Anna Mikhailovna Pokrovskaya, who was awarded the title of Righteous among the Nations by Professor Alisa Shenar, Ambassador of Israel in Russia on July 19, 1996.

On August 21, 1943, one week prior to Taganrog's liberation by the Red Army, 80 citizens (workers, women and young people) were shot to death on the seashore of Gulf of Taganrog, on Spit of Petrushino.

According to the information of the State Archive, some 7,000 Taganrogers (1,500 of them children of various age) were shot to death in the Gully of Petrushino.

=== Use of children as forced blood donors ===
In June 1943, all the children of the Taganrog children's home were evacuated by the Nazis to Verkhnyaya Lepetiha village of Kherson Oblast to be used as involuntary blood donors for wounded officers and soldiers. They were delivered by groups to a German naval hospital ship on the Dniepr, where their blood was taken and the dead bodies were afterwards thrown into the river. Twenty-two children were found by mere chance by the military intelligence Guards Sergeant Vladimir Tsibulkin (formerly worker of the Taganrog Combine-Harvester factory) and were saved from poisoning planned by SS by an attack of the 301st Rifle Division (Soviet Union) on February 8, 1944.

The front-line cameraman and Stalin Prize winner Vladimir Sushinskiy filmed a documentary on the salvation of these children.

=== The OST-Arbeiters ===
From the first days, the occupation regime started deportation of the citizens to Nazi Germany for forced hard labour. Nazi Germany needed workforce, and the population census held by Germans in occupied Taganrog in February 1942 revealed possibilities for displacing citizens into Germany or the occupied territories.

The Bürgermeisteramt organized a labour exchange in the building of the municipal school no.8. The first mass deportations through this organization took place in April 1942. The people were convoyed on foot by the police and military to Primorskoe village near Mariupol, and further taken by train to Stalino, where the central "distribution center" for OST-Arbeiters in the South was located.

A file with photographs and fingerprints for each Taganroger sent for work in Germany was produced. The file documented the possibilities for his/her use depending on age, profession and health condition.

The second wave of mass deportations was in June–August 1943. Only within 40 days (from June 11 to July 20, 1943) 10 "shipments" of people to Stalino were made by trucks totaling 6762 people, 4043 of them being small children.

From October 22 to August 29, 1943 some 27,000 Zwangsarbeiters or OST-Arbeiters were forced to leave Taganrog and were displaced into Germany or other occupied territories, including concentration camps.

== Wartime photos ==
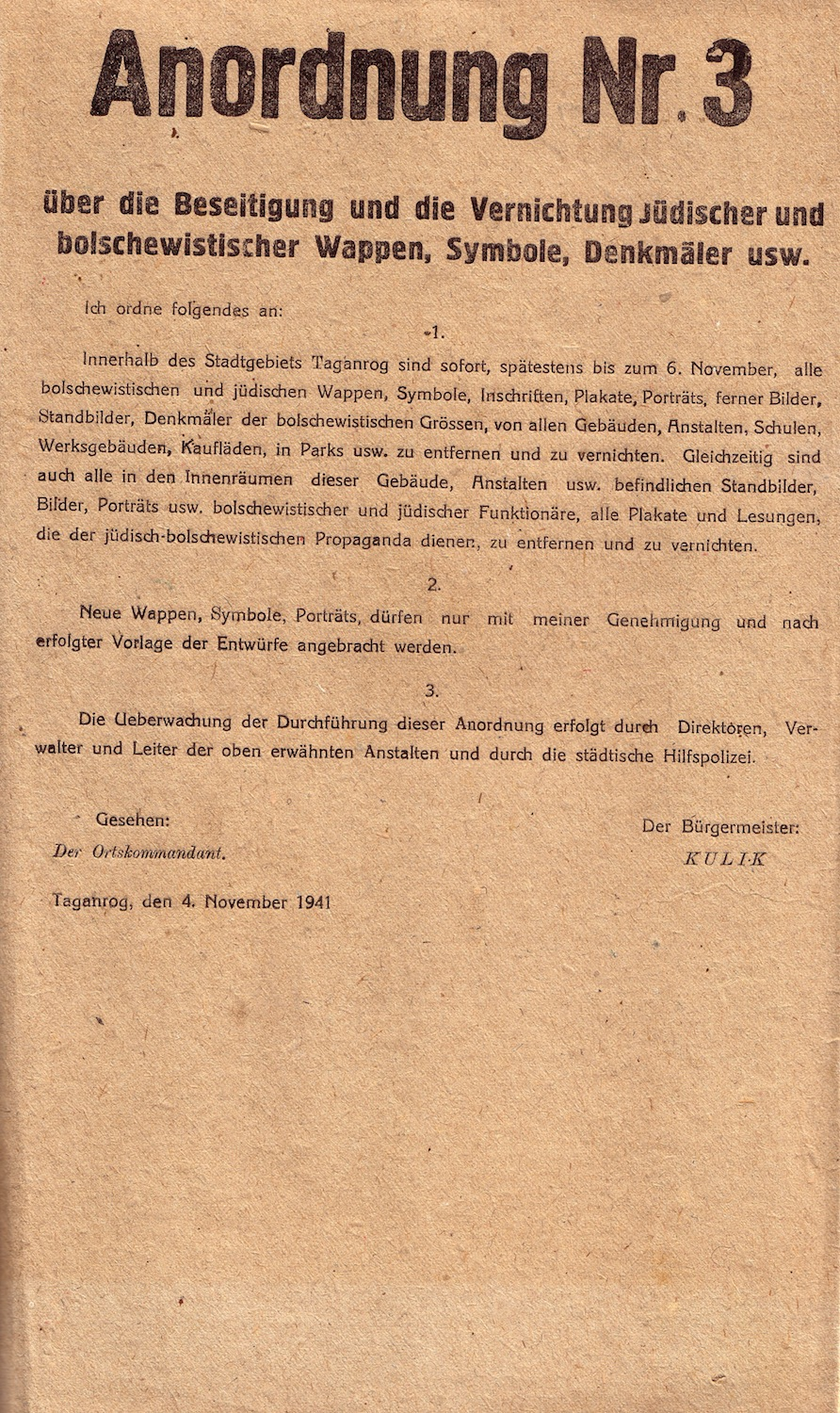
Anordnung (Order) of the German occupation authorities on the elimination and destruction of Jewish or Soviet coat of arms, symbols, monuments etc., November 4, 1941

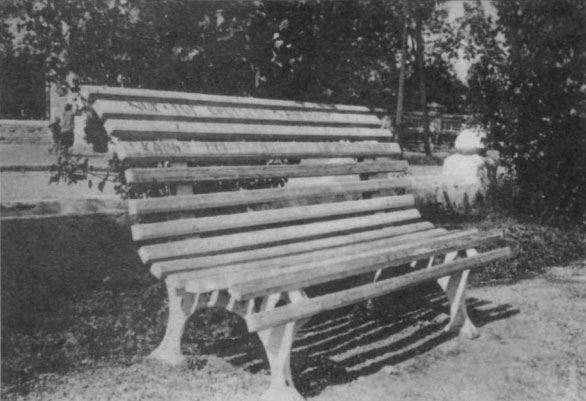
The bench at the Gorky Park (Taganrog), summer of 1942. The inscription reads: "Nur fuer Deutsche" (Only for Germans).

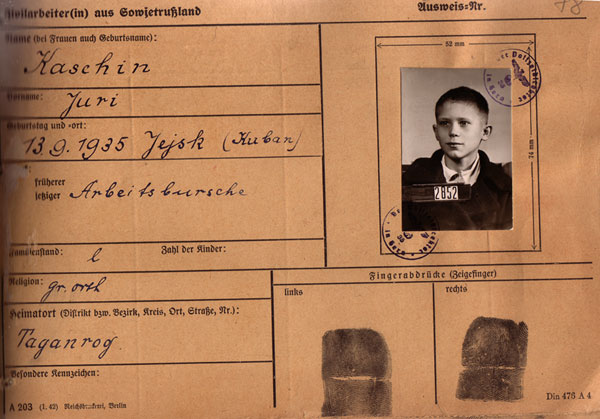
Documentation on the deportation of a boy from Taganrog for forced labor in Nazi Germany, 1942

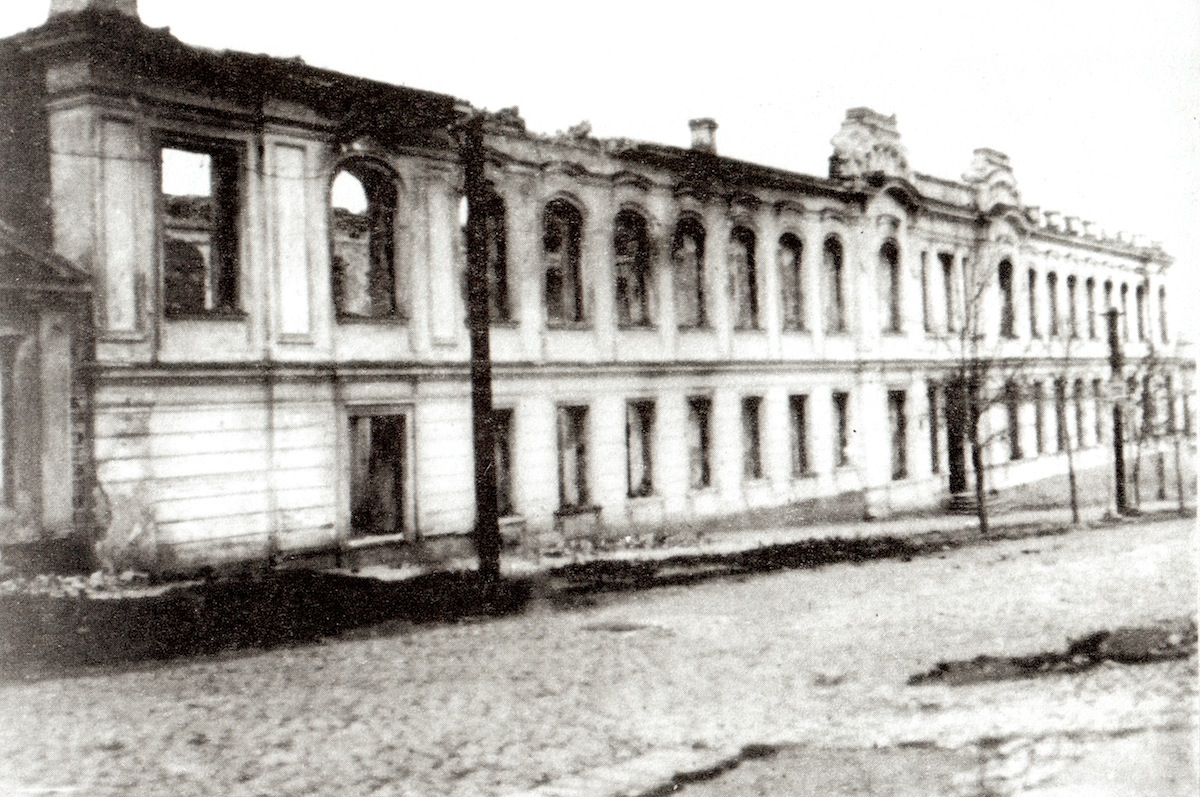
Ruins of the school no.4 in Taganrog. 1943.

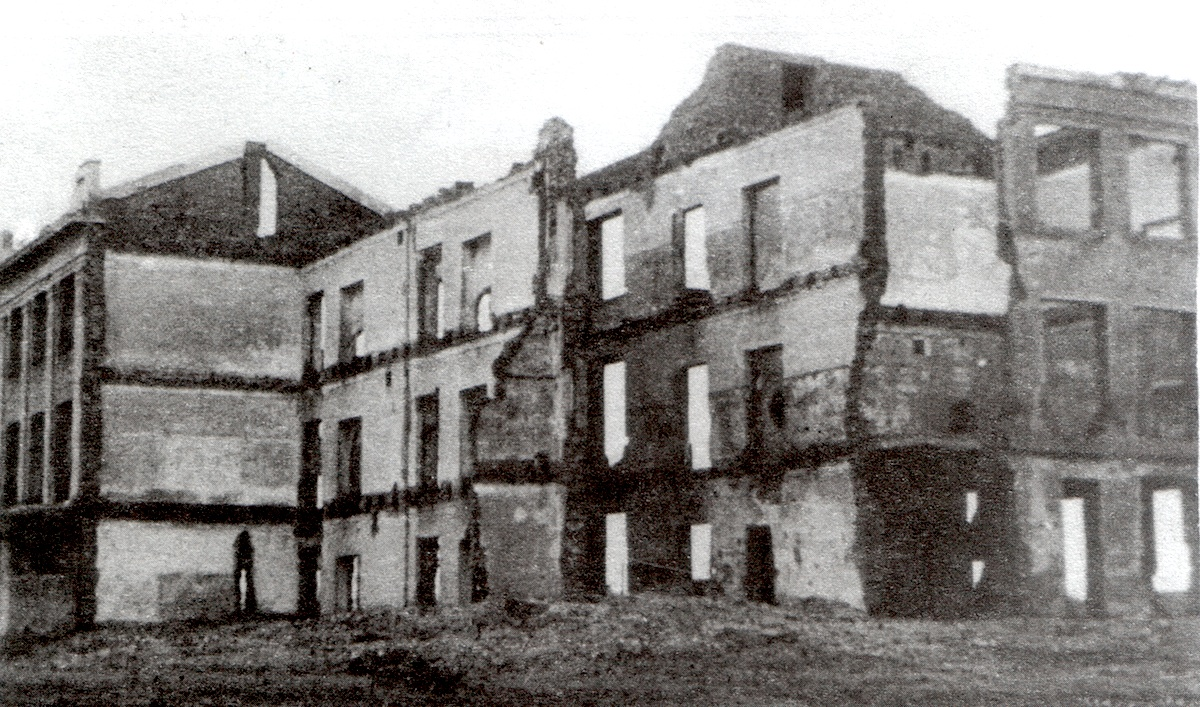
Ruins of the school no.27 in Taganrog. 1943. This is the building where the Jews of Taganrog were registered prior to be taken to the Gully of Petrushino.

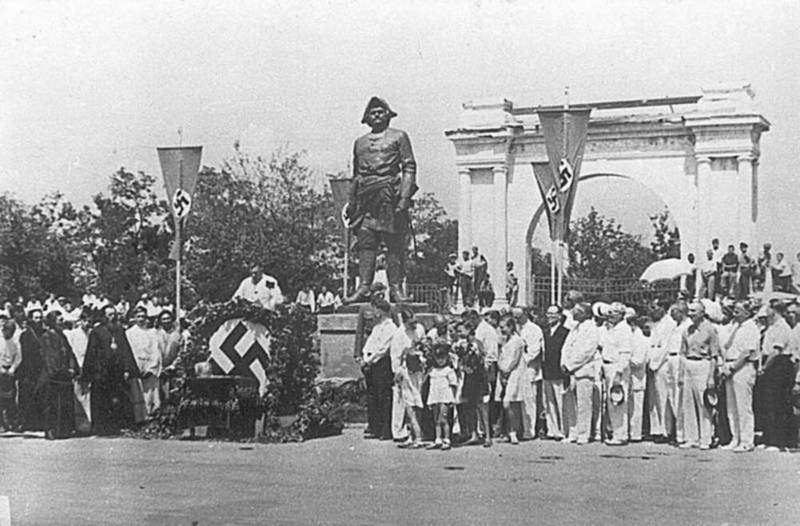
Peter I Monument in Taganrog re-inaugurated by the occupation authorities.

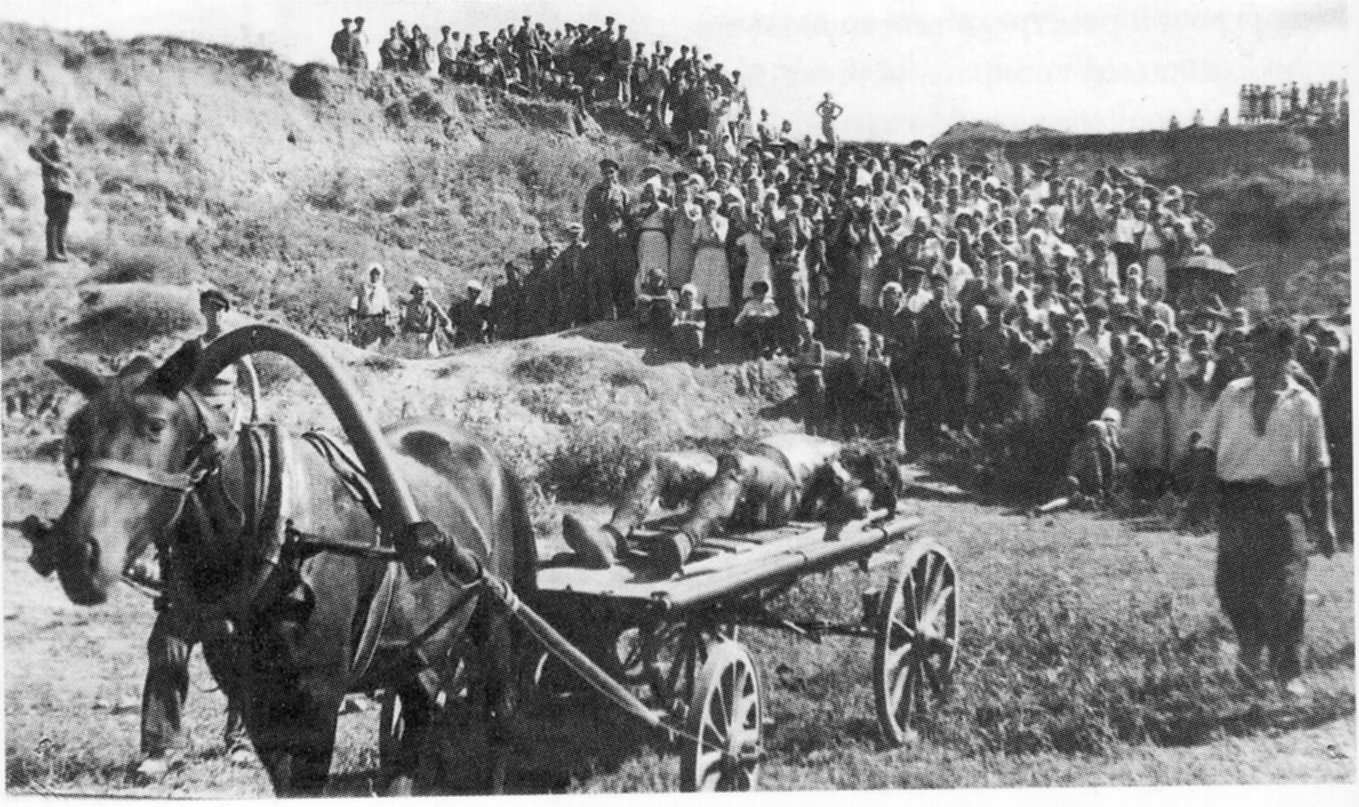
Fascist atrocities discovered at Gully of Petrushino, September 1, 1943

== Resistance during Taganrog's occupation ==
At least two Soviet partisans groups, organized by the NKVD, acted in Taganrog before the Soviet troops left the city and in November 1941, Semion Morozov organized an underground resistance group, which consisted mainly of young Komsomol members. The members of the two groups acted separately and were not permitted to go into contact.

As of early December 1941 only 11 young people were members of the Taganrog resistance movement, while in early 1943 more than 500 people who were divided into 27 partisan groups acted against occupation forces in Taganrog.

On February 18, 1943 Semion Morozov was arrested. The core of the underground movement's activists were arrested in May 1943, quickly prosecuted and shot to death at Gully of Petrushino. After several arrests in February–May 1943 some 200 members of the Taganrog resistance movement were arrested, tortured and killed (including 27 women and 2 children).

126 members of the Taganrog resistance movement were awarded with orders and medals, the Commissar of the Taganrog's underground Semion Morozov was posthumously made Hero of the Soviet Union.

=== Major resistance operations ===
- November 15, 1941: arson and explosion at the Taganrog seaport's ammunition depot (completely destroyed)
- early December 1941: explosion at the Taganrog City Hall, its canteen and the car repair shop (147 Nazi German officers and soldiers killed).
- December 1941: arson at the "Krasny Gidropress" factory (40 trucks burnt).
- January 25, 1942: arson of wood materials (used for repair of German aircraft) at the territory of the Beriev Aircraft Company.
- April–May 1942: two diversion acts at the "Krasny Gidropress" factory (13 and 120 trucks temporarily out of service).
- June 1942: derailment of a train (10 wagons) at Martsevo/Koshkino.
- October 1942: derailment of a train transporting panzers, cars and ammunition between Varenovka and Primorka stations.
- December 1942: attack on the police station near Mayakovka village. Trophies: 4 light machine-guns, 10 rifles, grenades.
- January 1943: holes-traps made (from Ochakovsk tail up to Taganrog) on the ice of the Gulf of Taganrog, which resulted in a gross loss of horses (more than 100).
- February 1943: 4 attacks on retreating German and Romanian troops through the Gulf of Taganrog. Trophies: 7 machine-guns, 40 rifles, 13 submachine guns, 11 heavily-loaded trucks were sunken in the Azov Sea, 37 Nazi German soldiers killed.
- March 1943: arson of a truck loaded with products and cereals (truck completely destroyed).
- May 14, 1943: successful assassination attempt by Sergey Weiss and Yuri Pazon at Sicherheitsdienst's informants Musikova and Raevskaya.
- (throughout the duration of the occupation period) Distribution of leaflets and Sovinformburo's information bulletins.

== Collaboration during Taganrog's occupation ==
Soon after the occupation of Taganrog in 1941, the existing Soviet Militsiya was transformed into a military collaborationist auxiliary police under the name of "Russian auxiliary police" (Russian: Русская вспомогательная полиция), also referred to as Russian Schutzmannschaft or "Hilfspolizei". Its main difference from the Soviet service was that besides the criminal department, it had a "political" department, which was aimed at suppression and extermination of Nazi Germany's enemies: Soviet partisans, underground groups, Soviet activists, Jews, communists, Komsomol members, NKVD agents, etc.

The political department of the police was controlled directly by Sicherheitsdienst SD-10 and later by SD-6, and closely cooperated with the Geheime Feldpolizei (the secret military police of the Wehrmacht). By March 1943, the Schutzmannschaft's personnel in Taganrog nearly doubled in comparison with that of the Soviet militsiya, and reached around 600 policemen.

The "Russian auxiliary police" was directly involved in all punitive operations and formed part of the killing squads, including the Gully of Petrushino, and in arrests of young activists of the Taganrog underground resistance movement.

The first chief of Russian auxiliary police was Yuriy Kirsanov, who was replaced by Boris Vasilievich Stoyanov of Bulgarian origin on May 20, 1942. The criminal department of the police was located at Ulitsa Grecheskaya 9; the political dept. was located on Frunze Street, 16. In 1942 both institutions were relocated into the former "Palace of Pioneers" on Petrovskaya Str.

== Liberation of Taganrog ==
After their defeat at the Battle of Stalingrad, the German military command started to strengthen its defense lines. The defense lines "Mius-Front" along the Mius River had been created under command of General Paul Ludwig Ewald von Kleist back in October 1941. By summer 1943 the Mius-Front consisted of three defense lines with a total depth of the Mius defense range of 40–50 kilometers. The defense was held by the 6th Army (Wehrmacht) under command of General Karl-Adolf Hollidt.

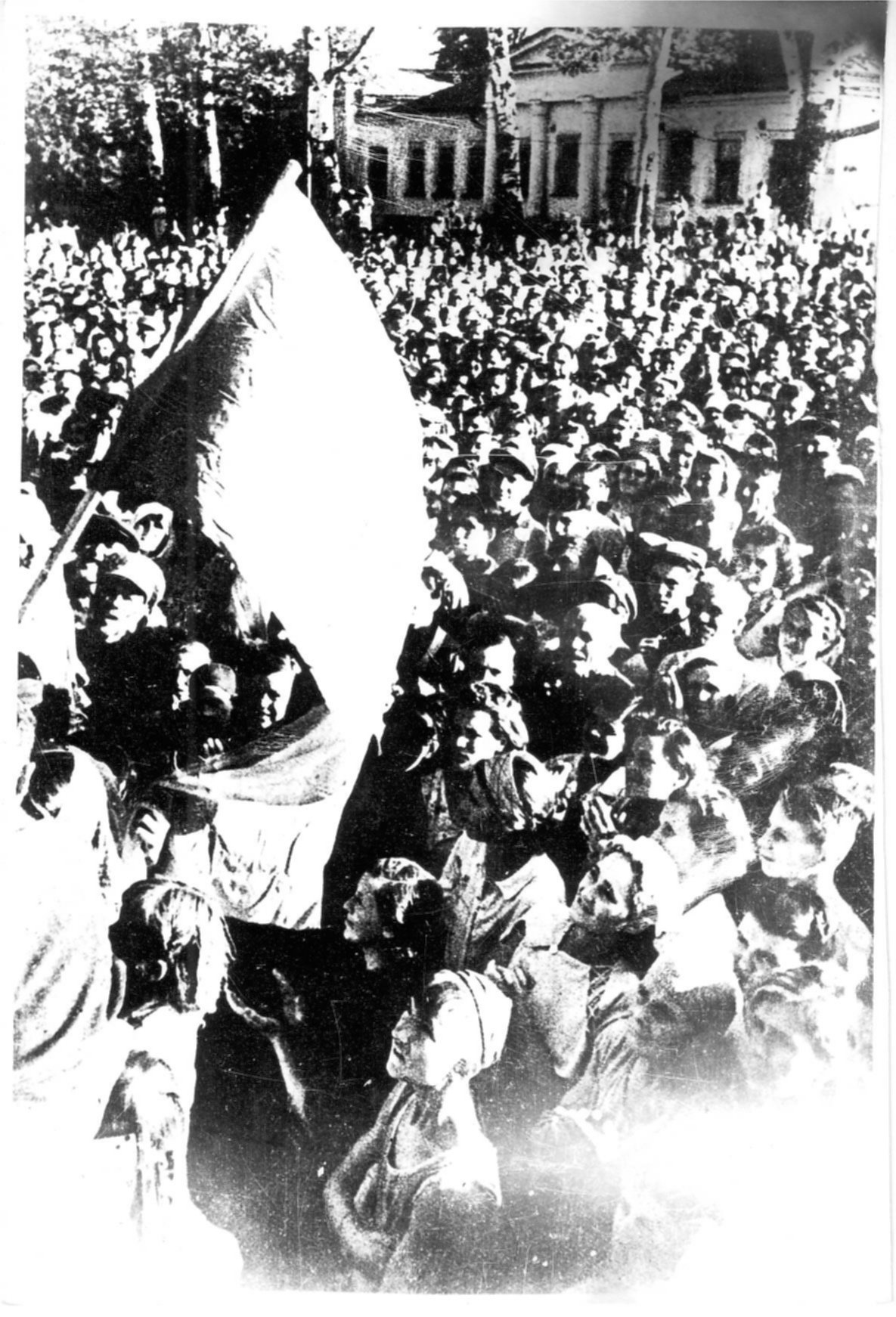
The meeting of the Taganrog citizens on the liberation day, August 31, 1943

On August 29, 1943 the 4th Guards Cavalry Corps of lieutenant-general Nikolai Kirichenko (Russian: Кириченко, Николай Яковлевич) breached the German defense line near Veselo-Voznesenovka village and reached the Azov Sea, cutting the retreat ways from Taganrog to Mariupol. However, by this time the main forces had already been evacuated from Taganrog. Only mine-layer parties were left in the city, and the Sambek Heights were held by the 111th Infantry Division under command of General Hermann Recknagel.

Taganrog was liberated on August 30, 1943 by Soviet Army's 130th Rifle Division under command of Konstantin Sychev (ru:Сычёв, Константин Васильевич) and 416th Rifle Division under command of Dmitri Syzranov (Russian: Сызранов Дмитрий Михайлович).

On August 30, 1943 Generalissimo Marshal of the Soviet Union Joseph Stalin gave the order to General Fyodor Tolbukhin to name the 130th Rifle Division and 416th Rifle Division after the city of Taganrog, and on August 30 at 7:30 pm to fire a salute of twenty salvoes in honor of the glorious troops who liberated the Rostov Oblast and Taganrog.

On September 1, 1943 the mass grave of citizens murdered in the Gully of Petrushino Taganrog was publicly examined. The Secretary of the Taganrog City Communist Party committee Alexander Zobov held a speech before the gathered citizens. The medical commission permitted the exhumation of 31 dead bodies from the upper level.

== Post-liberation period ==
In difficult conditions, the factories gradually restored the production important for the victory over Nazi Germany. In October 1943 the Taganrog Pipe Factory and the Boiler Factory "Krasny Kotelshchik" resumed their work.

The citizens of Taganrog collected money for the construction of a tank column Taganrog, which was built from that money and given over to the army of General Pavel Rybalko. Some of these tanks with inscriptions Taganrog participated at the Battle of Berlin.

The school students of Taganrog collected money for a Petlyakov Pe-2 dive bomber (developed by Taganroger Vladimir Petlyakov). The aircraft was given the name The Taganrog's Pioneer (Russian: Таганрогский пионер) and was given over to the 135th Taganrog Guards Bomber Aviation Regiment (Russian: 135-й гвардейский бомбардировочный Таганрогский Краснознаменный орденов Кутузова и Александра Невского авиационный полк) on May 19, 1944, the birthday of the All-Union Pioneer Organization.

== Trivia ==
- The German occupation regime gave some of the streets their pre-Revolution names.
- The municipal Gorky Park was partially destroyed and was used by the occupation forces as cemetery (Der Deutsche Heldenfriedhof).
- On July 18, 1943, the Peter the Great Monument was re-inaugurated in front of the central entrance to the Gorky Park.
- In 1943, Soviet Russian cartoonists Kukryniksy dedicated their political cartoon "Taganrog is Soviet Again" (Russian: "Таганрог – советский") to the liberation of Taganrog. It was published in the TASS Windows, with the accompanying text composed by Samuil Marshak.
- During occupation, Germans built a few pillboxes on Historicheskiy Boulevard facing the Taganrog seaport. Remains of these fortifications are still preserved.

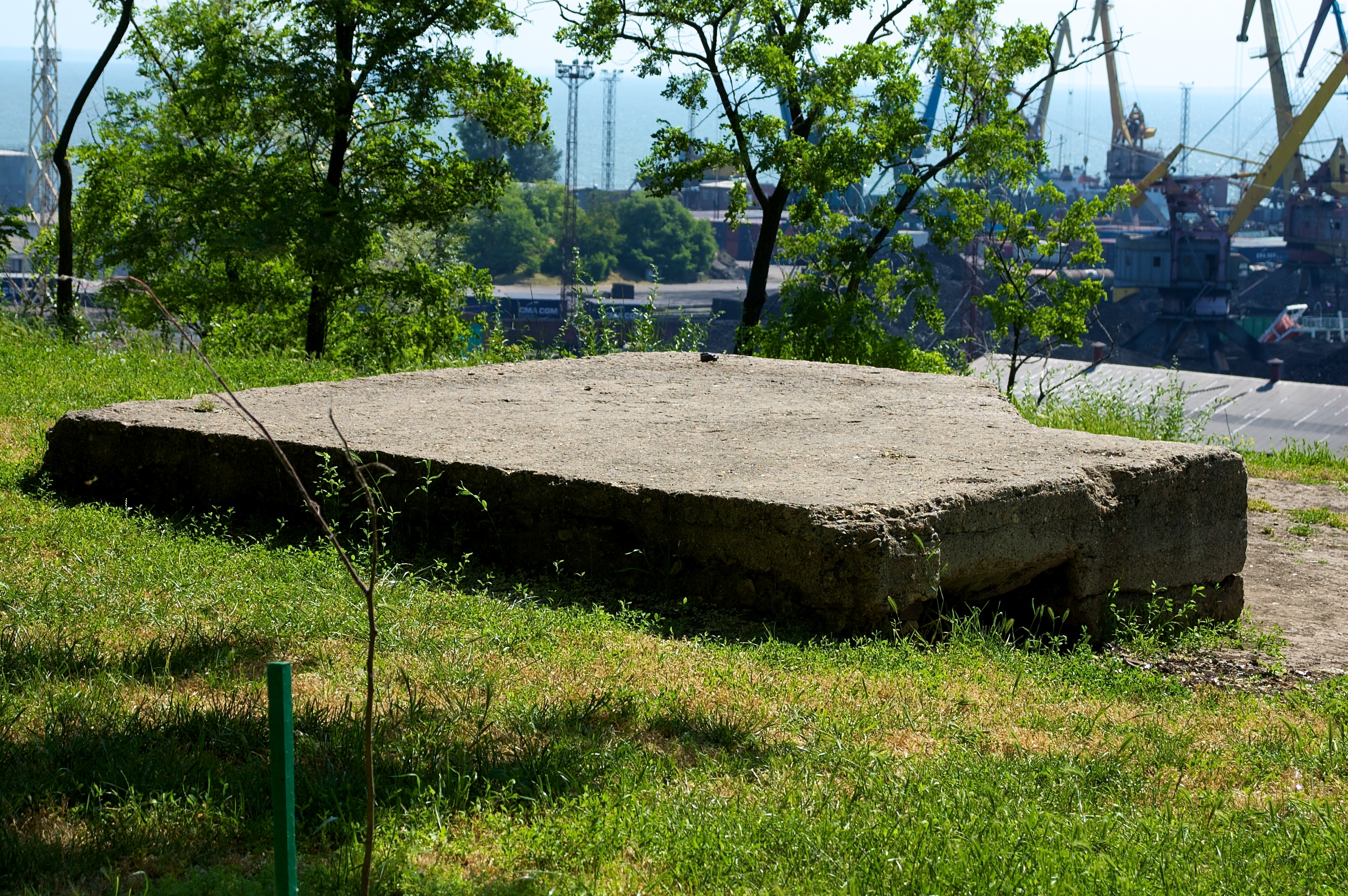
One of the German pillboxes that were built on Historicheski Boulevard in Taganrog, facing the seaport.

== Consequences ==
- The infrastructure of the city and its unique historical and cultural heritage suffered extensive damage.
- In February 1942 the German occupation government conducted an official census (145 thousand people). The population of the city diminished nearly twice and was less than 80 thousand people in August 1943.
- Over 10,000 Taganrogers who participated in the Great Patriotic War were awarded with various state awards.
- The whole collection of art from the Taganrog Museum of Art, and overall 339 objects of art were lost forever from the Taganrog museum collections.

== City of Military Glory ==
Taganrog was conferred the status of City of Military Glory by the President of the Russian Federation Dmitriy Anatolyevich Medvedev on November 3, 2011, for "courage, endurance and mass heroism, exhibited by defenders of the city in the struggle for the freedom and independence of the Motherland". On May 8, 2015 the stela of Military Glory was inaugurated in Taganrog.

== Commemorative monuments ==
Picture	Monument	Location
	"Oath of the Youth" Russian: "Клятва юности" commemorates heroes of the Taganrog resistance movement. Inaugurated on August 30, 1973 on Spartakovski pereulok, in front of the Chekhov Gymnasium.	
	The eternal flame at the central alley of Gorky Park	
	Plaque located on the place in Gorky Park, where the meeting of Taganrog citizens was held after the liberation of Taganrog on August 31, 1943.	
	Located in Gorky Park in honor of three Soviet fighter pilots who died on Taganrog liberation day in August 1943.	
	Commemorates Taganrog's Communist Party secretaries and city's executive committee's members who died during evacuation of Taganrog on October 17, 1941. Inaugurated in August 1944.	
	IS-3 tank commemorating Soviet tankmen who participated in the liberation of Taganrog. Inaugurated on August 30, 1988.	
	World War II Monument at Sambek Heights (former Mius-Front), at the entrance of Taganrog. Inaugurated in 1980.	
	Monument to Ivan Golubets	
	Stela of Military Glory	

== See also ==
- History of Taganrog
