= Gorky Park (Taganrog) =

Park in Taganrog, Russia

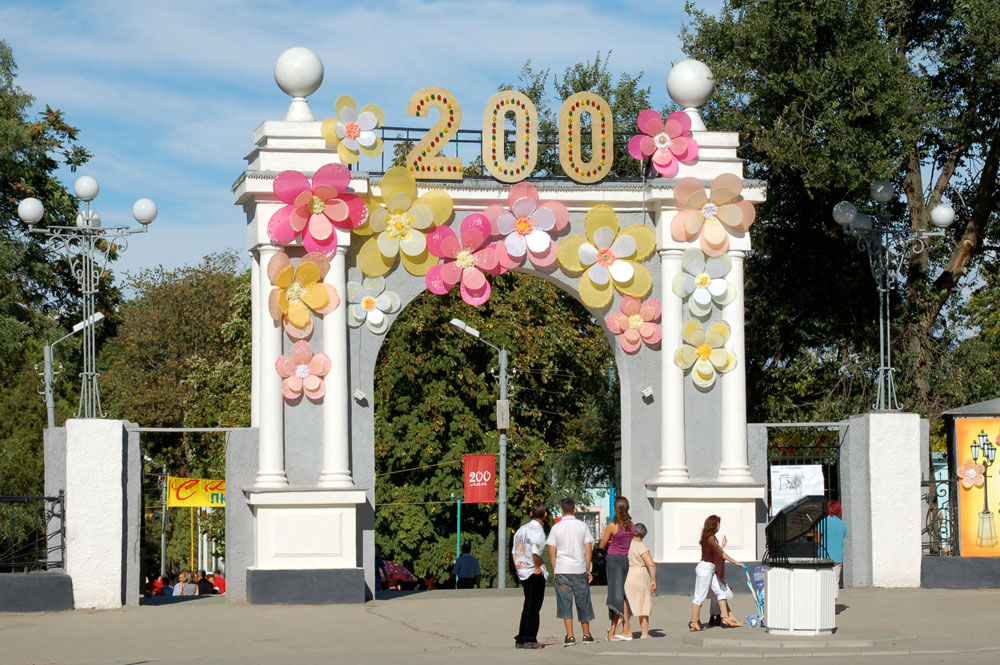
- The central entrance to the park in September 2006 during the park's bicentenary celebrations
- Interactive map of Gorky Park
- Type: public park
- Location: downtown Taganrog
- Coordinates: 47°13′12″N 38°55′32″E
- Created: June 30, 1806
- Operator: Taganrog Local Government
- Open: All year, children recreation facilities close for the winter period

The Gorky Park (Russian: Парк культуры и отдыха им. Горького) is a municipal park of culture and recreation in the city of Taganrog, Russia.

== History ==
On June 30, 1806, the first trees were planted for the Taganrog's "Chemist’s garden" and "botanical garden" by the order of Taganrog's governor baron Balthasar von Campenhausen In 1895 the project of the new garden's planning according to new European standards was approved. In 1903, Monument to Peter the Great was placed on Petrovskaya Street in front of the main entrance to the park.

In 1924, the Peter the Great monument was dismantled and removed. In 1932, the municipal garden became the Park of Culture and Recreation and in 1934 it was named Gorky Park after Maxim Gorky. In 1941–1943, during the Occupation of Taganrog, the City Park was partially destroyed and was used by the occupation forces of Nazi Germany as a cemetery (Der Deutsche Heldenfriedhof). In 2006, the Gorky Park celebrated its bicentenary anniversary.

== Old and modern views of the Gorky Park ==
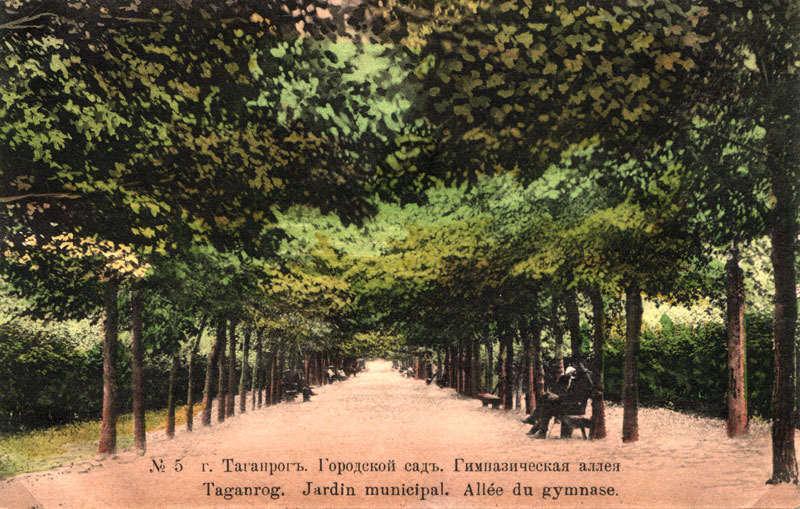
The Gymnasium Alley (leading from Chekhov Gymnasium) of the Taganrog City Park. View from a 19th-century postcard.

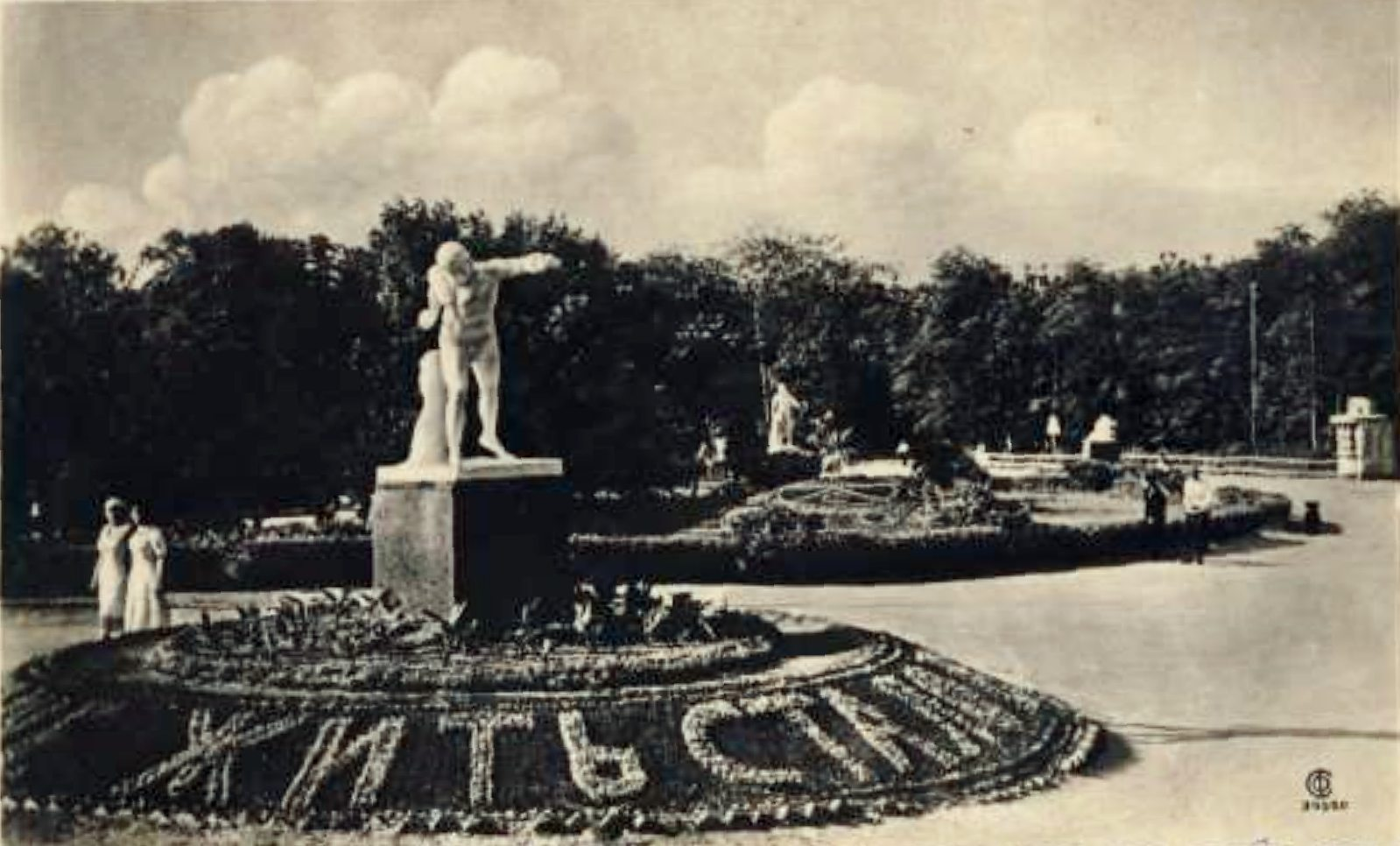
Gorky Park on a 1936 photograph

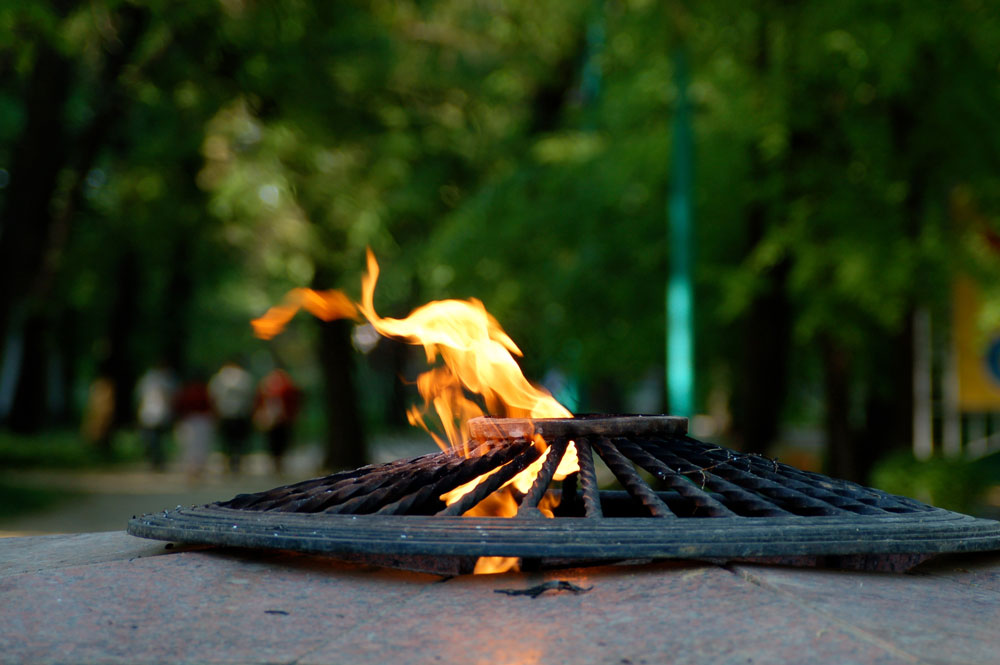
The eternal flame at the central alley of the Gorky Park, photo taken in 2007.

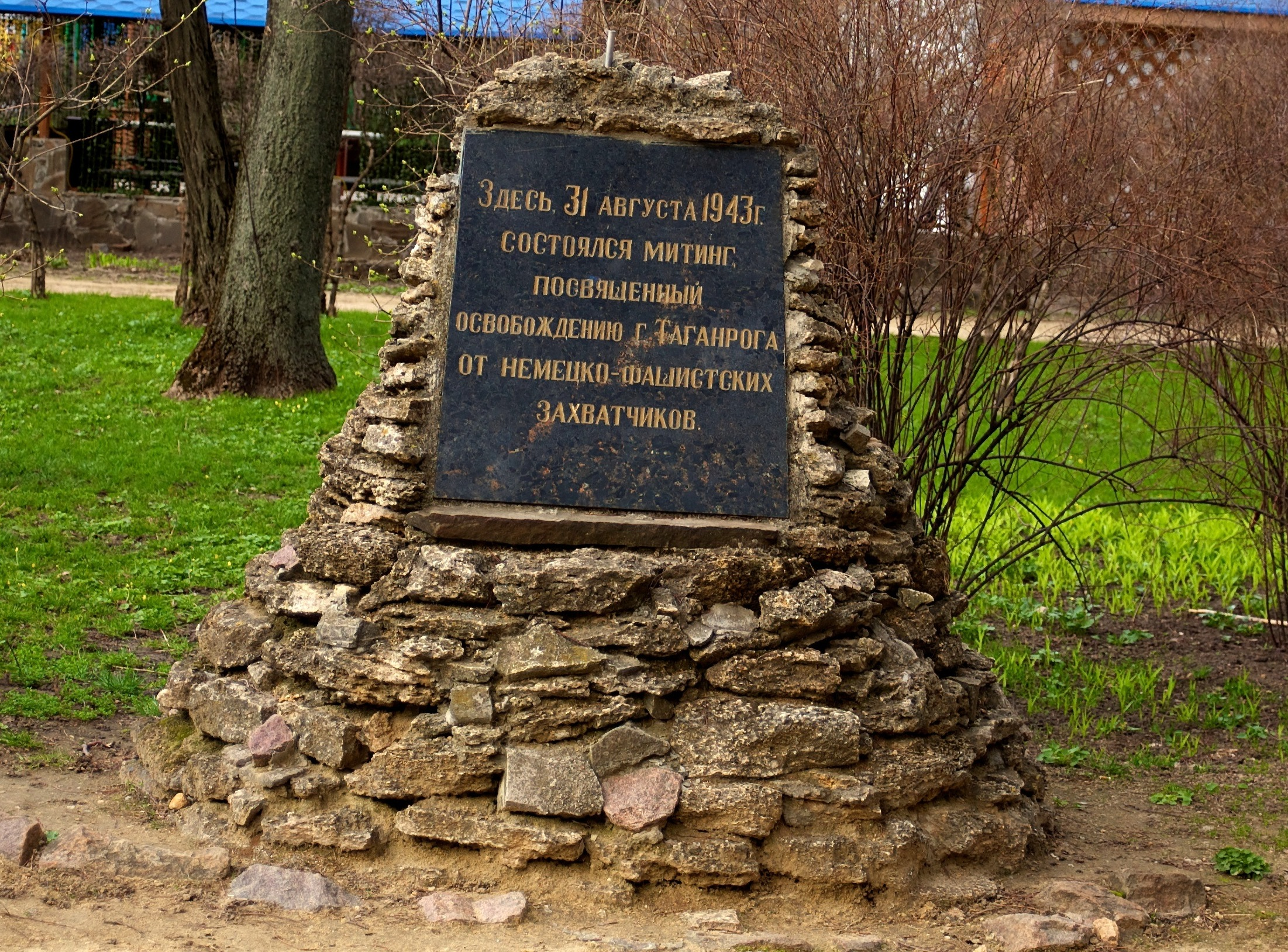
The plaque on the place in the Gorky Park, where was held the meeting of Taganrog citizens after the liberation of Taganrog on Aug.31, 1943.

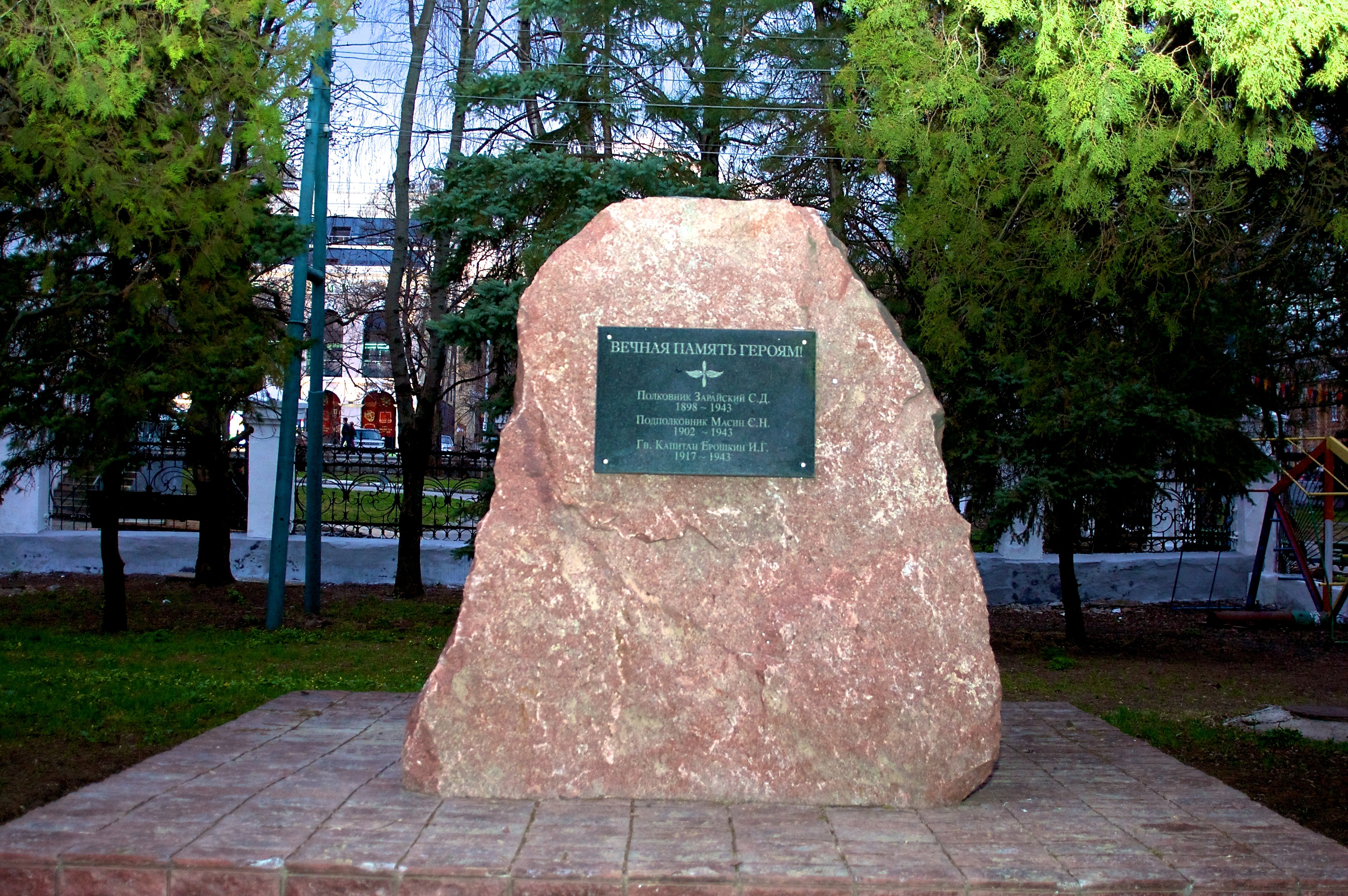
The monument in the Gorky Park in honor of 3 Soviet fighter pilots who died on the Taganrog liberation day in August 1943.

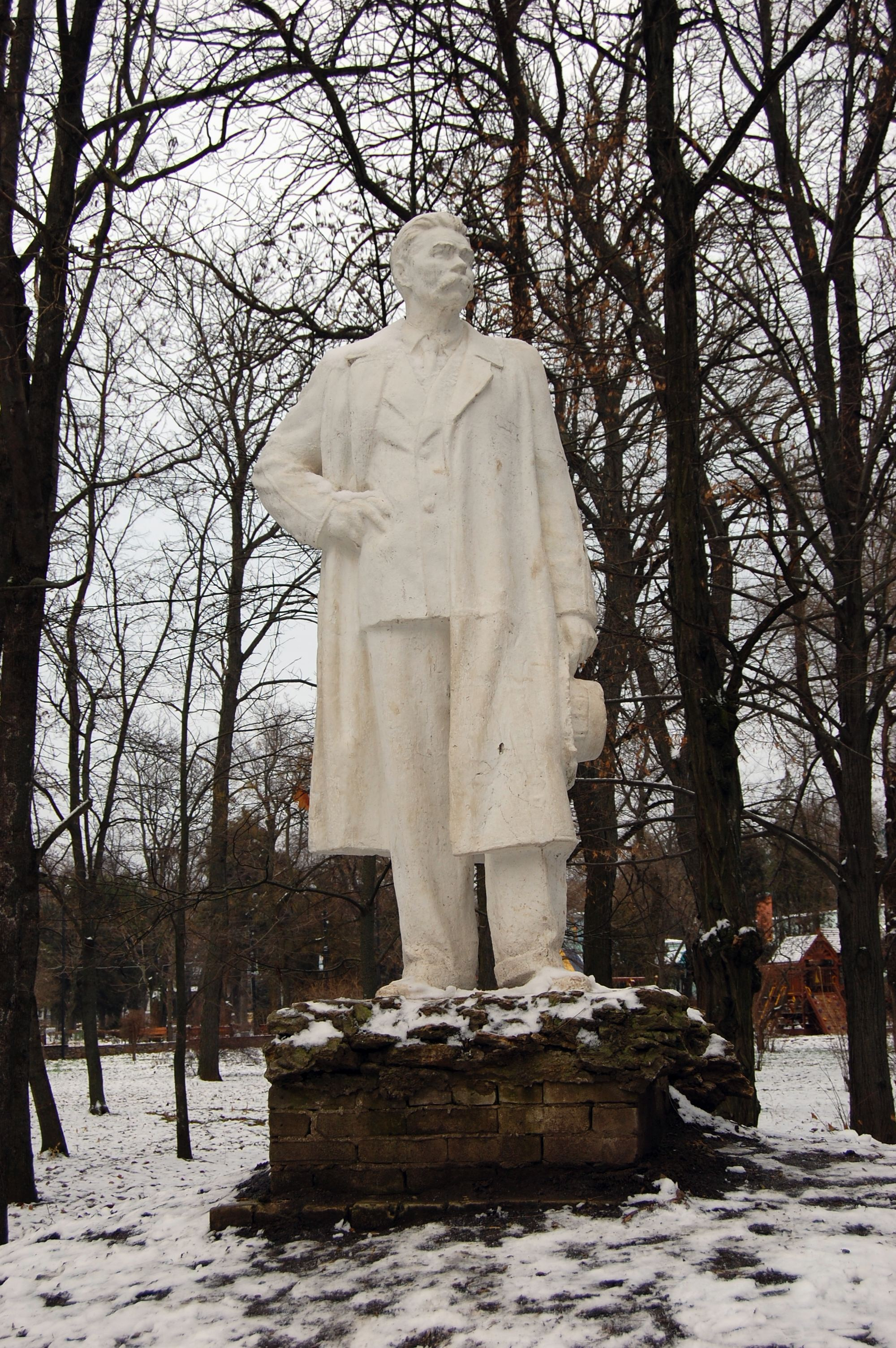
Monument to Soviet Russian writer Maxim Gorky.

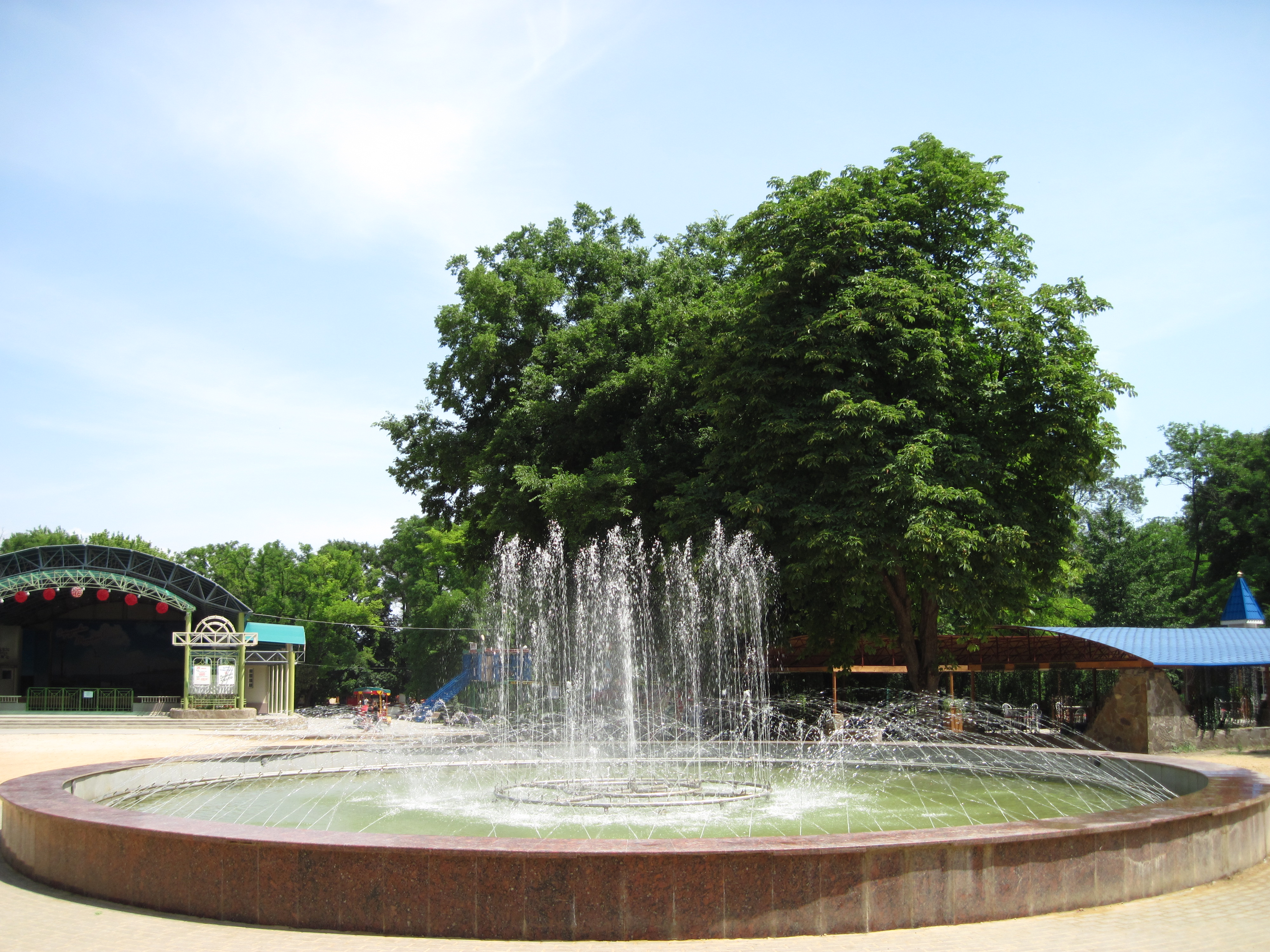
The fountain in the Gorky Park

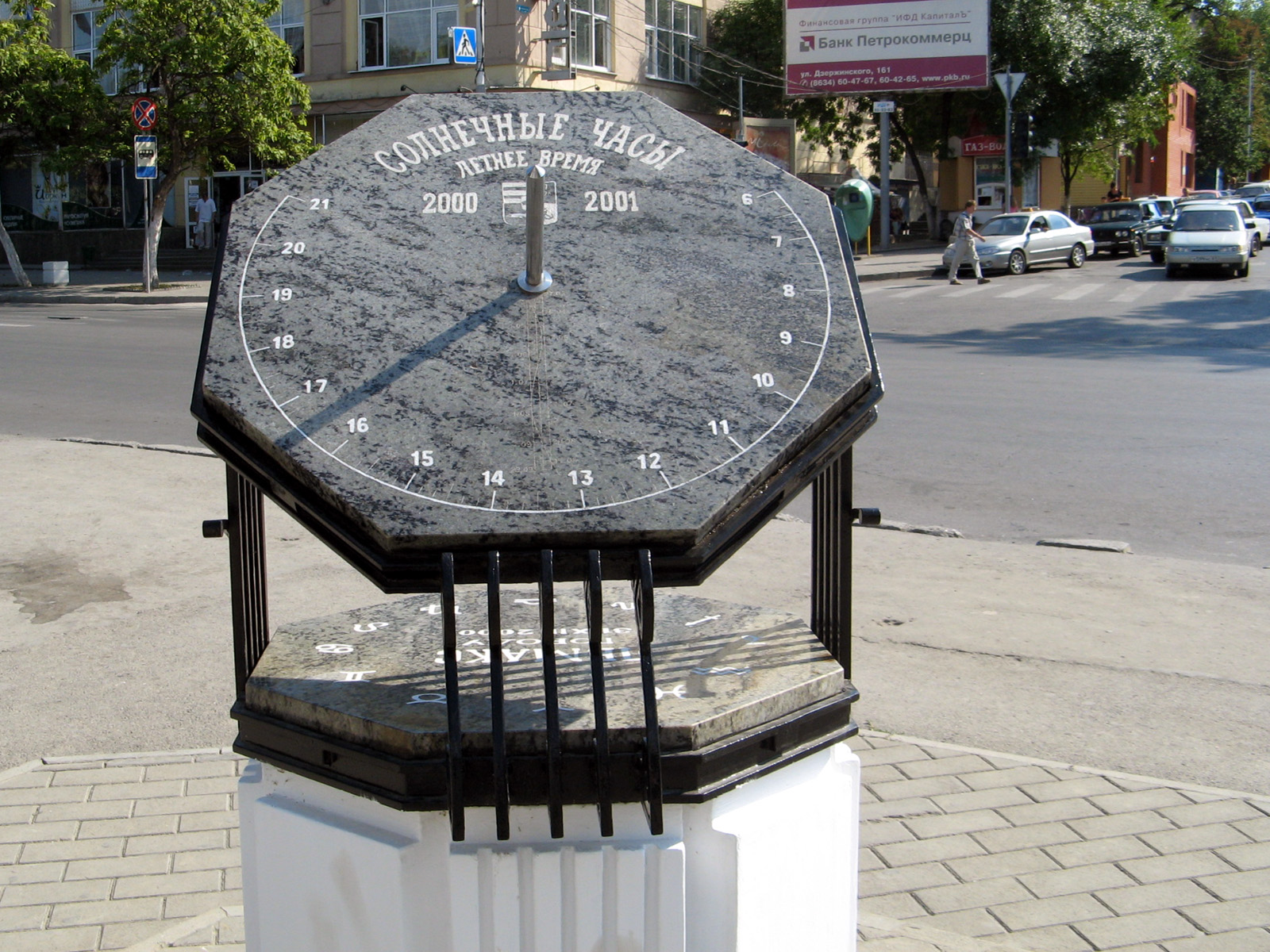
New sundial (2001) in front of the central gates

== External links and references ==
- Taganrog Encyclopedia (Энциклопедия Таганрога), 2nd edition, Taganrog, 2003
- История города Таганрога, П.П.Филевский, Москва, 1898
