= Peter I Monument in Taganrog =

Monument in Taganrog, Rostov, Russia

Coordinates: 47°12′18″N 38°56′47″E

Peter the Great Monument
- Памятник Петру I Памятник Петру Великому
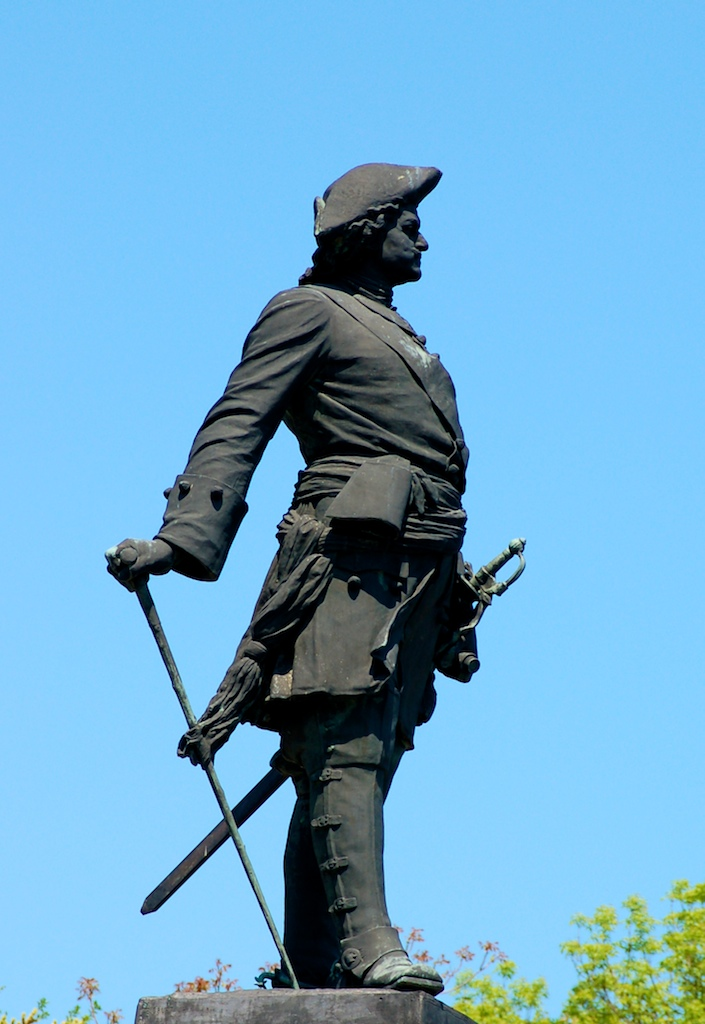
- Close-up (2006)
- Interactive map of Peter the Great Monument
- Location: Komsomolsky Boulevard, Taganrog, Rostov Oblast, Russia
- Designer: Mark Antokolsky
- Type: Statue
- Material: Bronze
- Completion date: 1901
- Opening date: 1903
- Dedicated to: Peter I of Russia

The Peter I Monument (Russian: Памятник Петру I), also known as the Peter the Great Monument (Памятник Петру Великому), is a monument to Peter I of Russia located in Taganrog, Russia. It is a bronze statue created by the sculptor Mark Antokolsky and first installed in 1903.

== History of the monument ==
The idea to open a memorial to Peter I of Russia, who founded Taganrog in 1698, came to Achilles Alferaki, the mayor of Taganrog from 1880 to 1887. The Emperor Alexander III of Russia gave his permission for the memorial on June 5, 1893.

In 1897, Taganrog City Council issued a resolution to request the sculptor Mark Antokolsky to produce a memorial to Peter I. In April 1898, Anton Chekhov met with Antokolsky] in Paris to arrange the production of a bronze statue. The statue was moulded in the atelier of Thibaut Brothers in Paris. The pedestal for the monument was made in 1901 by the artist Eduards, owner of an atelier in Odessa. The monument was delivered from Marseille to Taganrog on July 27, 1901, by the steamboat Despino. Petrovskaya Street near the central gates to the Municipal Park was selected as the site for the monument. The memorial to Peter I The Great was solemnly inaugurated on May 13, 1903, on Petrovskaya Street at the crossing with Campehnausen Street. The inscription on the pedestal reads: To the Emperor Peter I, Taganrog 1698-1898.

On January 25, 1924, the monument was dismantled by the Soviets and placed in the Chekhov Museum, which was at that time located at Chekhov Library. By 1933, the monument was enclosed into a wooden box in the court of Chekhov Museum.

In 1940, the Rostov Oblast government decided to re-inaugurate the monument, though not at its historical location on Petrovskaya Street, but on Komsomolsky Boulevard near the Taganrog seaport. The preparations began, but the German invasion of the Soviet Union prevented these plans from realization.

On July 18, 1943, during Occupation of Taganrog, it was re-inaugurated by Nazi Germany authorities in front of the central entrance to Gorky Park.

In September 1948, during the celebrations of the 250th anniversary of Taganrog's foundation, the monument was placed at its current located on Komsomolsky Boulevard.

== Old and modern views of the Peter the Great Monument in Taganrog ==
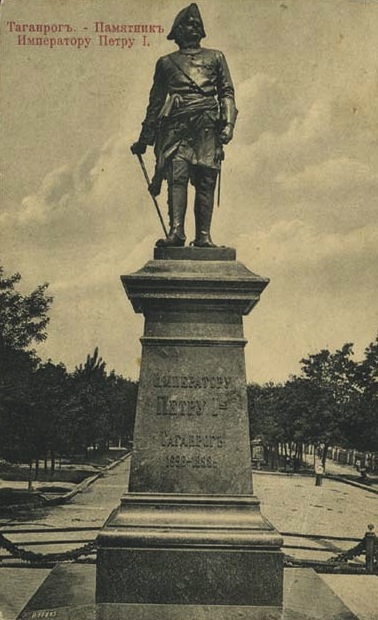
The monument on an old postcard (1907).

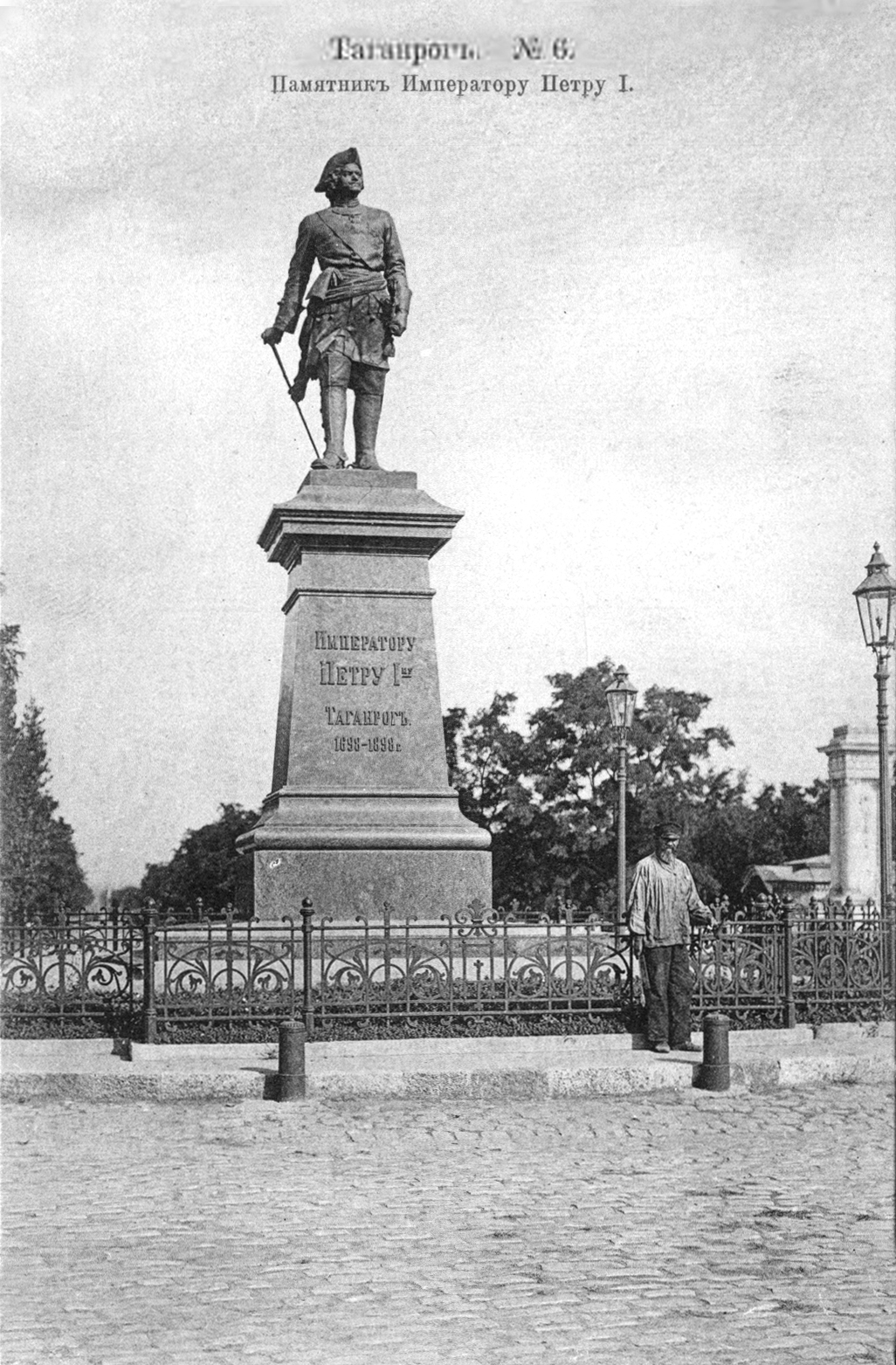
The Peter the Great Monument in the city of Taganrog (sculptor Mark Antokolski) as appears on a 19th-century postcard.

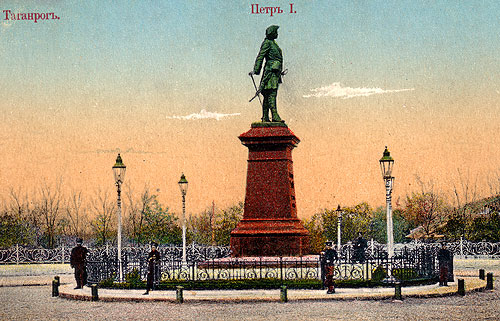
The Peter the Great Monument in the city of Taganrog (sculptor Mark Antokolski) as appears on a 19th-century postcard.

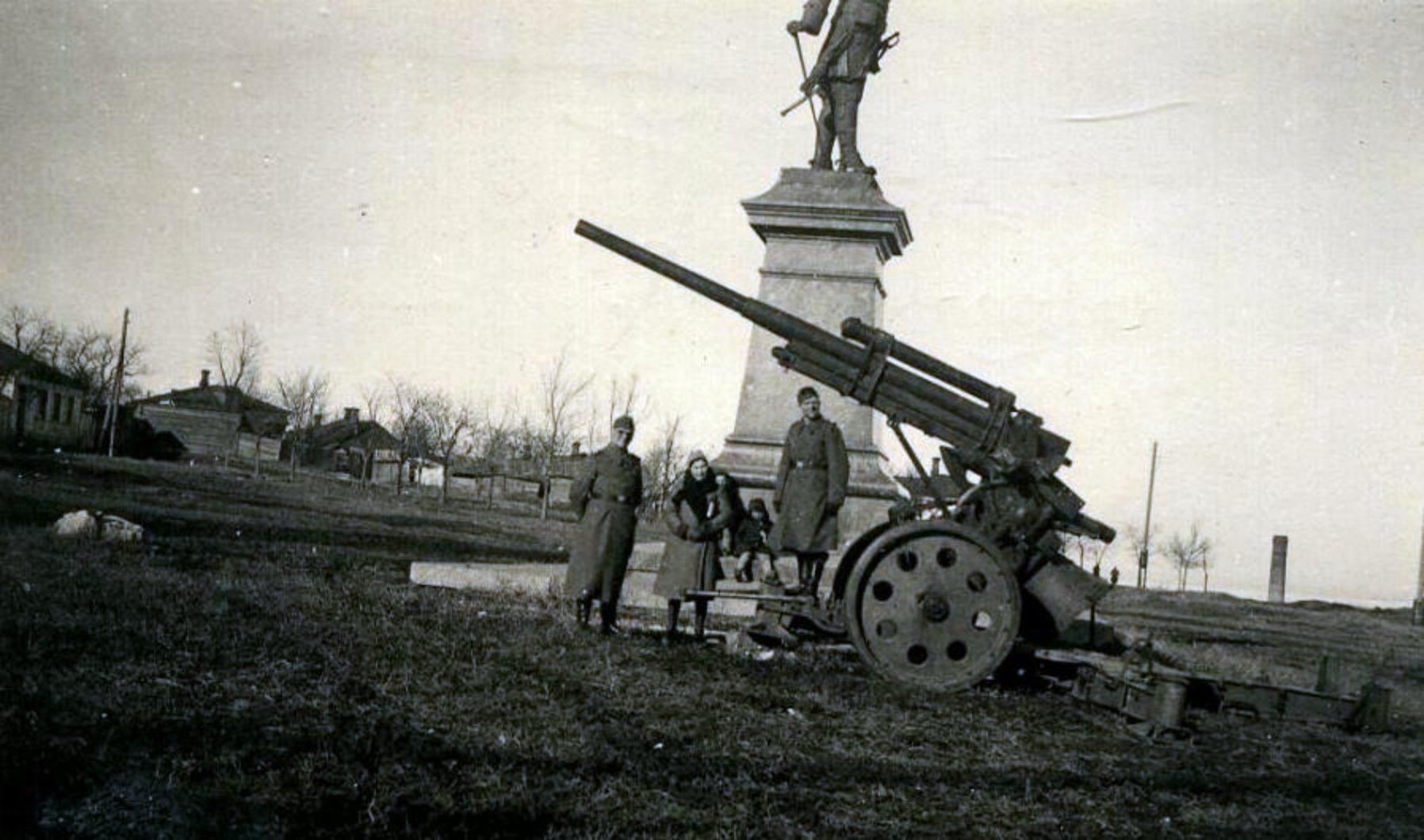
The monument sometime in 1942 on Historicheski Boulevard during occupation of Taganrog.

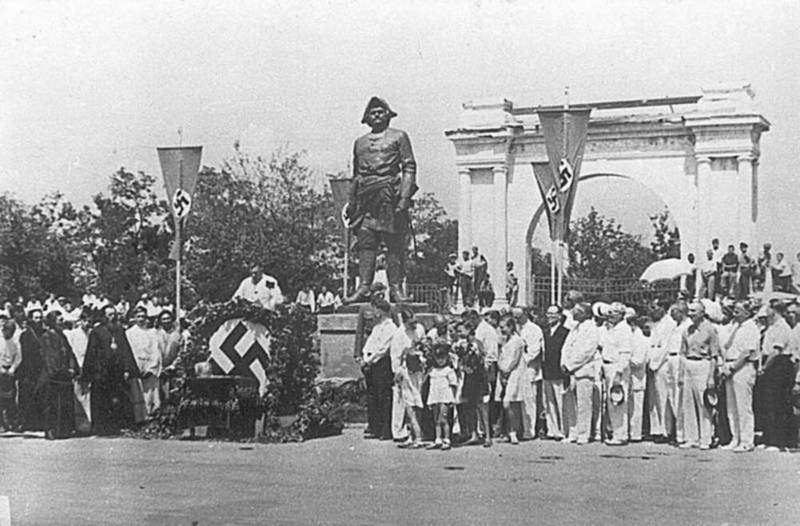
July 18, 1943, Peter I Monument re-inaugurated by occupation authorities

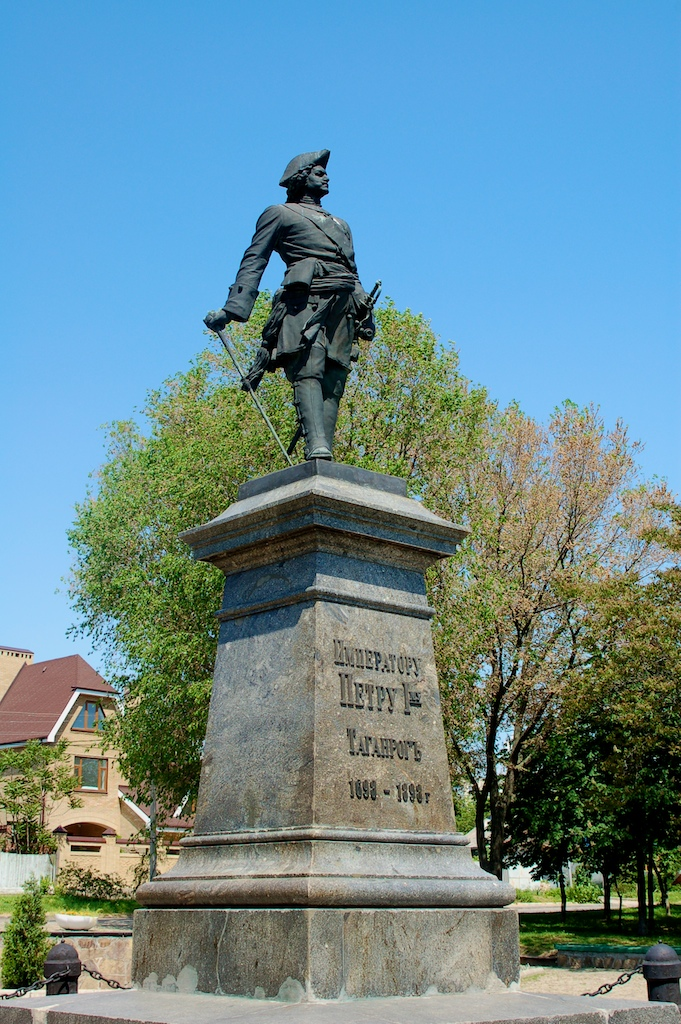
The Peter the Great Monument in the city of Taganrog (photo 2008).

== External links and references ==
- Энциклопедия Таганрога. — Ростов-на-Дону: Ростиздат, 2003
