= Kalitva =

Kalitva Калитва
- Selo
- Location within Belgorod Oblast Location within Russia
- Coordinates: 50°20′N 38°55′E
- Country: Russia
- Region: Belgorod Oblast
- District: Alexeyevsky District
- Time zone: UTC+3:00

Kalitva (Russian: Калитва) is a rural locality (a selo) in Alexeyevsky District, Belgorod Oblast, Russia. The population was 665 as of 2010. There are 3 streets.

== Geography ==
Kalitva is located 43 km southeast of Alexeyevka (the district's administrative centre) by road. Osadcheye is the nearest rural locality.
