= Mikhail Ozimin =

Soviet military commander, general

Mikhail Ivanovich Ozimin
- Ozimin, c. 1945–1946
- Born: 11 September 1898; Kropachyovo, Ufa Governorate, Russian Empire
- Died: 25 August 1946 (aged 47) Tbilisi, Soviet Union
- Allegiance: Russian SFSR; Soviet Union
- Branch: Red Army (later Soviet Army)
- Service years: 1918–1946
- Rank: Lieutenant general
- Commands: 31st Rifle Division; 91st Guards Rifle Division; 28th Rifle Corps
- Conflicts: Russian Civil War; World War II
- Awards: Hero of the Soviet Union; Order of Lenin (2); Order of the Red Banner (3)

Mikhail Ivanovich Ozimin (Russian: Михаил Иванович Озимин; 11 September 1898 – 25 August 1946) was a Soviet Army lieutenant general and a Hero of the Soviet Union.

== Early life and Russian Civil War ==
Ozimin was born on 11 September 1898 at the station of Kropachyovo on the Samara–Zlatoust Railway in Ufa Governorate. During the Russian Civil War, he joined the Asha-Balashov Factory Red Guard detachment in November 1917, and in December he became a member of the Ufa Governorate Council of Combat Organizations of People's Armament (BONV), and from March 1918 was head of the office of the council. Ozimin joined the Bogoyavlensky Factory Red Guard Detachment in May and in September joined the Red Army, serving as adjutant and clerk in the personnel section of the 269th Bogoyavlensky Regiment. From August 1920 Ozimin studied at the Omsk Higher Military School and upon graduation from December 1921 commanded the 14th, 15th, and 16th Separate Special Purpose Battalion. In June 1922 he became commander of the Forces of Special Purpose in Akmola Governorate. During the war, Ozimin fought on the Eastern Front against the forces of Alexander Kolchak, and was concussed in 1919.

== Interwar period ==
From April 1923, Ozimin commanded the 15th Separate Special Purpose Battalion. He became military commissar of the Kokshetau Uyezd Military Commissariat in December 1924, and from December 1928 was military commissar of the Akhtyubinsk and Uralsk District Military Commissariats. After completing the Vystrel course between November 1930 and June 1931, Ozimin commanded the Separate Kazakh Cavalry Regiment. From July 1932, he served as chief of the 1st department of the Military Commissariat of the Kazakh SSSR. Ozimin completed the first course of the Frunze Military Academy in 1934 and was sent to the Belorussian Military District in November 1936, serving as assistant commander of the 6th Rifle Regiment of the 2nd Rifle Division in Minsk. After commanding the 241st Rifle Regiment of the 81st Rifle Division in the Belorussian Military District and then the Kiev Military Districts from July 1937, Ozimin was appointed commander of the 31st Rifle Division of the North Caucasus Military District in November 1938. He graduated from KUVNAS at the Frunze Military Academy in 1941.

== World War II ==
Ozimin continued to command the 31st after Operation Barbarossa began. In October 1941 the division joined the 56th Separate Army, formed in the North Caucasus Military District, which was sent to the Southern Front in November. With the 56th Army, the division fought in the Rostov defensive and offensive operations, during which it recaptured Rostov-on-Don. Ozimin was promoted to major general on 27 December. Subsequently, the division and its army transferred to the North Caucasian Front and later the Black Sea Group of Forces of the Transcaucasian Front, fighting in the Armavir–Maikop and Tuapse defensive operations during the Battle of the Caucasus. In August 1942, Ozimin was arrested and placed under investigation for "losing command and control" of his troops. He was sentenced to ten years in a corrective labor camp by the front military tribunal on 14 August, with the sentence postponed until after the end of the war. Ozimin was appointed head of the combat training department of the staff of the 4th Shock Army in December. A decision of the Military Tribunal of the Kalinin Front on 18 April 1943 expunged the sentence from his record and on the same day he took command of the 91st Guards Rifle Division.

The 91st Guards Rifle Division was under the direct control of the Kalinin Front headquarters from May to July, then transferred to the 39th Army and fought in the Smolensk and Dukhovshchina-Demidov offensives. In mid-September the division conducted an assault crossing of the Velenya river, broke through the German frontline, and captured Dukhovshchina on 19 September receiving the name of the city as an honorific. Ozimin was awarded the Order of the Red Banner twice, first on 27 July and then on 24 September for his leadership of the 91st Guards in these operations. From 20 September, the division was withdrawn to the second echelon of the army and concentrated in the area of Damanovo. Between 24 September and 4 November Ozimin was treated for chronic laryngitis at the Kommunistichesky Hospital in Moscow, then placed at the disposal of the Main Personnel Directorate of the People's Commissariat of Defense while awaiting assignment. In late December he was appointed commander of the 76th Rifle Corps of the 1st Ukrainian Front but did not actually take command.

Instead, Ozimin took command of the 28th Rifle Corps on 16 January 1944. He led the corps as part of the 60th Army in the Zhitomir–Berdichev offensive, the Rovno–Lutsk offensive, the Proskurov–Chernovitsy offensive, the Lvov–Sandomierz offensive, and Sandomierz–Silesian offensive, the Upper Silesian offensive, and the Moravia–Ostrava offensive. During this period it captured Lvov, Dębica, Kraków, Leobschuetz, and Opava, among others. For distinguishing itself during the Lvov–Sandomierz offensive the corps received the name of Lvov as an honorific on 10 August. During the operation, Ozimin was described as having "proved himself proved himself to be a skillful and courageous commander, skillfully using the terrain and improvised methods, and ferrying troops across bodies of water with minimal losses," in addition to leading from the front, "personally inspiring officers and soldiers to defeat the enemy." For his "skillful command of the corps and the completion of its assigned combat objectives," Ozimin, promoted to lieutenant general on 20 April 1945, was awarded the title Hero of the Soviet Union and the Order of Lenin on 29 June 1945.

== Postwar ==
After the end of the war, Ozimin was placed at the disposal of the Main Personnel Directorate in January 1946, then appointed deputy commander-in-chief of the Tbilisi Military District. He served in the same position in the Transcaucasian Military District from May when the Tbilisi Military District was merged to reform the Transcaucasian Military District. He was placed at the disposal of the Commander-in-Chief of the Ground Forces on 16 August, but died in an auto accident in Tbilisi on 25 August.

== Awards ==
Ozimin was a recipient of the following awards and decorations:

- Hero of the Soviet Union
- Order of Lenin (2)
- Order of the Red Banner (3)
- Order of Suvorov, 2nd class
- Order of Kutuzov, 2nd class
- Medals
