= List of people from Taganrog =

This is a list of famous people who have lived in Taganrog. Please add new people and also add the dates they lived in Taganrog, if known.

== Actors, Performers, Cinema ==
- Sergei Bondarchuk, actor and film director, Oscar (Academy Award for Best Foreign Language Film) of 1968, graduated from the Taganrog School Num. 4 in 1938
- Pavel Derevyanko, actor, born in Taganrog in 1976
- Fyodor Dobronravov, actor, born in Taganrog in 1961
- Viktor Dobronravov, actor, born in Taganrog in 1983
- Nikolai Dobrynin, actor, born in Taganrog in 1963
- Anatoly Anatolievich Durov, circus animal trainer, 1926–1928
- Vatslav Dvorzhetsky, Soviet actor, Peoples' Artist of Russia, worked at Taganrog Theatre in 1940–1941
- Victor Dyomin, Soviet cinema critic, editor, writer, actor, born in Taganrog in 1937, graduate of Chekhov Gymnasium (1954)
- Vatslav Mikhalsky, Soviet and Russian writer, screenwriter and editor, born in Taganrog in 1938
- Elena Obraztsova, mezzo-soprano, studied in 1954–1957
- Ivan Perestiani, Soviet actor and film director, one of the founding fathers of Georgian cinematography, born in Taganrog in 1870
- Faina Ranevskaya, actress, Stalin Prize laureate (twice), People's Artist of USSR, born in Taganrog in 1896
- Tofik Shakhverdiev, Soviet and Russian film director and screenwriter, 1940s–1960.
- Petr Shelokhonov, Russian actor of film and theatre, Honorable Actor of Russia, worked at Taganrog Theatre in 1962–1968
- Marianna Tavrog, Soviet Russian documentary film director, born in Taganrog in 1921.
- Vladislav Vetrov, Soviet and Russian actor of film and theatre, Honorable Actor of Russia, 1979 – late 1980s
- Alexander Leonidovich Vishnevsky, actor, one of the founders of Moscow Art Theatre, and friend of Anton Chekhov. Like Chekhov, Vishnevsky was born and studied in Taganrog
- Zinoviy Vysokovskiy, People's Artist of Russia, born and lived in Taganrog in 1932–1956

== Art & architecture ==
- Alexey Adamov, artist, born in Taganrog in 1971
- Taisia Afonina, Soviet Russian artist, studied in 1928–1931
- Klavdiya Balanova, Soviet artist, born in Taganrog in 1915.
- Seraphima Blonskaya, artist, 1875–1947
- Nikolay Chekhov, artist, brother of Anton Chekhov, born in Taganrog in 1858
- Maria Chekhova, artist, sister of Anton Chekhov, born in Taganrog in 1863
- Natalia Duritskaya, artist, born in Taganrog in 1960
- Arkhip Kuindzhi, artist, 1860–1865
- Victor Malinka, artist, illustrator of books for children, born in Taganrog in 1935
- Ivan Martos, studied in the Taganrog Boys Gymnasium
- Yakov Rubanchik, Soviet Russian architect, born in Taganrog in 1899.
- Konstantin Savitsky, artist, born in Taganrog in 1844
- Fyodor Schechtel, architect, three buildings in Taganrog, including the Chekhov Library
- Dmitri Sinodi-Popov, artist, born in Taganrog in 1855 and spent most of his life here
- Andrei Shtakenschneider, architect of the Alferaki Palace
- Nadezhda Shvets, artist, born in Taganrog in 1959
- Oleg Skarainis, Soviet Latvian sculptor, born in Taganrog in 1923.
- François Sainte de Wollant, architect, engineer-general, in charge for construction of the Taganrog seaport in 1804
- William Frederick Yeames, British painter, born in Taganrog in 1835
- Leonid Yegorov, Russian artist and sculptor, born and died in Taganrog 1848–1890

== Authors ==
- Nikolay Yakovlevich Abramovich, Russian writer, historian of Russian literature, poet, born in Taganrog in 1881
- Vladimir Yakovlevich Abramovich, Russian poet, writer and journalist, born in Taganrog in 1877
- Nonna Bannister, Soviet-born American author, born in Taganrog in 1927
- Vladimir Tan-Bogoraz, Russian anthropologist and writer, born and lived in Taganrog until 1886
- Alexander Chekhov, Russian novelist, short story writer, essayist and memoirist, the elder brother of Anton Chekhov, father of Michael Chekhov
- Anton Chekhov, playwright and short-story writer, born in Taganrog in 1860
- Yevgeny Garshin, novelist and publisher, 1900–1911
- Dmitri Girs, writer, born in Taganrog in 1836
- Oleg Haslavsky, Russian poet and translator.
- Boris Izyumskiy, Soviet writer, studied in Taganrog
- Andrey Korsakov, Soviet Russian and Ukrainian linguist and language philosopher. Born in Taganrog in 1916.
- Alexander Korsun, writer, studied and worked in Taganrog, 1826–1837,
- Nestor Kukolnik, playwright, poet and politician, 1857–1868
- Alexander Lakier, historian and founder of Russian heraldry, born and died in Taganrog
- Vitali Melentiev, Soviet Russian writer, 1918– mid-1930s
- Vatslav Mikhalsky, Soviet and Russian writer, screenwriter and editor, born in Taganrog in 1938
- Osip Notovich, writer, born and studied in Taganrog
- Valentin Ovechkin, writer, studied in 1913–1919, 1925–1931 and 1950s
- Valentin Parnakh, Poet, translator, choreographer. Founder of the Russian Jazz music. Born in Taganrog in 1891
- Sophia Yakovlevna Parnok, poet and translator, born in Taganrog in 1885
- Konstantin Paustovsky, writer, 1916
- Isaac Yakovlevich Pavlovsky, journalist and writer, born in Taganrog in 1853
- Iosif Prut, playwright, born in Taganrog in 1900
- Alexander Pushkin, poet, stayed in June 1820
- Solomon Rubin, Neo-Hebrew author, 1873–1878
- Nikolay Fedorovich Sherbina, poet, 1820s–1850
- Konstantin Staniukovich, writer 1870–1871
- Mikhail Tanich – poet and songwriter, born in Taganrog in 1923
- Yelizaveta Tarakhovskaya, writer, poet, translator, born in Taganrog in 1891
- Ivan Vasilenko, writer, 1901–1966
- Maximilian Voloshin, Russian poet, early childhood years (1778–1882)
- Sergey Zvantsev, writer. Born in Taganrog in 1893.
- Eugeniusz Żytomirski, Polish poet, playwright, novelist. Born in Taganrog in 1911

== Russian Czars ==
- Peter I (Peter the Great) founder of Taganrog in 1698
- Alexander I died in Taganrog in 1825
- Louise of Baden (Yelizaveta Alexeevna) 1825–1826

== Military leaders, statesmen, war heroes, revolutionaries, politicians ==
- Anatoly Aistov, Soviet counter-admiral, born in Taganrog in 1917
- Viktor Anpilov, Russian politician and trade unionist, studied and worked in Taganrog in 1960–1964
- Mikhail Baturin, Soviet intelligence officer, father to Yuri Baturin, born in Taganrog in 1904
- Boris Mikhailovich Belousov, USSR Minister of Engineering Industry in 1987–1989 and Soviet Minister of Defence Industry in 1989–1991, graduated from the Taganrog University (TSURE) in 1958.
- Cornelius Cruys, Russian Navy admiral of Norwegian descent, Commander of Taganrog's fortress in 1698–1702, 1711
- Anton Denikin, Lieutenant-General, held in Taganrog General Headquarters from August 8, 1919 to December 23, 1919
- Hermann von Eichhorn, German Generalfeldmarschall during World War I, spring 1918.
- Ivan Furugelm, (Swedish spelling Johan Hampus Furuhjelm) vice-admiral, explorer, President of Russian-American Company, Governor of Taganrog in 1874–1876, Governor of Russian America, 1859–1863
- Kuzma Galitsky Soviet Army general, born in Taganrog in 1897, Hero of the Soviet Union
- Giuseppe Garibaldi, Italian patriot and military leader of Risorgimento, several visits in 1832–1833
- Iosif Gershtein, commander of Azov Flotilla in 1918.
- Leonid Gobyato, Russian general, inventor of the first Russian mortar, born and lived in Taganrog until 1887
- Ivan Golubets, Hero of the Soviet Union, born in Taganrog in 1916, studied and worked in Taganrog until WWII
- Andrey Grechko, Marshal of USSR, Hero of the Soviet Union, military service in Taganrog in 1919–1926
- Victor Grushko, deputy Head of Soviet Committee of State Security in 1987–1991, born in Taganrog in 1930
- Konstantin Igelström, Decembrist, founded and headed the secret Society of Military Friends in 1818; settled in Taganrog in 1843, where he died in 1851
- Ivan Kadatsky-Rudnev Flag officer 1st rank, commander of Amur Military Flotilla. Born in Taganrog in 1889, graduated from Taganrog Naval School.
- Dimitrios Kallergis, Greek soldier and statesman. Early 19th century (according to several sources born in Taganrog, or settled in Taganrog around 1806).
- Sir John Noble Kennedy, British major-general, Artillery Liaison Officer of the 1 Corps of the anti-Bolshevik White Russian Army, August 1919 – December 24, 1919
- Ivan Krasnov, Russian general responsible for defence of Taganrog during Siege of Taganrog in 1855
- Nikolay Krasnov, Russian lieutenant-general, hero of Crimean War, since the 1850s until 1900
- Lev Kultshitskiy, rear-admiral, Governor of Taganrog in 1868–1873
- Ivan Kupin, Soviet mayor-general, graduated from Chekhov Gymnasium, worked in Taganrog.
- Pavel Stepanovich Kutakhov, Commander of USSR air forces since 1964, Marshal of air forces in 1972, twice Hero of the Soviet Union, studied and worked in Taganrog in 1929–1935
- Alexander Kutepov, lieutenant-general of the Russian White Army, leader of the Russian All-Military Union in 1928–1930. Commander of Taganrog's garrison in December 1917 – January 1918.
- Mikhail Andrianovich Lavrov, admiral, polar explorer, Governor of Taganrog in 1857–1864
- Pavel Maksutov, rear-admiral, Governor of Taganrog in 1876–1882
- Mikhail Mesheryakov Soviet Army general, Hero of the Soviet Union, born in Taganrog in 1896
- Andrey Martynov, Russian general, studied in Taganrog's Boys' Gymnasium
- Vladimir Mikhaylov, former commander-in-chief of the Russian Air Force, served at Taganrog air force regiment in 1966–1975
- Maksim Mishenko, founder and leader of the youth movement Rumol (Young Russia), born in Taganrog in 1977
- Semion Morozov, commissar of Taganrog antifascist resistance in WWII, posthumously Hero of the Soviet Union, born (1914), lived and died (1943) in Taganrog
- Pavel Pereleshin, rear-admiral, Governor of Taganrog in 1865–1866
- Pavel Pustoshkin, vice-admiral, served in Taganrog, commander of shipbuilding yard and commander of the Taganrog seaport. 1769–1772, 1787–1790.
- Alexandre Remi, mayor-general, brother officer of Mikhail Lermontov, 1850s–1871
- Paul von Rennenkampf, general of Baltic German descent, 1917–1918
- Boris Rivkin, Soviet mayor-general of aviation, graduate of the Chekhov Gymnasium.
- Pyotr Schmidt, revolutionary, 1890–1893
- Georgy Sedov, Russian Arctic explorer, born in Taganrog's district in 1877
- Alexey Senyavin, admiral, commander of Taganrog's fortress in 1769–1774
- Yevgeny Shapovalov, mayor-general, born in Taganrog in 1904
- Aleksei Shein, Russian boyar, statesman, the first Russian Generalissimos, 1697–1698
- Ivan Shestakov, admiral, Governor of Taganrog in 1866–1868
- Nadezhda Sigida, revolutionary, born (1862) and lived in Taganrog, executed in 1889 (Kara katorga)
- Sokrates Starynkiewicz, general and governor of Warsaw, born in Taganrog in 1820
- Fyodor Ushakov, admiral, late 1770s
- Ioannis Varvakis, Greek patriot, benefactor and merchant, 1813–1825
- Ippolit Vogak, rear-admiral, Governor of Taganrog in 1885–1887
- Semion Voskov, Russian revolutionary, died in Taganrog in 1920
- Pavel Zelenoy, rear-admiral, Governor of Taganrog in 1882–1885

== Music ==
- Achilles Alferaki, composer, 1846–1888
- Roman Bilyk (ru:Билык, Роман Витальевич), leader of the Russian pop band Zveri, born in 1977
- David Blok (ru:Блок, Давид Семёнович), Soviet composer, born in Taganrog in 1888
- Adolf Brodsky, violinist, born in Taganrog in 1851
- Nikolay Lebedev (ru:Лебедев, Николай Николаевич), musician, producer, DJ, born in Taganrog in 1976
- Samuel Maykapar, composer, pianist and author of many pianoforte pieces for kids, 1867–1885
- Gaetano Molla, director of the Italian Opera in Taganrog, 1860s–1880s
- Valentin Parnakh, Poet, translator, choreographer. Founder of the Russian Jazz music. Born in Taganrog in 1891
- Witold Rowicki, Polish conductor, born in 1914
- Vyacheslav Suk, Russian violinist, conductor and composer, worked in 1887–1890, founder of the music classes at The Tchaikovsky Children's School of Music in Taganrog
- Peter Ilyich Tchaikovsky, composer, frequently stayed in his brother's house (Ippolit Tchaikovsky) in Taganrog
- Anatoly Zagot, Soviet Russian folk singer, born in Taganrog in 1936
- Vladimir Grigorievich Zakharov, composer, Peoples' Artist of USSR, art director of Pyatnitsky Choir, student of the Chekhov Gymnasium, 1912–1921
- Vasily Zolotarev, composer, born in Taganrog in 1872
- Dmitri Chkurin, leader of the Russian Industrial Metal band Illidiance, born in 1984
- Viktorija Loba (born 1988), Macedonian singer

== Pilots and explorers ==
- Vitus Jonassen Bering, Russian-Danish navigator and explorer, 1711–1712
- Vladimir Dzhanibekov, space pilot, twice Hero of the Soviet Union, studied at Taganrog State University of Radioengineering and served military service in 1962–1970.
- Ivan Furugelm, (Finnish spelling Johan Hampus Furuhjelm) vice-admiral, explorer, President of Russian-American Company, Governor of Taganrog in 1874–1876, Governor of Russian America, 1859–1863
- Boris Galitsky (ru:Галицкий, Борис Карпович), Soviet Russian test pilot, Hero of the Soviet Union, born in Taganrog in 1914
- Mikhail Andrianovich Lavrov, admiral, polar explorer, Governor of Taganrog in 1857–1864
- Anatoly Lomakin (ru:Ломакин, Анатолий Георгиевич), fighter-pilot, Hero of the Soviet Union, born in Taganrog in 1921
- Yury Malyshev, space pilot, twice Hero of the Soviet Union, studied in Taganrog in 1949–1959
- Viktor Pugachyov, Soviet Russian test pilot, Hero of the Soviet Union, inventor of the Pugachev's Cobra maneuver on Su-27, born in Taganrog in 1948
- Georgy Sedov, Russian Arctic explorer, born in Taganrog district in 1877

== Religion ==
- Saint Pavel of Taganrog, around 1825/1830–1879

== Science, Heroes of Socialist Labor, Business people ==
- Sergei Alphéraky, Russian ornithologist and entomologist, in 1850–70s
- Yevgeni Andreyev, Privy Councilor, founder of the Russian Technical Society, author of the law for the child labor (1882), born in Taganrog in 1829
- Alexey Astakhov, director of TAGMET, 1921–1984
- Robert Bartini, designer of amphibious aircraft, 1946–1952
- Nikolai Belelubsky, engineer, scientist, famous designer of bridges, graduated from Taganrog Boys Gymnasium in 1862
- Georgy Beriev, designer of amphibious aircraft, 1933–1970s
- Nikolay Bogoraz – Russian pioneer of phalloplasty and penile implant surgery, born and studied in Taganrog
- Leonid Gobyato, Russian general, inventor of the first Russian mortar, born and lived in Taganrog until 1887
- Aleksandr Viktorovich Fyodorov, professor, media educator, non-fiction writer, editor. Lives and works in Taganrog.
- Hanon Izakson, designer of the first Soviet self-propelled farm machines, 1953–1985
- Anatoly Kalyaev, scientist, founder of the research institute of multiprocessing computer systems etc., Hero of Socialist Labor, 1954–2004
- Alexandre Koyré, French philosopher, born in Taganrog in 1892
- Vladimir Alexandrovich Lebedev, Russian pilot, aircraft builder, recipient of Légion d'honneur, founder of Taganrog Airplane Factory, 1915–1916
- Victor Litvinov, Soviet aircraft designer, responsible for mass production of military aircraft, Minister of the General Engineering Industry in 1965–1973, born in Taganrog in 1910.
- Mikhail Nagibin, honorary aircraft builder of the Soviet Union, born in Taganrog in 1930, worked in Taganrog until 1980.
- Alexey Nicolaychuk, developer of influential overclock tool MSI Afterburner (RivaTuner)
- Vladimir Petlyakov, Soviet aircraft designer, born in a village near Taganrog, studied in Taganrog in 1899–1910
- Rosa Pavlovsky de Rosemberg, Russian-born (in Taganrog, 1862) Argentine physician (d. 1936)
- Boris Podolsky, physicist, born in Taganrog in 1896
- Yuriy Rumer, Soviet physicist, worked in Taganrog in 1946–1948
- Alexander Samarskiy, mathematician, studied in Taganrog in 1932–1936
- Georgy Sergeev, Soviet designer of artillery and rocket systems, Hero of Socialist Labor, born in Taganrog in 1911
- Lazar Shaulov, business person, lived in Taganrog in 1990s.
- Maria Smith-Falkner, economist, born in Taganrog in 1878.
- Vladimir Tan-Bogoraz, Russian anthropologist and writer, born and lived in Taganrog until 1886
- Nicolai Stepanovitch Turczaninow, Russian botanist, 1845–1850s or 1860s
- Panayis Athanase Vagliano, Greek merchant and shipowner

== Sports ==
- Aleksandr Balakhnin, football player, played for FC Taganrog in 1975–1976
- Vladimir Dvorkovich, international chess arbiter, chairman of the judge board of Russian Federation, father to Arcady Dvorkovich, born in Taganrog in 1937, graduate of the Chekhov Gymnasium.
- Aleksei Gerasimenko, Russian football player, born in Taganrog in 1970
- Barys Haravoy, Russian and Belarusian football player, played for FC Taganrog in 1991–1995
- Aleksandr Karatayev, Russian football coach and player, born in Taganrog in 1973
- Nikolai Krivun, chess player, Correspondence chess champion of Russia (1972–1973), correspondence chess champion of Europe (1978–83, 1983–88).
- Igor Kudelin, Russian basketball player, silver medalist at 1998 FIBA World Championship
- Oleg Perepetchenov, heavy athlete, bronze medal at the Olympic Games (2004) (category Men's 77 Kilograms), silver medal in the Weightlifting World Championship in 2002, graduate of David Rigert's weightlifting school in Taganrog
- Eduard Posylayev, former Russian professional footballer
- David Rigert, heavy athletics World Champions (6 times), Olympic Champion (1976 Summer Olympics), European Champion (9 times), Soviet Union Champion (7 times), 63 world records and 69 USSR records, in Taganrog since the 1990s and alderman at Taganrog City Council since 2004
- Igor Saprykin, Finswimming World Champion in 2004, several European Champion and Russia Champion titles, born in Taganrog in 1980
- Aleksandr Savin, Soviet Russian volleyball player, Olympic Champion (silver at 1976 Summer Olympics and gold at 1980 Summer Olympics), born in Taganrog in 1957
- Aleksei Sereda, Russian football player, coach, director of FC Taganrog, born in Taganrog in 1966
- Dmitriy Shevchenko, discus thrower, silver medalist at World and European Championships, born in Taganrog in 1968
- Igor Sklyarov, former Russian footballer, gold medal as member of the Soviet football team at 1988 Summer Olympics
- Nadezhda Slavinskaya-Belonenko (born Nadezhda Belonenko), tennis player, four-time USSR champion, in the national top ten tennis players in 1943–1955
- Sergey Superata, canoeist, gold medalist at World and European Championships, Soviet Union Champion, in Taganrog – 1976–1986
- Sergey Syrtsov, heavy athlete, 10 world records, silver medalist at 1992 Summer Olympics and 1996 Summer Olympics, World Champion (2 times), European Champion in 1995, Champion of Russia in 1997, has lived in Taganrog since 1994
- Anatoly Tishchenko, canoeist, gold medalist at European Championship in 1969, gold at World C. in 1970, Soviet Union Champion (9 times), born in 1943 and has lived in Taganrog
- Anatoli Tishchenko (junior), 7-time World Champ (1991–1999), Champion of Russia in 1990– 2004. canoeist, bronze medalist at 1996 Summer Olympics, born in Taganrog
- Olga Tishchenko, Russian sprint canoer, silver medalist at 1999 ICF Canoe Sprint World Championships in Milan, works in Taganrog
- Anatoli Vanzhula, Russian former professional footballer
- Victoria Voronina, Russian gymnast, gold medalist at 2010 Trampoline World Championships, born in Taganrog
- Arkady Vyatchanin, swimmer, champion of Europe in 2006 (100-meter backstroke), bronze medalist at 2008 Summer Olympics has lived and trained in Taganrog since 1999.
- Arkady Fyodorovich Vyatchanin, swimmer, nine-time champion of RSFSR, coach of the Soviet Union swimming team in 1965–1971, has lived and worked in Taganrog since 1999
- Yuliya Yefimova, swimmer, World Champion, European Champion, has lived and trained in Taganrog
- Viktor Zhylin, Ukrainian football defender and forward and manager, the master of sports, the honored trainer of Ukraine, born in Taganrog in 1923.

== See also ==
- List of Russian people
- List of Russian-language poets
