= Eupithecia accurata =

Scientific classification
- Kingdom: Animalia
- Phylum: Arthropoda
- Clade: Pancrustacea
- Class: Insecta
- Order: Lepidoptera
- Family: Geometridae
- Genus: Eupithecia
- Species: E. accurata

Binomial name
- Eupithecia accurata Staudinger, 1892

Synonyms
- Eupithecia subscalptata Schütze, 1961

Species of geometer moth

Eupithecia accurata is a moth in the family Geometridae. It is found in Turkmenistan, Uzbekistan, northern Iran and Kazakhstan.

Adult specimens have light grey fore- and hindwings with checked fringes on both pairs of wings. The forewings have a dark and slanted central band marked with two light transverse lines and a sprinkling of light scales. The basal portion of the wing has some inconspicuous sprinkling of darker scales, followed by a blackish, partially faded extra-basal line. The wing's outer area is brownish. The hindwings have a darkened inner margin and a narrow, faded, brownish transverse patch near the lower half of the outer margin.

The shape of the forewings was described by Otto Staudinger as similar to those of E. separata or E. scalptata except more pointed at the anterior corner, and much longer and narrower than those of E. subpulchrata, three species he noted resembled E. accurata. He gave the wingspan of the species as 22–24 mm. Eduard Schütze gave (Note: In his 1961 description of E. subscalptata, now considered a junior synonym of E. accurata) a slightly larger wingspan of 25 mm.
