= Shaulov =

Shaulov is a surname. Notable people with the surname include:

- Lazar Shaulov (born 1969), Russian businessman
- Sasson Ifram Shaulov (born 2002), Israeli singer
