= Scopula kuldschaensis =

Scientific classification
- Domain: Eukaryota
- Kingdom: Animalia
- Phylum: Arthropoda
- Class: Insecta
- Order: Lepidoptera
- Family: Geometridae
- Genus: Scopula
- Species: S. kuldschaensis

Binomial name
- Scopula kuldschaensis (Alphéraky, 1883)

Synonyms
- Stigma kuldschaensis Alphéraky, 1883; Stigma atraria Bang-Haas, 1906

Species of geometer moth in subfamily Sterrhinae

Scopula kuldschaensis is a moth of the family Geometridae. It was first described by Sergei Alphéraky in 1883. It is found in China, Kyrgyzstan and Kazakhstan.

== Subspecies ==
- Scopula kuldschaensis kuldschaensis (China: Sinkiang, Tien-Shan mountains)
- Scopula kuldschaensis negrita (Thierry-Mieg, 1905) (Issyk-kul)
