= Vladimir Sedov =

Vladimir Sedov may refer to:

- Vladimir Sedov (weightlifter) (1988–2023), Kazakhstani weightlifter
- Vladimir Sedov (actor) (1928–2009), Soviet and Russian actor
- Vladimir Sedov (scientist) (born 1960), Russian archeologist
- Vladimir Sedov, the protagonist of Defence Counsel Sedov, a 1988 Soviet film
