= Pseudoterpna simplex =

Scientific classification
- Kingdom: Animalia
- Phylum: Arthropoda
- Class: Insecta
- Order: Lepidoptera
- Family: Geometridae
- Genus: Pseudoterpna
- Species: P. simplex

Binomial name
- Pseudoterpna simplex Alphéraky, 1892

Synonyms
- Pseudoterpna pruinata var. simplex Alphéraky, 1892

Species of moth

Pseudoterpna simplex is a moth of the family Geometridae first described by Sergei Alphéraky in 1892. It is found in central Asia, including Xinjiang in China.
