= List of Spartak athletes =

This is a list of sportspeople from Spartak Voluntary Sports Society. Most of them are World Champions or Olympic medalists.

== Artistic gymnastics ==
Athletes, who competed in artistic gymnastics:

- Yelena Davydova
- Nellie Kim

== Athletics ==
Athletes, who competed in athletics:

- Pyotr Bolotnikov
- Sergey Budalov
- Nadezhda Chizhova
- Lyudmila Dzhigalova
- Vladimir Golubnichy
- Natalya Lisovskaya
- Faina Melnik
- Antanas Mikenas
- Mariya Pinigina
- Sergey Senyukov

== Basketball ==
Basketball players:

- Soviet era:
  - Aleksandr Belov
- Post-Soviet:
  - Andrei Kirilenko

== Biathlon ==
Athletes, who competed in biathlon:

- Anatoly Alyabyev

== Boxing ==
Athletes, who competed in boxing:

- Boris Lagutin
- Lev Mukhin

== Chess ==
Athletes, who competed in chess:

- Ashot Nadanian
- Tigran Petrosian

== Cross-country skiing ==
Athletes, who competed in cross-country skiing:

- Maria Gusakova
- Svetlana Nageykina
- Yuri Skobov
- Nikolay Zimyatov
- Rudolf Alexandrov

== Figure skating ==
Athletes, who competed in figure skating:

- Marina Klimova
- Viktor Petrenko
- Sergei Ponomarenko
- Lyudmila Smirnova
- Andrei Suraikin

== Football ==
Athletes, who competed in football:

- Igor Netto
- Nikolai Starostin

== Handball ==
- Tetyana Hlushchenko (handball)

== Ice hockey ==
Athletes, who competed in ice hockey:

- Alexander Yakushev

== Mountaineering ==
Athletes, who competed in mountaineering:

- Vitaly Abalakov

== Speed skating ==
Athletes, who competed in speed skating:

- Klara Guseva
- Igor Zhelezovski

== Tennis ==
Athletes, who competed in tennis:

- Nadezhda Belonenko
- Elena Dementieva
- Dinara Safina
- Marat Safin
- Andrey Rublev
