= Scopula cumulata =

Scientific classification
- Domain: Eukaryota
- Kingdom: Animalia
- Phylum: Arthropoda
- Class: Insecta
- Order: Lepidoptera
- Family: Geometridae
- Genus: Scopula
- Species: S. cumulata

Binomial name
- Scopula cumulata (Alphéraky, 1883)

Synonyms
- Acidalia cumulata Alphéraky, 1883; Acidalia beckeraria cretaria Staudinger, 1892

Species of geometer moth in subfamily Sterrhinae

Scopula cumulata is a moth of the family Geometridae. It was described by Sergei Alphéraky in 1883. It is found in China and Kyrgyzstan.

== Subspecies ==
- Scopula cumulata cumulata (China)
- Scopula cumulata alaiana Viidalepp, 1988 (Kyrghyzstan)
