= Pseudoterpna coronillaria =

Scientific classification
- Kingdom: Animalia
- Phylum: Arthropoda
- Clade: Pancrustacea
- Class: Insecta
- Order: Lepidoptera
- Family: Geometridae
- Genus: Pseudoterpna
- Species: P. coronillaria

Binomial name
- Pseudoterpna coronillaria (Hübner, 1796)

Synonyms
- Geometra coronillaria Hübner, [1817]; Geometra cytisaria var. cinerascens Zeller, 1847; Pseudoterpna armoraciaria Oberthür, 1896

Species of moth

Pseudoterpna coronillaria, the Jersey emerald or gorse emerald, is a moth of the family Geometridae. The species was first described by Jacob Hübner in 1796. It is known from Spain, Portugal, the Pyrenees, western and southern France, Corsica, Sardinia, Sicily, Italy, Samos, Rhodes, Turkey, Israel, Lebanon, northern Jordan and North Africa. It has not been reported from mainland Great Britain, but is present on Jersey, where it was previously overlooked as a form of the grass emerald, until 2001 when it was correctly identified.

The wingspan is 36–40 millimetres (1.4–1.6 in).

They are on wing in June and July in western Europe.

The larvae feed on Genista tinctoria, Ulex species and broom.

== Subspecies ==
- Pseudoterpna coronillaria coronillaria (Spain, Portugal, the Pyrenees, western and southern France, Corsica, Sardinia, north-western Italy up to northern Tuscany)
- Pseudoterpna coronillaria algirica Wehrli, 1929 (North Africa)
- Pseudoterpna coronillaria cinerascens (Zeller, 1847) (western Turkey, Samos, Rhodes)
- Pseudoterpna coronillaria axillaria Guenée, [1858] (southern Turkey, Lebanon)
- Pseudoterpna coronillaria halperini Hausmann, 1996 (Israel, northern Jordan)
- Pseudoterpna coronillaria flamignii Hausmann, 1997 (central and southern Italy, Sicily)
