= Eupithecia subpulchrata =

Scientific classification
- Domain: Eukaryota
- Kingdom: Animalia
- Phylum: Arthropoda
- Class: Insecta
- Order: Lepidoptera
- Family: Geometridae
- Genus: Eupithecia
- Species: E. subpulchrata

Binomial name
- Eupithecia subpulchrata Alpheraky, 1883

Synonyms
- Eupithecia separata subpulchrata Alpheraky, 1883

Species of moth

Eupithecia subpulchrata is a moth in the family Geometridae. It is found in central Asia.
