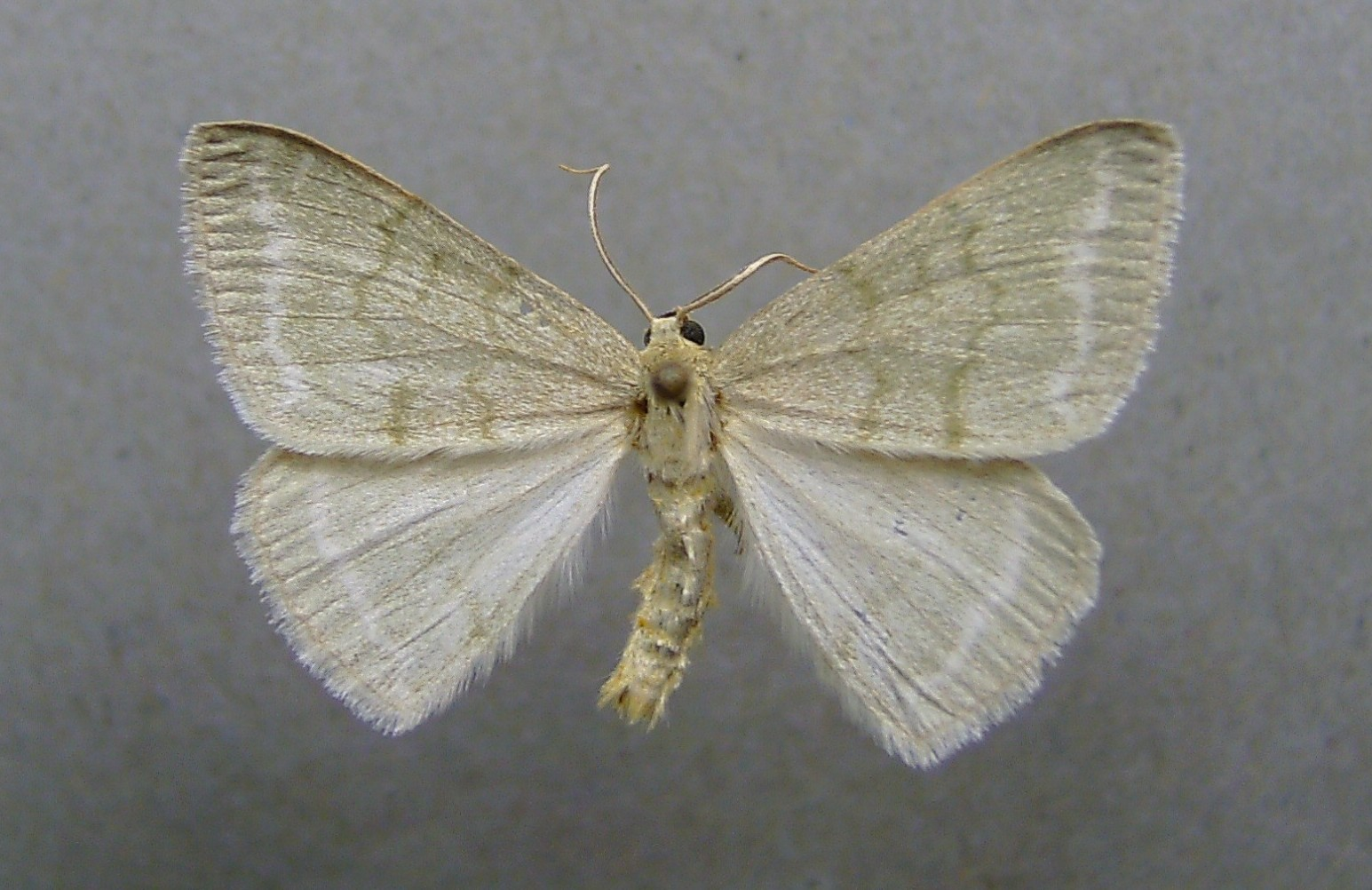
- Pseudoterpna pruinata

Scientific classification
- Kingdom: Animalia
- Phylum: Arthropoda
- Clade: Pancrustacea
- Class: Insecta
- Order: Lepidoptera
- Family: Geometridae
- Tribe: Pseudoterpnini
- Genus: Pseudoterpna; Hübner, [1823]

= Pseudoterpna =

Genus of moths

Pseudoterpna is a genus of moths in the family Geometridae first described by Jacob Hübner in 1823.

== Description ==
Palpi porrect (extending forward), the second joint clothed with hair and reaching beyond the sharp frontal tuft, where the third joint is naked and varying in length. Hind tibia of male usually dilated and typically ending in a slight process on upperside and with a fold containing a tuft of long hair and two pairs of short spurs. Abdomen with short spreading dorsal tufts on medial segments. Both wings with crenulate (scalloped) margin. Forewings with vein 3 from near angle of cell. Vein 5 from below upper angle and vein 6 from angle. Veins 7, 8, 9 and 10 stalked and vein 11 free or anastomosing (fusing) with vein 12. Hindwings long and vein 3 from angle of cell. Vein 5 from near upper angle and vein 7 from before angle.

== Species ==
- Pseudoterpna coronillaria (Hübner, [1817])
  - Pseudoterpna coronillaria coronillaria (Hübner, [1817])
  - Pseudoterpna coronillaria algirica Wehrli, 1930
  - Pseudoterpna coronillaria axillaria Guenée, [1858]
  - Pseudoterpna coronillaria cinerascens (Zeller, 1847)
  - Pseudoterpna coronillaria flamignii Hausmann, 1997
  - Pseudoterpna coronillaria halperini Hausmann, 1996
- Pseudoterpna corsicaria (Rambur, 1833) (=Pseudoterpna corsicaria ramburaria Oberthür, 1916)
- Pseudoterpna lesuraria Lucas, 1933
- Pseudoterpna pruinata (Hufnagel, 1767)
- Pseudoterpna rectistrigaria Wiltshire, 1948
- Pseudoterpna simplex Alphéraky, 1892
