= Pseudoterpna rectistrigaria =

Scientific classification
- Kingdom: Animalia
- Phylum: Arthropoda
- Class: Insecta
- Order: Lepidoptera
- Family: Geometridae
- Genus: Pseudoterpna
- Species: P. rectistrigaria

Binomial name
- Pseudoterpna rectistrigaria Wiltshire, 1948

Species of moth

Pseudoterpna rectistrigaria is a moth of the family Geometridae first described by Wiltshire in 1948. It is found on Cyprus.

The wingspan is about 30 mm.
