= Unitile =

Russian building material conglomerate

Unitile Group of Companies
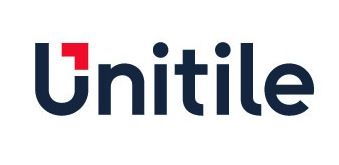
- Native name: ГК «Юнитайл»
- Company type: Privately held company (ООO)
- Industry: Production of ceramic tiles, bricks and building material, Retail
- Founded: 2007; 18 years ago
- Founder: Lazar Shaulov
- Headquarters: Russia, Shakhty
- Key people: Artem Polyakov (Director general)
- Products: Building material
- Number of employees: 2069
- Website: www.unitile.ru

The Unitile Group of Companies (Russian: ГК «Юнитайл») is a Russian holding company specializing in the production and sale of facing tiles, ceramic and porcelain tiles, decorative elements, and bricks. Founded in 2007, the group originated on the site of the Stroyfarfor plant (Russian: Стройфарфор), which was then a leading Russian manufacturer of facing tiles.

== History ==
During the early 2000s, the Russian construction sector expanded rapidly, with annual growth rates averaging 10–14% between 2003 and 2008, according to the Russian Federal State Statistics Service. Concurrently, the domestic market for facing tiles grew by 20–25% per year, driven by the replacement of outdated wall-finishing methods like water-based paint with modern tile solutions.

In 2007, entrepreneur Lazar Shaulov consolidated his assets into the Unitile Group of Companies, a holding entity established to streamline management. The group initially comprised:

- The Stroyfarfor Plant in Shakhty (a leading Russian tile producer),
- The Vladimirskaya high-melting clay mine (Rostov Oblast),
- The Voronezh Ceramic Factory,
- The Quartz Plant (Saint Petersburg), and
- The Markin Brick Factory (Rostov Oblast).

At its founding, Unitile controlled approximately 25% of Russia’s facing tile and ceramic porcelain tile production.

As of 2023, the group’s combined annual output totals 26 million m² of facing and ceramic porcelain tiles. Its flagship facility, the Shakhty plant (formerly Stroyfarfor), produces 17.6 million m² annually, while the Voronezh factory contributes 8.4 million m². In 2018, the Russian market for these products reached 200 million m², with domestic production accounting for 172 million m².

=== Timeline ===
The origins of Unitile’s operations trace back to 1954, when the Voronezh Ceramic Factory was established with an initial production capacity of 1.18 million m^{2} per year. A decade later, in 1964, the Shakhty Faience Plant began operations, and by 1978, the facility expanded its output with a dedicated ceramic tile production site capable of manufacturing 1.4 million m^{2} annually.

Mining operations at the Vladimirskaya high-melting clay deposit commenced in 1993, providing raw materials for the group’s growing production needs. Significant modernization followed in 1998, including the technical re-equipment of the whiteware production site and the launch of two new facing tile lines. The following year, in 1999, the company established a national distributor network, opening regional subsidiaries in Rostov on Don and Novosibirsk.

The 2000s marked further diversification: ceramic porcelain tile production began in 2005, and the Shakhty plant introduced dry mix mortars in 2006. In 2007, the Unitile holding group («Юнитайл») was formally established, consolidating its subsidiaries under a unified brand. The Unitile name was officially introduced to the market in 2009.

Expansion continued into the 2010s, with mining operations starting at the Fedorovskoe white-burning clay deposit in 2012 and the debut of the Gracia Ceramica brand in 2013. In 2016, the Voronezh Ceramic Factory received the “Construction Glory” award and an honorary diploma from the Russian Union of Builders for its contributions to the construction sector. Finally, in 2017, the Shakhty plant’s modernization program was listed among the "100 Governor’s Investment Projects," underscoring its strategic importance.

=== Management ===
- Lazar Shaulov (2007–2014)
- Andrey Fradkin (2014–2015)
- Ruslan Nikitin (2016–2018)
- Evgeniy Fedorov (2018–2019)
- Artem Polyakov (2019–present)

== Structure of UNITILE group of companies ==
The UNITILE Group of Companies comprises three production facilities in Russia, two raw material mining and processing subsidiaries, a sales network across Russia and CIS countries, warehouse complexes, and a logistics center. Key entities include:

- Shakhty Ceramics LTD (ООО «Шахтинская керамика»): Operates a facing-tile and ceramic-porcelain-tile production facility in Shakhty, Rostov Oblast. In 2017, the company reported revenues of 3.505 billion rubles and a net profit of 78.2 million rubles. It is wholly owned by the Cyprus-based offshore company Simidella Limited.
- Voronezh Ceramics LTD (ООО «Воронежская керамика»): Manages a facing-tile and ceramic-porcelain-tile production site in Voronezh. In 2017, revenues totaled 1.153 billion rubles, with a net profit of 22.2 million rubles. It is also fully controlled by Simidella Limited.
- Vladimirskaya High-Melting Clay Deposit: Located in Krasnosulinsky District, Rostov Oblast, this mining operation reported 2017 revenues of 611.4 million rubles and a net profit of 32.1 million rubles. Shakhty Ceramics LLC holds a 91.67% stake in the deposit.
- Markin Brick Factory: Based in Oktyabrsky District, Rostov Oblast, it is the largest producer of facing ceramic bricks in southern Russia.
- Unitile Trading House: Handles domestic and international sales operations.
- Unitile Holding Management Company LLC (ООО «УК Юнитайл»): Established in late 2018, this entity oversees corporate governance. As of July 2019, no financial disclosures were publicly available. It is fully owned by Simidella Limited.
