= Pseudoterpna lesuraria =

Scientific classification
- Kingdom: Animalia
- Phylum: Arthropoda
- Class: Insecta
- Order: Lepidoptera
- Family: Geometridae
- Genus: Pseudoterpna
- Species: P. lesuraria

Binomial name
- Pseudoterpna lesuraria D. Lucas, 1933

Species of moth

Pseudoterpna lesuraria is a moth of the family Geometridae first described by Daniel Lucas in 1933. It is found in Morocco.
