= Alferaki Palace =

Museum of local history in Taganrog, Rostov, Russia

Museum of Local Lore and History (Alferaki Palace)
- Историко-краеведческий музей г.Таганрога (дворец Н.Д.Алфераки)
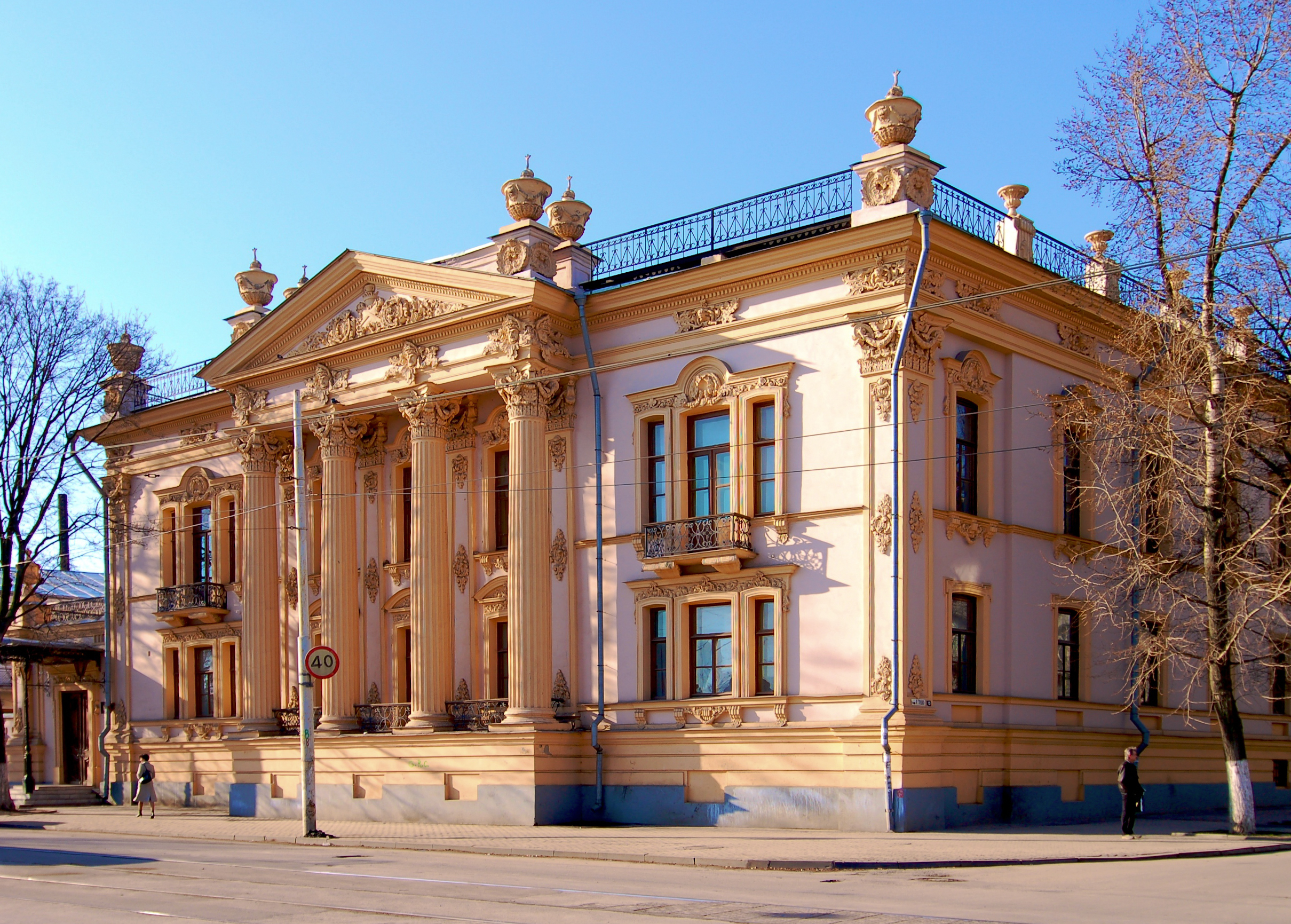
- Established: 1848, 1927 (as a museum)
- Location: Ulitsa Frunze 41, Taganrog
- Coordinates: 47°12′48″N 38°55′41″E
- Type: Museum of local history
- Director: Galina Alexandrovna Krupnitskaya (Russian: Галина Александровна Крупницкая)
- Public transit access: "Museum of Local Lore and History" Tram Stop

Alferaki Palace is a museum in Taganrog, Russia, originally the home of the wealthy merchant Nikolay Alferaki. It was built in 1848 by the architect Andrei Stackenschneider on Frunze Street (formerly Katolicheskaya), in downtown Taganrog.

== History ==
The first owners of the palace were Nikos Alferakis, who was born in Taganrog, and his family. In the 1870s, after the Alferaki family went bankrupt, the palace was sold to the Greek merchant Negroponte. Its garden was sold to the merchant community. It re-opened as the Commercial Assembly. Anton Chekhov (as a student of The Boys Gymnasium) mentioned the palace in his stories Ionych, Mask and My life. From February to April 1918, the mansion became the headquarters of the Soviet Workers' council of Taganrog.

Later during occupation in 1918 it housed the German war hospital, and in 1919 – Anton Ivanovich Denikin's staff.

After the establishment of Soviet power in Taganrog, after 1927 it housed the Museum of Regional Studies.

During the Occupation of Taganrog, the whole collection of Russian art, as well as 339 other art objects were looted by German occupation authorities

Alferaki Palace was renovated in 1991–1996 and is now open to public as the Museum of Regional Studies, though it is more commonly known under the name Alferaki Palace.

== Views of the palace ==
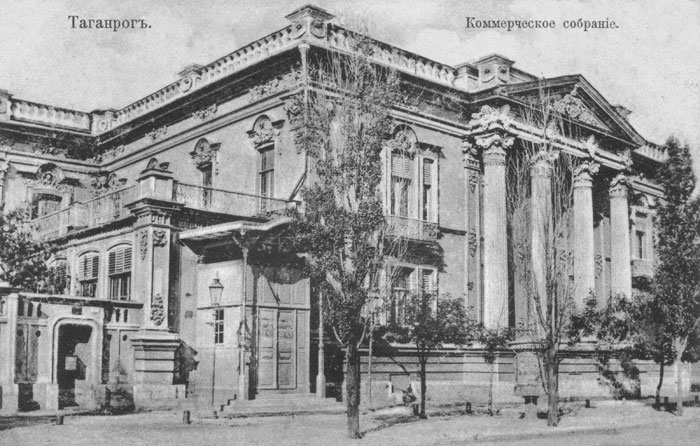
Commercial Assembly in the former Alferaki's mansion, early 20th century

Photo of the late 19th century.

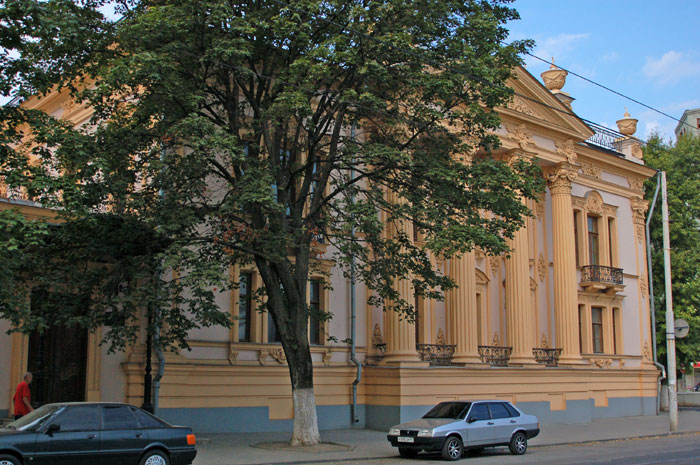
Photo taken in 2006.

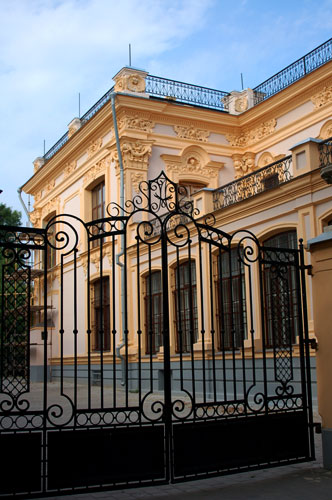
Gates into the Alferaki Palace yard (from Ulitsa Frunze), photo taken in 2006.

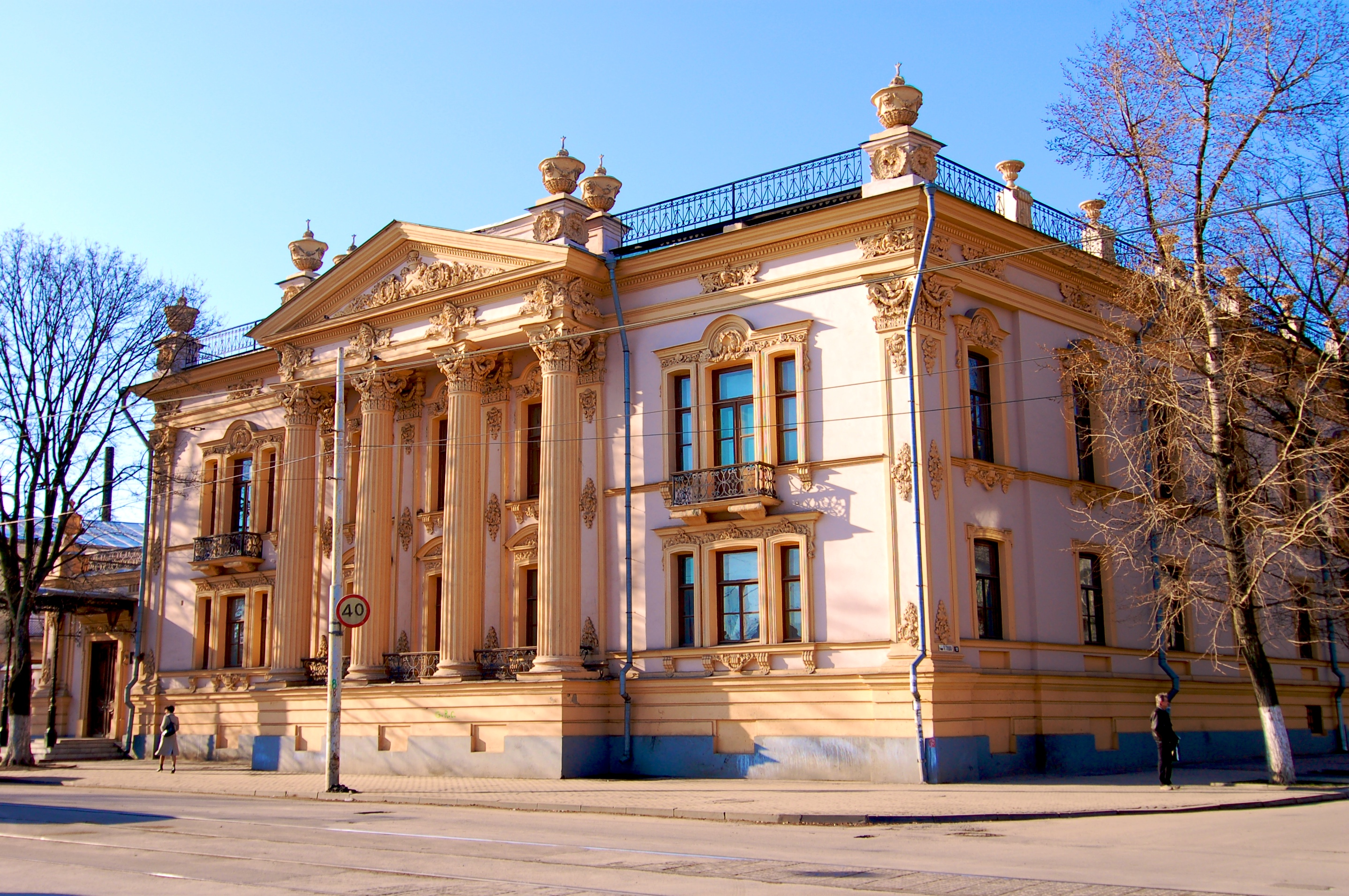
Photo taken in 2008.

== Museum's collection ==
The basis of museum collections is formed with funds related to historical or artistic personalities.

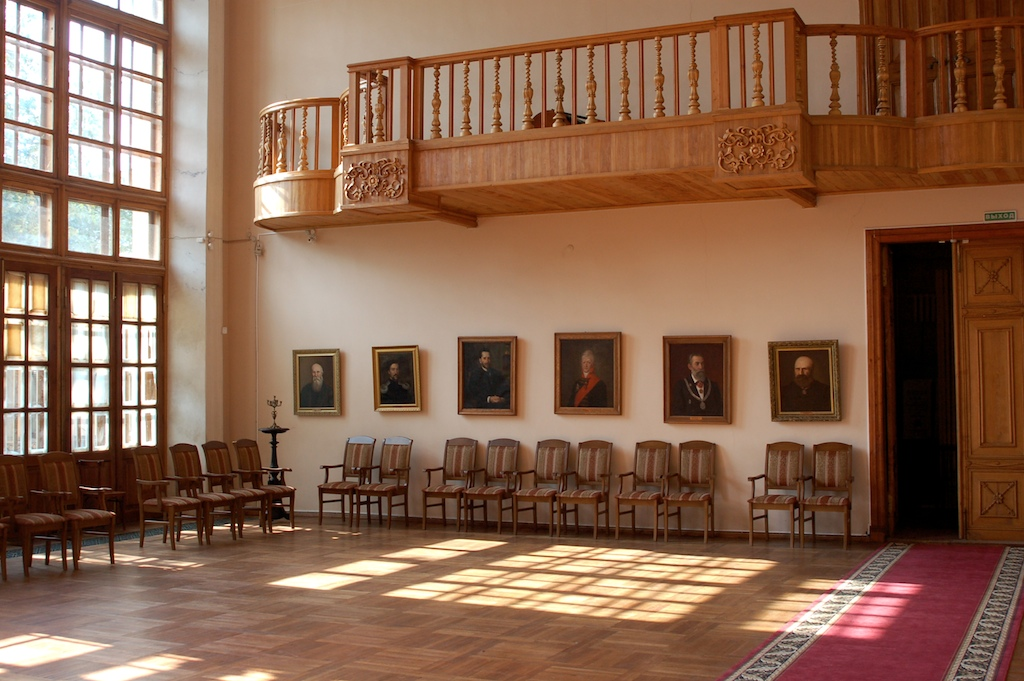
The stateroom (assembly hall) at the Alferaki Palace with portraits of governors and mayors of Taganrog of 19th century.

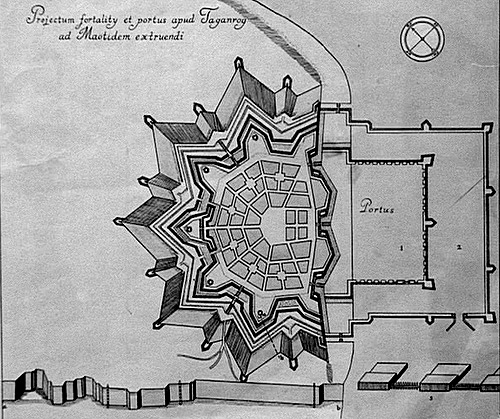
The project of the Saint Trinity fortress and seaport of Taganrog (established by Austrian engineer Baron Ernst Friedrich von Borgsdorf).

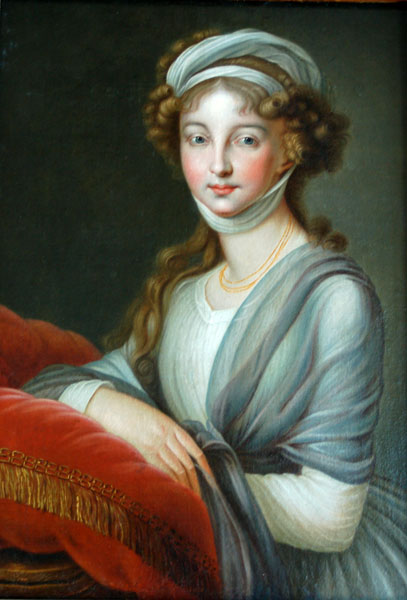
Portrait of Yelizaveta Alexeevna (fragment, slightly cropped), born Louise of Baden, spouse of Alexander I of Russia.

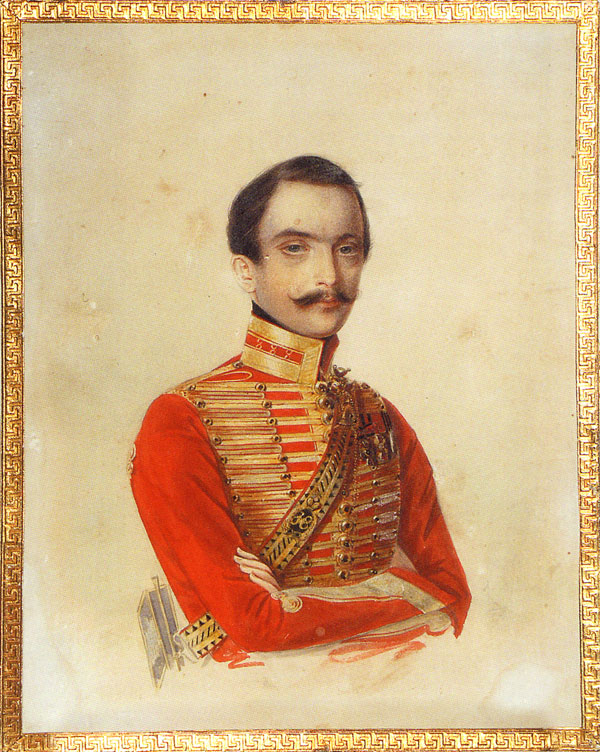
Portrait of Mayor-General Alexandre Remi, friend of Mikhail Lermontov

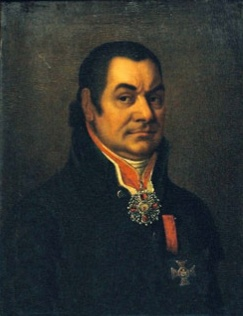
Portrait of Ioannis Varvakis attributed to Vladimir Borovikovsky

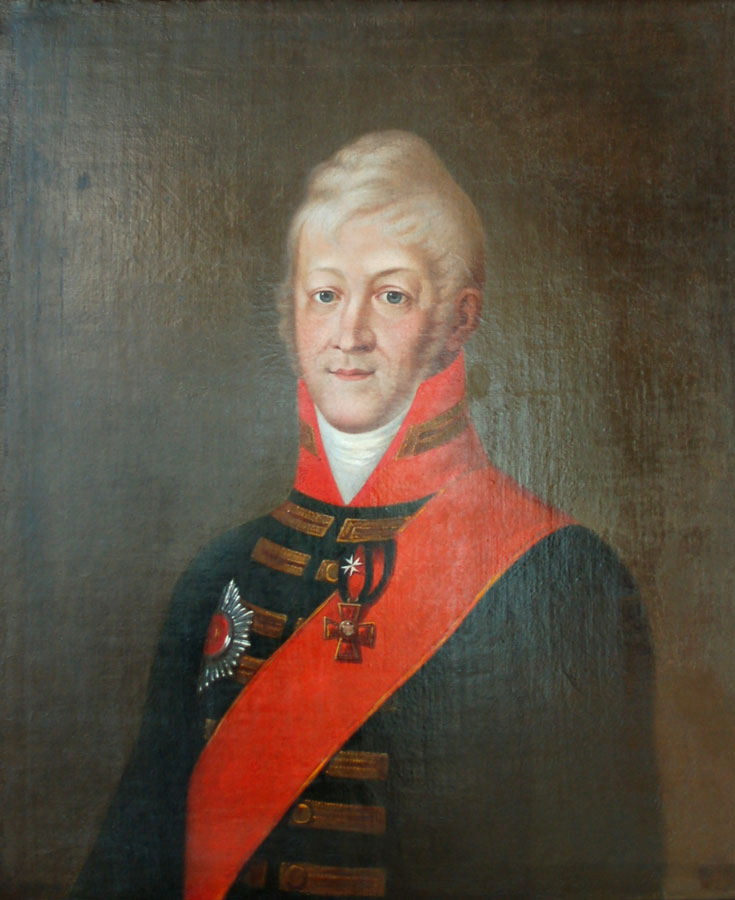
Governor Balthasar von Campenhausen

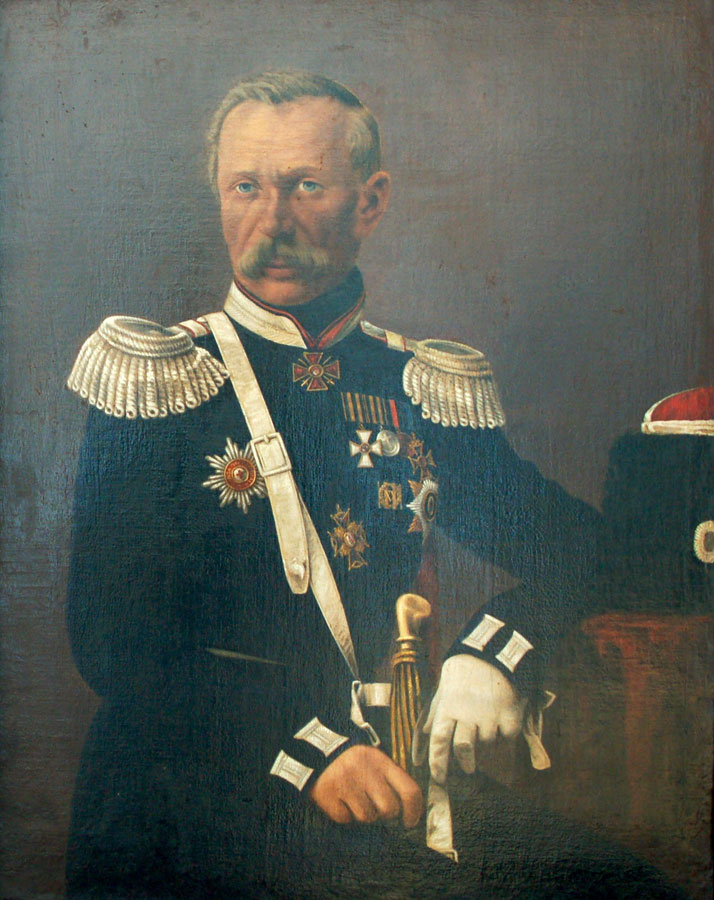
General Ivan Krasnov.

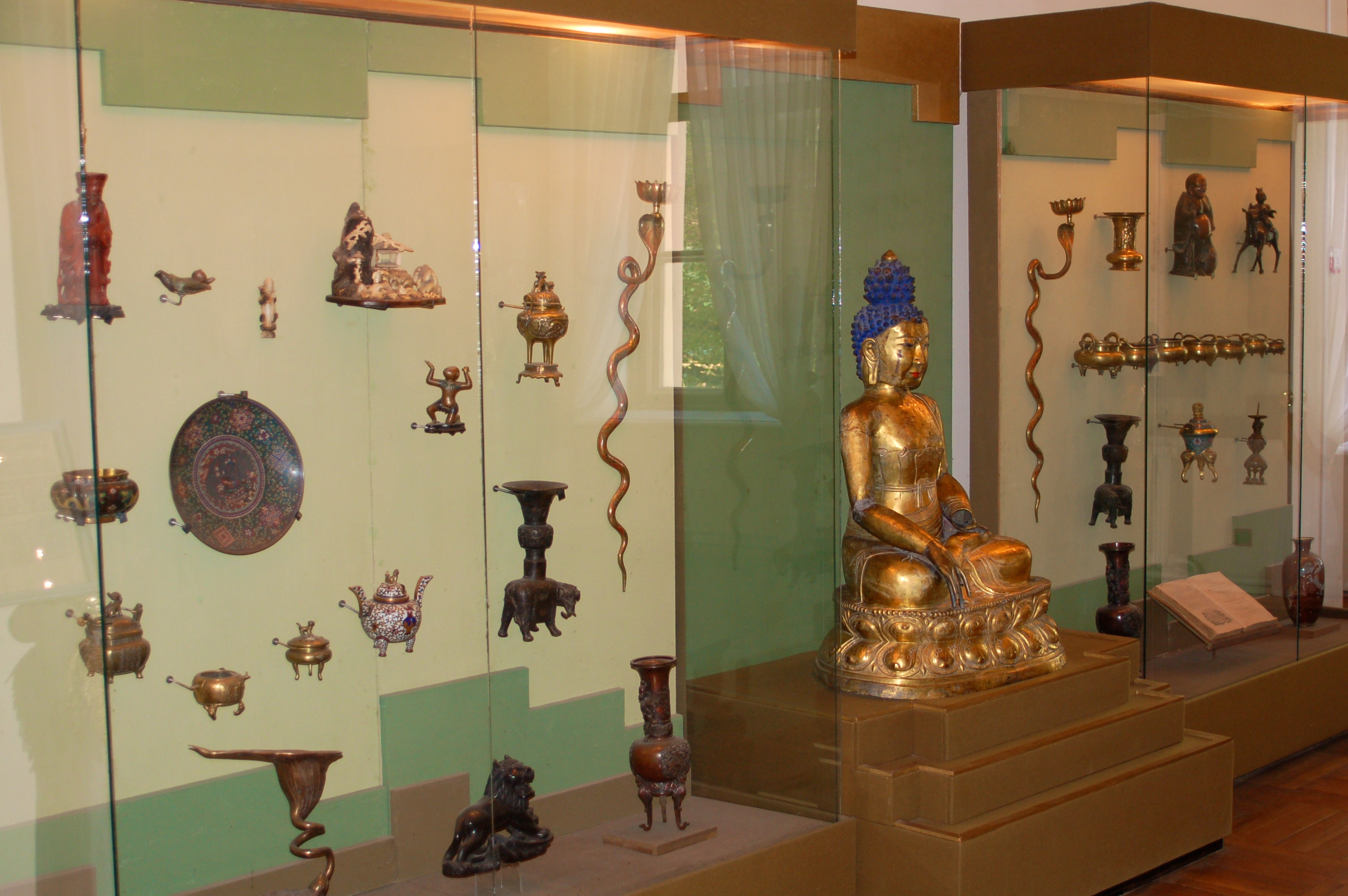
Lootings of general Paul von Rennenkampf.

== See also ==
- Achilles Alferaki
- Sergei Alphéraky
- History of Taganrog
- List of people in Taganrog
