= Samuel Maykapar =

Russian composer (1867–1938)

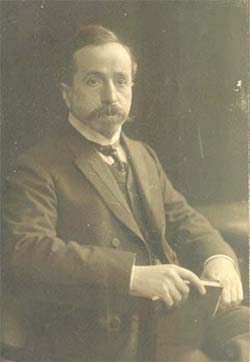
Samuel Maykapar

Samuel Moiseyevich Maykapar (Russian: Самуил Моисеевич Майкапар) (18 December 1867 – 8 May 1938) was a Russian romantic composer, pianist, professor of music at the St. Petersburg Conservatory, and author of a number of piano practice pieces.

== Life ==
=== Childhood ===
Samuel Maykapar was born on 18 December 1867 in the city of Kherson, to Karaite parents. Maykapar spent his childhood in the city of Taganrog and in 1885 he graduated from the Boys Gymnasium where he studied with Anton Chekhov. He also took private music lessons from Gaetano Molla, director of the Italian Opera in Taganrog.

=== Education ===
In 1885, he enrolled into St. Petersburg Conservatory while also studying law at Saint Petersburg University, graduating in 1891. A pupil of Beniamino Cesi and Nicolai Soloviev, Maykapar received the St. Petersburg Conservatory's diploma in 1893 and further improved his piano skills under the direction of Theodor Leschetizky until 1898. During this time he gave numerous concerts in Berlin, Leipzig, Saint Petersburg, Moscow, Taganrog and other cities.

=== Career ===
Between 1898 and 1901, he gave concerts with Leopold Auer in Saint Petersburg and Ivan Grzhimali in Moscow. In 1901, he founded his own music school in the city of Tver. From 1903-1910, he lived in Moscow and toured Germany giving concerts. Maykapar was an active participant and the Secretary of Sergei Taneyev's Scientific-Musical Circle in Moscow. In 1915 he became professor of music at the St. Petersburg Conservatory. In 1927, over seven consecutive nights, the composer performed all 32 Beethoven sonatas in the Small Hall of the Conservatory as part of the Beethoven Centennial Celebrations.

He composed over three hundred pieces of music and wrote several scientific works.

His autobiography, The Years of Study and of Musical Activity, was published in Moscow in 1938. In it, he looks back at his childhood and education in Taganrog.

Samuel Maykapar died in Leningrad on 8 May 1938.

== Musical works ==
Samuel Maykapar's compositions include Biriulki (a suite of 26 pieces), Novelettes mignonnes, 24 Miniatures, The Marionette Theater (an album of seven pieces), two sonatas, piano studies, and special exercises for pedaling.
