= Aquanauts (film) =

- Directed by: Igor Vosnesensky
- Written by: Sergei Pavlov; Igor Vosnesensky
- Starring: German Poloskov; Alexander Yakovlev; Irene Azer
- Cinematography: Aleksander Filatov; Georgiy Zelenin
- Edited by: G. Dmitriyeva
- Music by: Yevgeny Krylatov
- Production company: Gorky Film Studio
- Release dates: 11 October 1980 (Soviet Union); 22 May 1981 (East Germany)
- Running time: 80 minutes
- Country: Soviet Union
- Language: Russian

Aquanauts (Russian: Акванавты, romanized: Akvanavty) is a 1980 Soviet science fiction film directed by Igor Vosnesensky, based on the story of the same name by Sergei Pavlov.

== Plot ==
In the Indian Ocean the Deuterium 1010 station for the extraction of heavy water is located - fuel for nuclear power plants that provide energy to the west coast. Service staff includes two aquanauts, "human fish".

Once the serving vessel "King Viking Sky" picks up a surfaced rescue mesoscaphe with only one aquanaut, Jacques Dumont, who suffers a severe nervous breakdown; the second, Vilem Pasic, stayed at the bottom and, most likely, died. The deuterium production is stopped. It is necessary urgently to start the work of the station and find out what happened at a depth of 1010 meters. The third hydrocombist of the same expedition, Sven Ball, and Igor Sobolev from the research vessel Taimyr, go down where they encounter a strange intelligent giant oceanic manta ray.

The key to the mystery of the manta ray's intelligence lies in the story of the accidental copying of the matrix of consciousness into its brain by Professor Kerom. The matrix was copied from the brain of the professor's daughter, Lotta, who was Sobolev's bride, but died in a car accident. An unmanned aircraft carrying consciousness matrixes and an apparatus for copying, crashed over the ocean. In the wreckage of the airplane, the pup of the manta swam and came to be in the automatic copy machine.

== Cast ==
- German Poloskov - Igor Sobolev
- Alexander Yakovlev - Sven Boll
- Irene Azer - Lotta Kerom
- Vatslav Dvorzhetsky - Professor Kerom
- Pauls Butkēvičs - Dugovsky
- Arnis Līcītis - Dumont
- Elena Valaeva - Natasha
- Nikolai Kryukov - Commander
- Yuri Sarantsev - Selivanov
- Artem Karapetyan - Agimoglyan
- Vladimir Nikitin - Andrei
- Alvydas Schulchis - Janek
- Regīna Razuma - Ellen
- Gennady Petrov - Vasilyev

== Production ==
The film contains a large number of underwater scenes, which required careful preparation and organization. All of them were shot in the region of the southern coast of Cape Tarkhankut in the Crimea. Set design of the Deuterium-1010 submarine station was created in three stages: first the bearing part was made in the nearest port, then the station's compartments were built on the Yalta film studio. The final assembly and finishing took place in the port, where the decoration was loaded onto the Skif crane, which delivered the construction to Maly Atlesh Bay selected as the main film set. The role of the "Sunken Airplane" decoration object was played by a military board, which had been used up, before being dumped from the cliff and pulled by a winch under the arch of the natural tunnel.

The mechanical manta doll, made at the film studio, was based on a metal frame, to which were attached five lever elements, controlling the "wings". The total length was 3.5 metres (11 ft), and the wingspan reached 5 metres (16 ft). The weight of the device was 350 kilograms (770 lb). The design was driven by a sealed DC motor, powered by a cable disguised in the tail. To simulate the elastic skin, the metal frame was covered with rubber bands, which were covered with foam rubber and napless on top. The foam blocks installed inside gave neutral buoyancy, creating the illusion of "hovering" of the manta under the water.

The main part of the underwater episodes was shot from a specially built underwater habitable module with portholes providing a circular view. The room for the cameraman, supplied with compressed air through a hose, was designed for a working depth of up to 12 metres (39 ft), excluding the decompression procedure after each ascent. The module could be installed by the base ship in different places and later used for underwater shooting in other films.

== See also ==
- The Aquanauts — 1960s American adventure series
