= Leonid Gobyato =

Russian general (1875–1915)

Leonid Nikolaevich Gobyato
- Leonid Gobyato in 1916
- Native name: Леонид Николаевич Гобято
- Born: 6 February 1875; Taganrog, Russian Empire
- Died: 21 May 1915 (aged 40) Przemyśl, Austria-Hungary
- Allegiance: Russian Empire
- Branch: Imperial Russian Army
- Service years: 1876–1915
- Rank: Lieutenant General
- Conflicts: Russo Japanese War; World War I †
- Awards: Order of St. George

Leonid Nikolaevich Gobyato (Russian: Леонид Николаевич Гобято; 6 February 1875 – 21 May 1915) was a lieutenant-general (awarded posthumously in 1915) in the Imperial Russian Army and designer of the modern, man-portable mortar.

== Life and career ==
Gobyato was born in the city of Taganrog into the noble family of Gobyato. His father, Nikolai Konstantinovich Gobyato, was a gentleman by birth, member of the Taganrog County Court and alderman at the Taganrog City Council (Duma). Gobyato graduated from the Chekhov Gymnasium in Taganrog, afterwards studying at the Cadets Corps in Moscow and in 1893, was recommended as one of the best student to the Mikhailovskoe Artillery School from which he graduated in 1896. He then attended the Mikhailovskoe Artillery Academy, from which he graduated in 1902.

In May 1902, Gobyato returned to the home city of Taganrog, where in 1903 he submitted his first work Instructions on Use of Deflection in Batteries Equipped with 3-inch Rapid-Firing Guns of 1902, written in cooperation with Colonel Demidov.

After the outbreak of the Russo-Japanese War of 1904–1905, both Leonid and his brother Nikolai were participating in the events. Nikolai served on the Russian Navy's cruiser Gromoboi based with the Russian Pacific Fleet at Vladivostok, while Leonid, with the rank of captain, was a battery commander in the 4th East Siberian Rifle Artillery Brigade based at Port Arthur. At the Battle of Jinzhou, Leonid Gobyato, together with General Roman Kondratenko, for the first time applied indirect fire from closed firing positions in the field using a protractor. In July 1904, he was seriously wounded in the thigh in combat, and was assigned to be assistant chief of artillery of the Port Arthur fortress. During the Siege of Port Arthur, the fighting revealed the need for a weapon to attack the Japanese in closely spaced trenches, gullies and ravines. Together with Russian navy midshipman S. Vlasov, he modified small naval mines with stabilizers be fired from a wheeled 47-mm naval mortar. For services in the defense of Port Arthur was awarded five medals (among them the Order of St. George (4th degree) and the Golden Sword "for courage". After the surrender of the garrison of Port Arthur on January 2, 1905, Gobyato was made a prisoner of war.

After his return from captivity in May 1906, Gobyato was promoted and published an article on his first mortar ("Fighting the principles and rules of Field Artillery"). In early 1908, he graduated from Officer's Artillery School and in September of the same year was assigned to command the 3rd Battery of the 3rd Artillery Brigade. He also served as a lecturer on artillery science at the General Staff Academy from 1908 to 1914.

After the outbreak of World War I, Gobyato was made commander of 32nd Artillery Brigade, followed by the 35th Artillery Brigade. He was promoted to major general on August 14, 1914. However, while leading an infantry counter-attack at the Siege of Przemyśl in what is now part of Poland, he was killed in combat on May 21, 1915. His grave is at the Gobyato family estate outside of Ryazan.

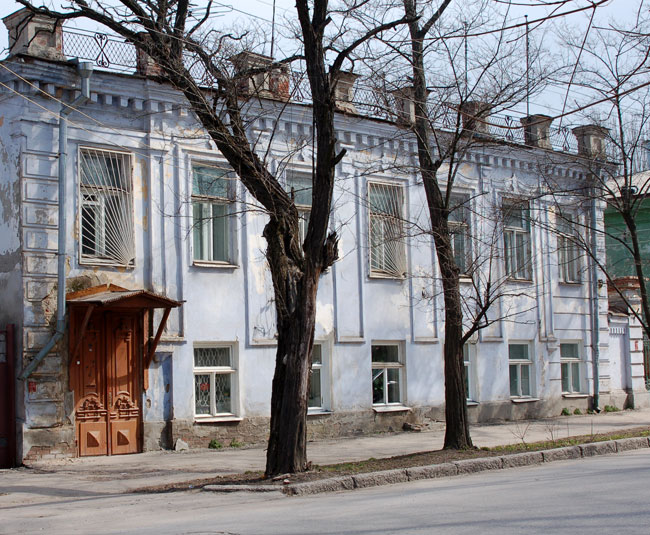
Birth house of Gobyato in Taganrog.

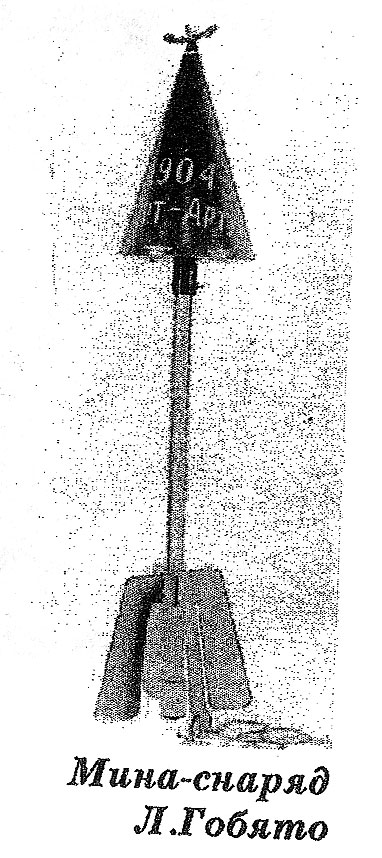
A shell for the Gobyato's mortar, 1904

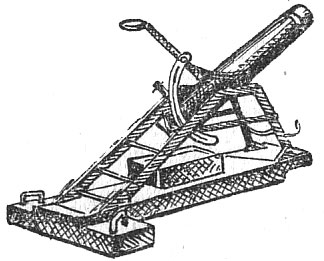
Gobyato's mortar, 1904

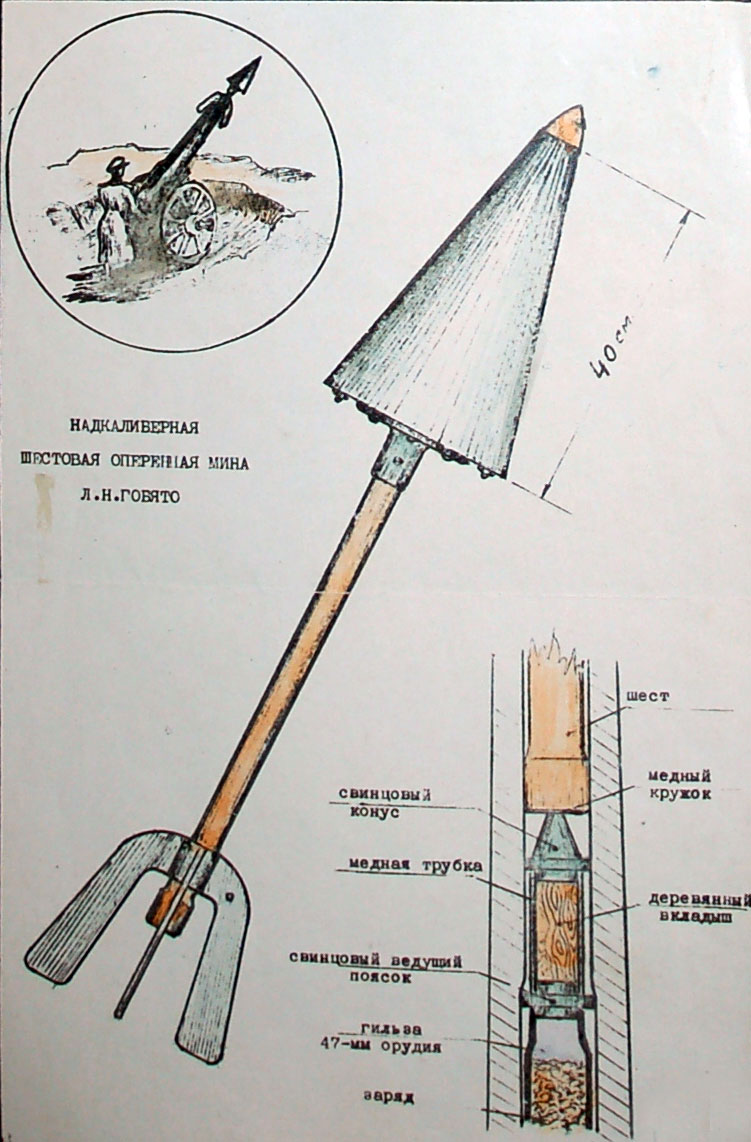
The scheme of the shell for the Gobyato's mortar (from the Alferaki Palace in Taganrog)

== See also ==
- List of Russian inventors
