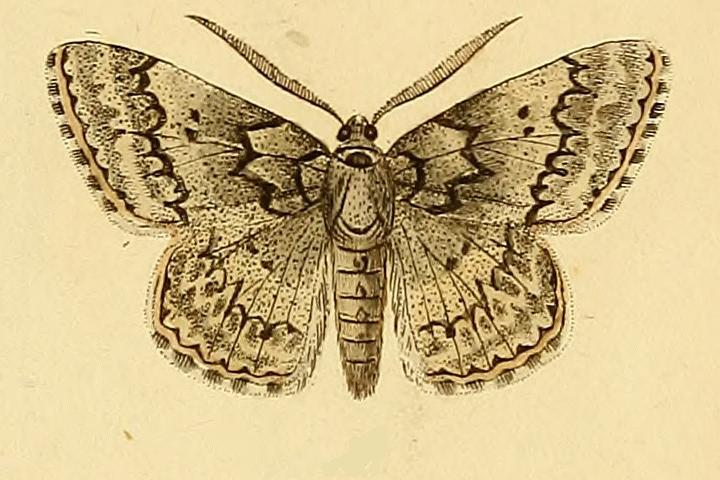

Scientific classification
- Kingdom: Animalia
- Phylum: Arthropoda
- Class: Insecta
- Order: Lepidoptera
- Family: Geometridae
- Genus: Pseudoterpna
- Species: P. corsicaria

Binomial name
- Pseudoterpna corsicaria (Rambur, 1833)

Synonyms
- Hemithea corsicaria Rambur, 1833; Pseudoterpna corsicaria ramburaria Oberthür, 1916

= Pseudoterpna corsicaria =

Species of moth

Pseudoterpna corsicaria is a moth of the family Geometridae first described by Jules Pierre Rambur in 1833. It is found on Corsica and Sardinia.

The wingspan is 28–29 mm.
