= Vatslav Dvorzhetsky =

Soviet and Russian actor

- Born: Vatslav Yanovich Dvorzhetsky; August 3 [O.S. July 21] 1910; Kiev, Russian Empire
- Died: April 11, 1993 (aged 82); Nizhny Novgorod, Russia
- Occupation: actor
- Years active: 1927–1993
- Spouses: Taissia Ray (m. 1938; div. 1949) Riva Levitte (m. 1950–1994)
- Children: Vladislav (1939–1978); Evgeniy (1960–1999)

Vatslav Yanovich Dvorzhetsky (Russian: Ва́цлав Я́нович Дворже́цкий; Polish: Wacław Dworzecki) August 3 [O.S. July 21] 1910 – April 11, 1993) was a Soviet film and theater actor. People's Artist of the RSFSR (1991).

== Biography ==
Vatslav Dvorzhetsky born August 3 [O.S. July 21] 1910 to a family of Polish nobility. He studied at drama school at the Kiev Polish Drama Theatre (1927–1929), the Kyiv Polytechnic Institute (1928–1930).

In his free time, he attended classes in Polish theater. In 1929 he was arrested for active participation in the circle of the group identity and release from 1929 to 1937, held in the camps. However, after working shifts Vaclav went not rest, and went to the camp theater Tulomskaya theatrical expedition. And there he made his debut as a theater actor.

After his release in 1937 Dvorzhetsky went to Kiev, to the parents. However, working in the theater there could not be - it never took. He tried to settle in the city theater in Bila Tserkva, But also there is the director did not dare to take on the work of the former political prisoner. Then Dvorzhetsky found work at a workshop in Baryshivka, but a month later he had to get away from there. He moved to Kharkov, where he managed on the recommendation of the chief of the department of culture to get to the farm workers' theater №4. Work out where he was destined to a month. While Vatslav Yanovich theater went on tour in Ukraine (Kupyansk, Debaltsevo, Donetsk), was arrested by the chief of the department of culture, it recommended. I had to leave quickly and from there - first in Moscow, on the Precepts of Ilyich station, where the cousin lived. Not pausing there, Vatslav Yanovich had gone to Omsk, where he was admitted to the local Youth Theatre.

In Omsk he met dancer Taisa Ray. They married and a year later they had a son Vladislav Dvorzhetsky. Before the war, Vaclav Yanovich has worked as an actor and director in Omsk Youth Theatre, Taganrog Theater and the Omsk Oblast Drama theater. In the autumn of 1941 he was again arrested and was in prison until 1946. In the camp he met a civilian employee, and was born girl who was named Tatiana (1946–1995). After the liberation Dvorzhetsky returned to Omsk, but his wife did not forgive him of infidelity and divorced him. Working in the Omsk Drama Theater, Vatslav Yanovich met a young graduate of the Directing Department GITIS Riva Leviticus. In early 1950, they were married and a few years later moved to Saratov, where he got a job in a local drama theater, then moved to Gorky, where in 1960 they had a son Evgeny Dvorzhetsky and Vatslav Yanovich became one of the leading actors of the Drama theater, where he served until his death.

Throughout his life, and even in prison Vátslav Dvorzhetsky always worked in the theater. During his long life he has played 122 roles in 111 performances. In 1978–1980 years - an actor of the theater Sovremennik, in 1988 the actor of the Gorky Drama Theater.

Since 1968, also starred in the film and television.

In recent years, seriously ill, he began to deteriorate eyesight, but he still continued to work actively on the stage and in film. He had to learn the role of listening, to overcome many difficulties to remain in their favorite occupation to end.

in his book Dvorzhetsky wrote: My Destiny Seems to Me to Be Extremely Well Developed.

== Death ==
He died after surgery April 11, 1993. Buried in Nizhny Novgorod (Bugrovskoye Cemetery).

== Selected filmography ==
- The Shield and the Sword (1968) as Lansdorf
- Far to the west (1968) as Jurgens
- Love of Serafim Frolov (1968) as peasant
- Ugryum river (1968) as Yashka
- The person in the thoroughfare (1971) as Kyrgemaa
- Burning Daylight (1975) as Charles
- Guarneri Quartet (1976) as Butorin
- Red and Black (1976) as Abbe Chelan
- Pugachev (1978) as Filaret
- Father Sergius (1978) as director of the cadet corps
- Aquanauts (1979) as Professor Kerom
- Teheran 43 (1980) as passenger aircraft
- Per Aspera Ad Astra as Petr Petrovich
- Mother Mary (1983) as Boris Nicolaevsky
- TASS Is Authorized to Declare... (1984) as Professor Winter
- Dead Man's Letters (1986) as Pastor
- Flight to the country monsters (1986) as teacher
- Forgotten Melody for a Flute (1987) as Leonid Filimonov's father'
- Oldest of Serafima Glyukina (1988) as Yuri Ivanovich
- Defence Counsel Sedov (1988)
- How Dark the Nights Are on the Black Sea (1989) as Fedor Fedorovich Strelnikov
- White clothes (1992) as Professor Heifetz
- Split (1993) as Julius Martov
