= Young Russia (youth movement) =

Youth movement Young Russia Молодежное движение Россия Молодая
- Formation: April 2005
- Dissolved: 2017
- Type: Political youth movement
- Headquarters: Moscow
- Location(s): Ulitsa Ladozhskaya 11/6 ул. Ладожская, 11/6
- Region served: nationwide
- Members: private persons
- Official language: Russian
- leader of the movement: Maksim Mishenko
- Website: www.rumol.ru

Young Russia was a Russian youth movement founded in April 2005. The movement was known for its protest rallies in front of foreign embassies and for various political rallies in the streets. It was dismantled in 2017.

The organization was founded in April 2005 by a group of students and post-graduate students of the Bauman Moscow State Technical University. The manifesto of the movement stipulates that their main activity will be directed against "Western expansion, terrorism and corruption".

In March 2009 leader of the movement Maksim Mishenko declared that the movement would rather focus in other directions: among others - the fight against the religious sect of scientologists and against illegal sales of alcohol to minors. According to Mishenko, after presidential elections the main enemy diminished its influence, and the United States of America will no longer try to use "Orange revolution technologies" to interfere in the internal affairs of our country. We need to prepare for a peaceful life and refocus our resources.
