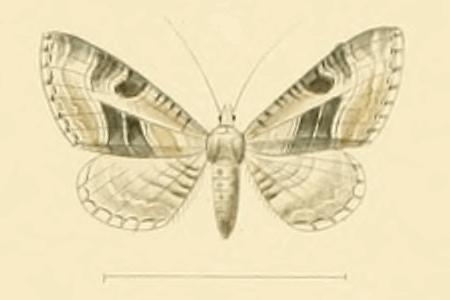

Scientific classification
- Domain: Eukaryota
- Kingdom: Animalia
- Phylum: Arthropoda
- Class: Insecta
- Order: Lepidoptera
- Family: Geometridae
- Genus: Eupithecia
- Species: E. scalptata

Binomial name
- Eupithecia scalptata Christoph, 1885

= Eupithecia scalptata =

Species of moth

Eupithecia scalptata is a moth in the family Geometridae first described by Hugo Theodor Christoph in 1885. It is found from Albania and Greece to the Lower Volga region (the Volgograd oblast in Russia) in the north-east and Turkmenistan and Iran in the south-east.
