= Vatslav Mikhalsky =

Soviet-Russian writer (1938–2024)

- Вацлав Вацлавович Михальский
- Born: 27 June 1938; Taganrog, Russian SFSR, USSR
- Died: 5 April 2024 (aged 85)
- Education: Maxim Gorky Literature Institute
- Occupations: Writer, screenwriter, editor

Vatslav Vatslavovich Mikhalsky (Russian: Вацлав Вацлавович Михальский; Polish: Waclaw Michalski; 27 June 1938 – 5 April 2024) was a Soviet and Russian writer, screenwriter and editor.

== Life and career ==
Mikhalsky was born in the city of Taganrog in North Caucausis region of Russia on 27 June 1938. His mother was Russian, and his father was Polish- a descendant of a Poland-born military officer, who served in the Russian imperial Army in mid-1800's, and who was killed in Caucasian War. Vaclav's father was arrested during Stalin's purges, after that the rest of the family moved into Dagestan, and later into Kabardino-Balkaria and into Chechnya-Ingushetia autonomous regions of Russia in the North Caucasis.

In 1965 Vaclav graduated from Maxim Gorky Literature Institute in Moscow, Russia, and in 1975 from graduate-level movie-script writing courses at Goskino Academy.

Vaclav wrote numerous prose pieces and movie scripts. In 1990 he founded magazine "Solgasie" (Concordance), and later became the Director General and the Chief Editor of the whole publishing house.

Mikhalsky died on 5 April 2024, at the age of 85.

== Awards ==
- State Prize of the Russian Federation of 2002 for his novel The Spring in Carthage.

== Novels ==
- «Баллада о старом оружии» (1964)
- «Катенька» (1965)
- «Семнадцать левых сапог» (1967)
- «Тайные милости» (1982)

cycle of novels dedicated to the first wave of Russian immigration:

  - «The Spring in Carthage» (2001)
  - «Одинокому везде пустыня» (2003)
  - «Для радости нужны двое» (2006)
  - «Храм согласия» (2008)
  - «Прощеное воскресенье» (2009).

== Screenplays ==
1. Za chto? (1991) (novel "Semnadtsat levykh sapog") (screenplay)

... a.k.a. Why? (International: English title) ... a.k.a. Semnadtsat levykh sapog (Russia)

1. Katenka (1987) (writer)

... a.k.a. Катенька (Soviet Union: Russian title)

1. Ballada o starom oruzhii (1986) (book) (screenplay)
