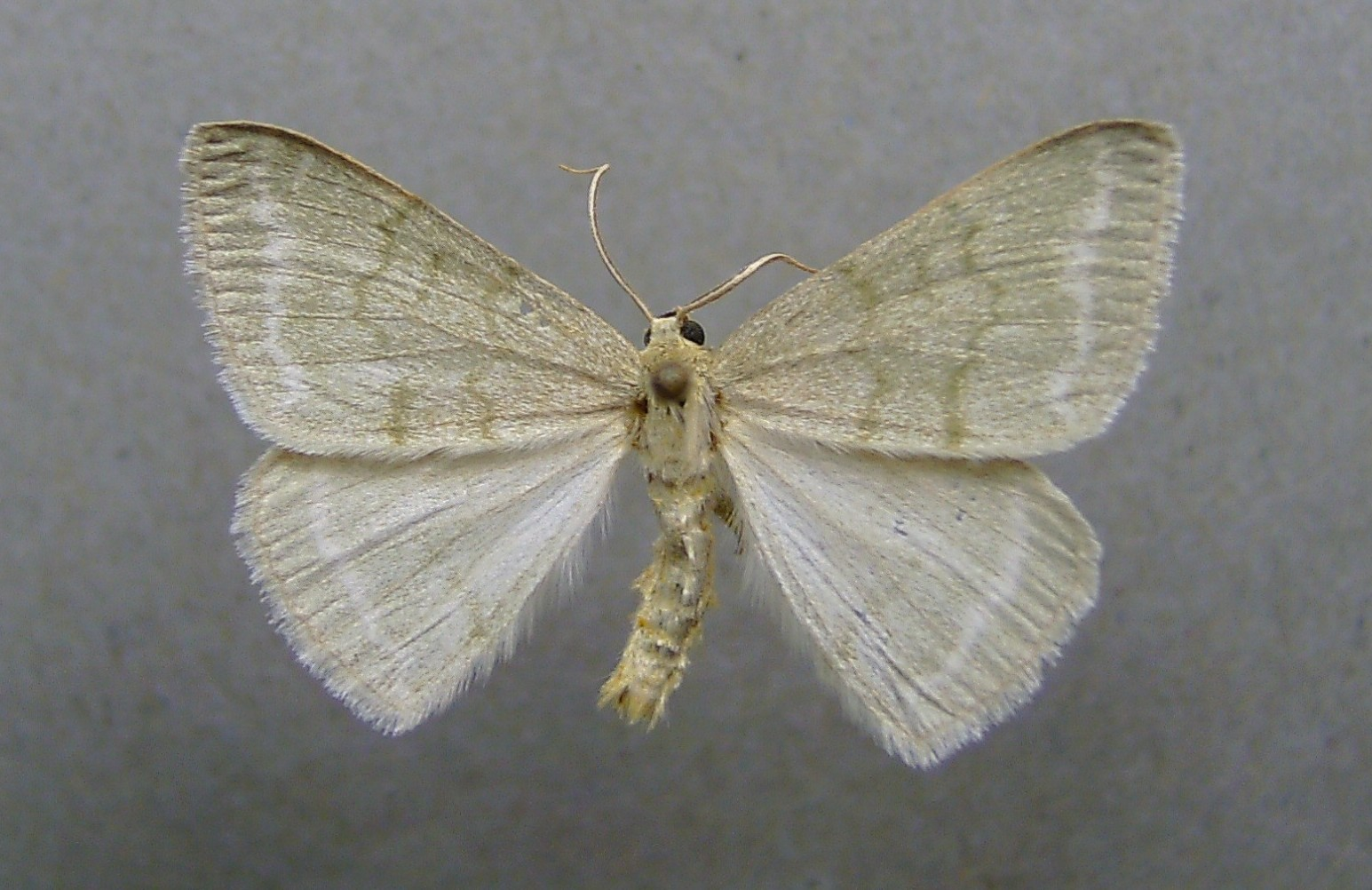

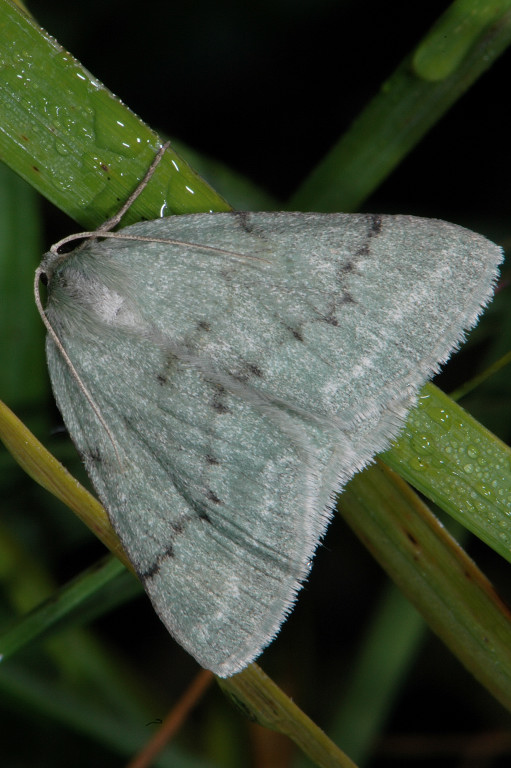

Scientific classification
- Domain: Eukaryota
- Kingdom: Animalia
- Phylum: Arthropoda
- Class: Insecta
- Order: Lepidoptera
- Family: Geometridae
- Genus: Pseudoterpna
- Species: P. pruinata

Binomial name
- Pseudoterpna pruinata (Hufnagel, 1767)

Synonyms
- Phalaena pruinata Hufnagel, 1767; Geometra cythisaria Denis & Schiffermüller, 1775; Phalaena pruinaria Rottemburg, 1777; Phalaena (Geometra) genistaria Villers, 1789; Hemithea agrestaria Duponchel, 1829; Hemithea porracearia Boisduval, 1840; Phalaena (Geometra) viridisparsata Roquette, 1857; Aspilates atropunctaria Walker, [1863]; Pseudoterpna pruinata ab. grisescens Reutti, 1898; Pseudoterpna pruinata var. virellata Krulikovsky, 1908; Pseudoterpna pruinata f. nigrolineata Schwingenschuss, 1918; Pseudoterpna pruinata f. candidata Stauder, 1920; Pseudoterpna pruinata var. holsatica Wagner, 1922; Pseudoterpna prinata ab. syltica Prout, 1934; Phalaena prasinaria Fabricius, 1775

= Grass emerald =

Species of moth

The grass emerald (Pseudoterpna pruinata) is a species of moth. It occurs throughout central and south-eastern Europe (with the exception of the far north) and in Asia Minor and the Caucasus further east to the Urals and Siberia. It is fairly common throughout Great Britain with the exception of northern Scotland. In the southern Alps, it rises up to 1500 metres. The species was first described by Johann Siegfried Hufnagel in 1767.

== Description ==
The wingspan is 30–35 mm. It is green, sometimes more, sometimes less bluish, mixed with whitish, the forewing with two, the hindwing with one dark green transverse line, varying in intensity and in exact position; submarginal line thick, whitish. The variation agrestaria Duponchel is nearly unicolorous, the dark lines being entirely effaced. It possibly tends to form a local race in some places (as southern France) but certainly occurs in others together with the type. The variation virellata Krulikovsky, from eastern Russia, perhaps truly a local race, would appear, from its author's description, to be closely similar to the last-named form, but larger and probably darker, less mixed with white. As fasciata ab. nov. [Prout] may be described as a handsome form of occasional occurrence (at least in Britain) with the lines of forewing somewhat approximated and the area between them considerably darker than the ground colour.

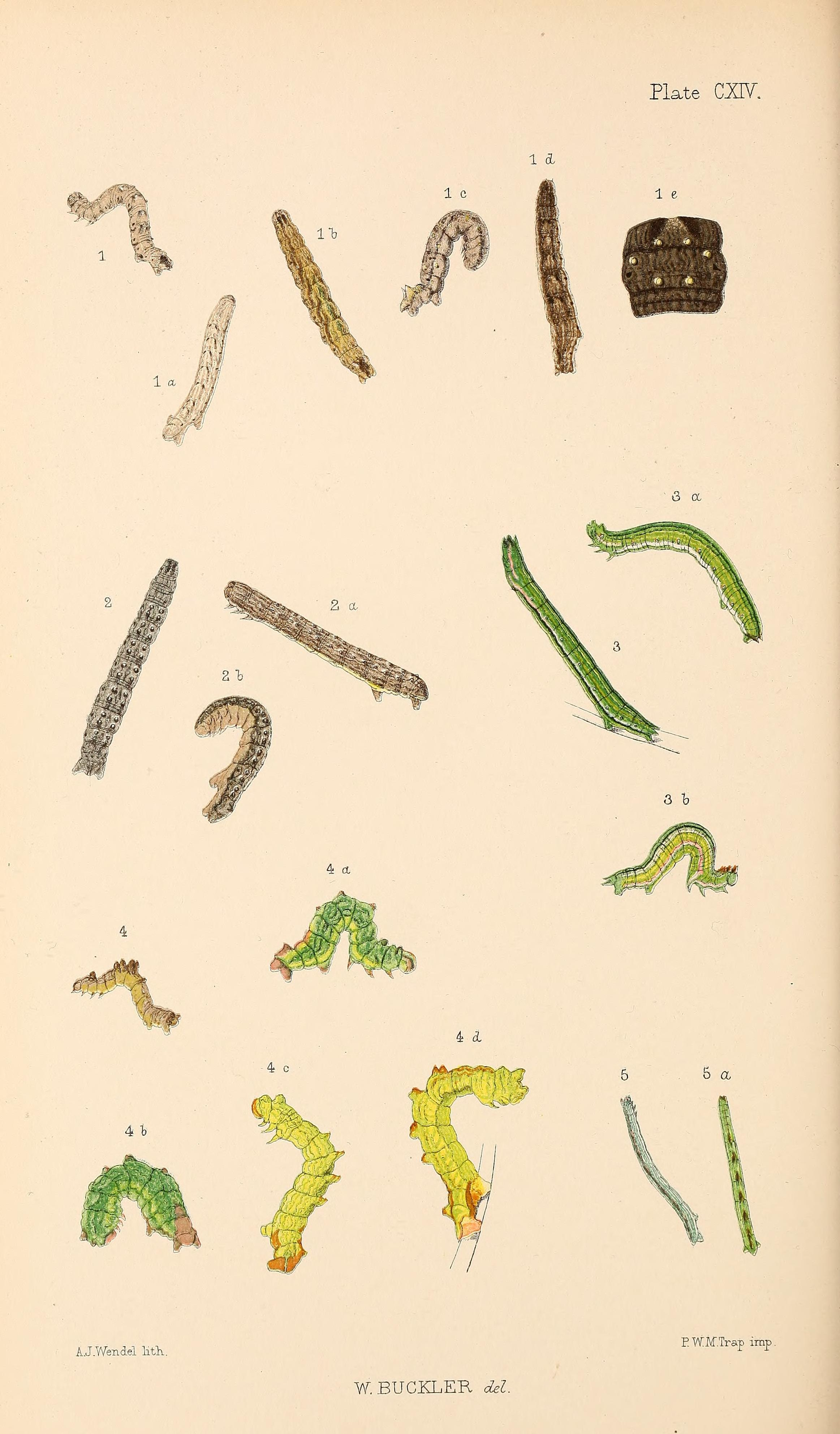
Fig 3,3a,3b,1c,1d Larva after final moult

The larva is stout, tapering anteriorly; head deeply bifid, the divisions pointed; prothorax produced to two points anteriorly, body nearly cylindrical, with slight lateral flange, surface strongly granulated with whitish; green with white subdorsal lines, pink lateral line and usually tipped with pink on the points of head and prothorax and at anus; tubercles and setae dark, but minute.

Pupa of moderate width, tapering anteriorly; light brown, clay coloured or greenish, irregularly dark spotted, supraanal plate long. Rests in a very slight cocoon formed of a few threads among leaves.

== Biology ==
It can be found in such habitats as heathland, moorland, and commons, where its larvae feed on broom, gorse and petty whin.

Habitas include mainly dry and warm regions, heath, steppes, semi-dry or dry grassland, stone quarries and forest edges.
