= Alexandre Remi =

- Реми, Александр Гаврилович
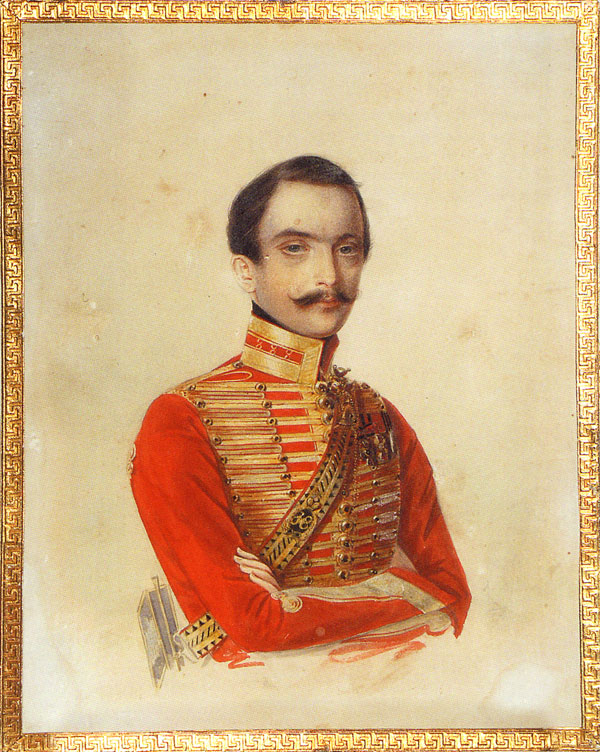
- Alexandre Remi
- Born: August 30, 1809; Saint Petersburg
- Died: September 27, 1871 (aged 62); Novocherkassk
- Relatives: Mikhail Lermontov
- Military career
- Allegiance: Russian
- Branch: Cavalry
- Rank: Mayor-general
- Unit: 1st Bugsk uhlan regiment
- Awards: Order of St. Stanislaus

Alexander Gavrilovich Remy Russian: Реми, Александр Гаврилович (8 August 1809- 27 September 1871) was a Russian mayor-general, brother officer of Russian poet Mikhail Lermontov.

Alexander Remy was born in 1809 in the city of Saint Petersburg into a Russian noble family Remy (family) of Swiss descent. The ancestor of Remy came to Russia in 1787, when the officer Jean-Gabriel Remy entered the Engineering Corps in Saint Petersburg.

Remy began his military service in cavalry in 1826. Until 1835 he served at the 1st Bugsk uhlan regiment, later captain of cavalry at the Uhlan Regiment in Saint Petersburg, brother officer of Mikhail Lermontov. Alexander Remy was appointed officer for special commissions at the headquarters of General Khomutov at Don Cossack Voisko and was promoted to the rank of lieutenant colonel in April, 1840. Remi left for Novocherkassk in May, 1840, meeting in Moscow his friend Mikhail Lermontov who was heading Caucasus for exile. The cigar-case presented to Remy by Lermontov may be viewed at the Tarkhany museum (музей-заповедник «Тарханы»).

Alexander Remy participated in several wars and was decorated with Order of St. Stanislaus of 2nd degree, Order of St. Vladimir of 1st degree (with a ribbon), Order of St. Anna of 3 degree (with ribbon), and a silver medal for courage. On the 25th anniversary of his military service, Remy was awarded with an Order of St. George of 4th degree. In 1868, he was promoted to the rank of mayor-general. After resignation, the general received several lands in Don Voisko Province (one of the villages was later named Removka). Alexander Remy settled in Taganrog, where he acquired several houses, including the mansion of the former Taganrog's governor Pyotr Papkov on Malaya Birzhevaya Ulitsa (now Ulitsa Schmidta). Remy took an active part in the city affairs: he was member of the committee for the construction of Taganrog Theater and of the Charity society. He died in 1871 in a train accident near Novocherkassk.

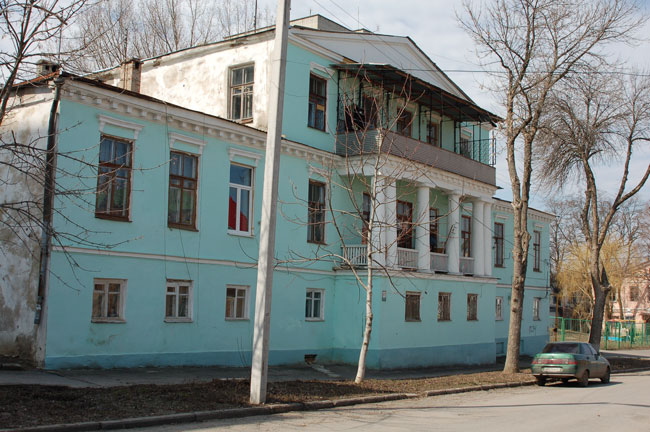
The mansion of Remy (1810) in Taganrog.

The mansion of Alexander Remy housed the newly married couple of Pavel Chekhov and Yevgeniya Chekhova, the parents of Russian writer Anton Chekhov, who rented one of the rooms in 1854–1855. This gave Anton Chekhov the motif for his story "The House with an Attic" in 1896.
