= Anatoli Vanzhula =

Russian footballer

Personal information
- Full name: Anatoli Valeryevich Vanzhula
- Date of birth: 29 June 1975 (age 51)
- Place of birth: Taganrog, Russian SFSR
- Height: 1.78 m (5 ft 10 in)
- Position: Midfielder

Senior career*
Years	Team	Apps	(Gls)
1994–1996	Torpedo Taganrog	96	(11)
1997–1998	Sokol Saratov	31	(1)
1998	Metallurg Lipetsk	13	(0)
1999	Chernomorets Novorossiysk	13	(0)
1999	Nosta Novotroitsk	15	(1)
2000	Volga Ulyanovsk	14	(1)
2000	Mangystau	2	(0)
2000–2001	Nosta Novotroitsk	36	(7)
2002–2003	Sodovik Sterlitamak	41	(4)
2004	Torpedo-SKA Minsk	5	(0)
2005	Lada-SOK Dimitrovgrad	33	(2)
2006	Kuzbass-Dynamo Kemerovo	14	(1)
2007	Sakhalin Yuzhno-Sakhalinsk	27	(4)
2008	Kuzbass Kemerovo	13	(0)
2009	Taganrog	19	(0)
- * Club domestic league appearances and goals

Anatoli Valeryevich Vanzhula (Russian: Анатолий Валерьевич Ванжула; born 29 June 1975) is a Russian former professional footballer.

== Club career ==
He made his debut in the Russian Premier League in 1999 for FC Chernomorets Novorossiysk.
