= Maksim Mishchenko =

Russian politician

- Born: July 9, 1977 (age 49); Taganrog, USSR
- Citizenship: Russian Federation
- Education: Bauman Moscow State Technical University
- Political party: United Russia
- Website: www.rumol.ru

Maksim Nikolayevich Mishchenko (Russian: Макси́м Никола́евич Ми́щенко) is a Russian politician, deputy of the State Duma, founder and leader of the youth movement Young Russia.

== Biography ==
Born in the city of Taganrog on July 9, 1977. In 1994 went to Moscow and entered the Bauman Moscow State Technical University, which he graduated in 2000. Since 2005 - leader of the youth movement Young Russia.

In December 2007, he was elected deputy of State Duma at 2007 Russian legislative election from Chelyabinsk Oblast's list of political party United Russia. Member of the State Duma's committee for youth affairs.

On April 23, 2008, he was awarded the Medal of the Order "For Merit to the Fatherland" of 2nd degree.

In the fall of 2015, Mishchenko left senior positions. Then he became a defendant in a criminal case on the withdrawal of budgetary funds.
