= Eupithecia separata =

Scientific classification
- Domain: Eukaryota
- Kingdom: Animalia
- Phylum: Arthropoda
- Class: Insecta
- Order: Lepidoptera
- Family: Geometridae
- Genus: Eupithecia
- Species: E. separata

Binomial name
- Eupithecia separata Staudinger, 1879

Synonyms
- Eupithecia saueri Vojnits, 1978

Species of moth

Eupithecia separata is a moth in the family Geometridae. It is found in Turkey and Armenia.
