= Defence Counsel Sedov =

1988 Soviet film directed by Evgeniy Tsymbal

- Russian: Защитник Седов
- Directed by: Evgeniy Tsymbal
- Written by: Mariya Zvereva; Ilya Zverev
- Starring: Vladimir Ilyin; Albina Matveyeva; Tamara Chernova; Tatyana Rogozina; Vatslav Dvorzhetsky
- Cinematography: Vladimir Shevtsik
- Music by: Vadim Khrapachov
- Release date: 1988
- Running time: 42 minute
- Country: Soviet Union
- Language: Russian

Defence Counsel Sedov (Russian: Защитник Седов) is a 1988 Soviet film directed by Evgeniy Tsymbal.

The film takes place in 1937. The film tells about a Moscow lawyer who goes to a province for investigation. It is based on a short story by Ilya Zverev with the same name.

== Plot ==
Moscow lawyer Vladimir Sedov is visited by three women from a rural village, pleading for him to help overturn an unjust death sentence imposed on local agronomists accused under Article 58, a notorious Soviet law targeting "enemies of the state." Initially reluctant due to the political dangers of taking on such a case, Sedov eventually agrees under the women's emotional persuasion and travels to the provincial town of Ensk, where the trial is being held. Upon investigating, Sedov uncovers that the case is a complete fabrication, marred by gross procedural violations. He appeals to the "Great Prosecutor" (implied to be Andrey Vyshinsky), seeking justice.

Soon after, NKVD agents arrive at Sedov’s law office and take him into custody. He finds himself in a courtroom where the prosecutor dramatically announces that all officials involved in the investigation have been executed as "Trotskyite-Bukharinite agents", "saboteurs," and "spies," while the accused agronomists have been exonerated. The prosecutor urges the court to applaud Sedov for his "vigilance" in uncovering this latest "conspiracy." Although he has saved a few innocent lives, Sedov inadvertently becomes responsible for the deaths of many more.

== Cast ==
- Vladimir Ilyin
- Albina Matveyeva
- Tamara Chernova
- Tatyana Rogozina
- Vatslav Dvorzhetsky
- Vsevolod Larionov
- Garik Sukachyov
- Natalya Shchukina
- Aleksandr Zharkov
- Igor Nikolayev
