= Lazar Shaulov =

Russian businessman (born 1969)

Lazar Alexandrovich Shaulov
- Лазарь Александрович Шаулов
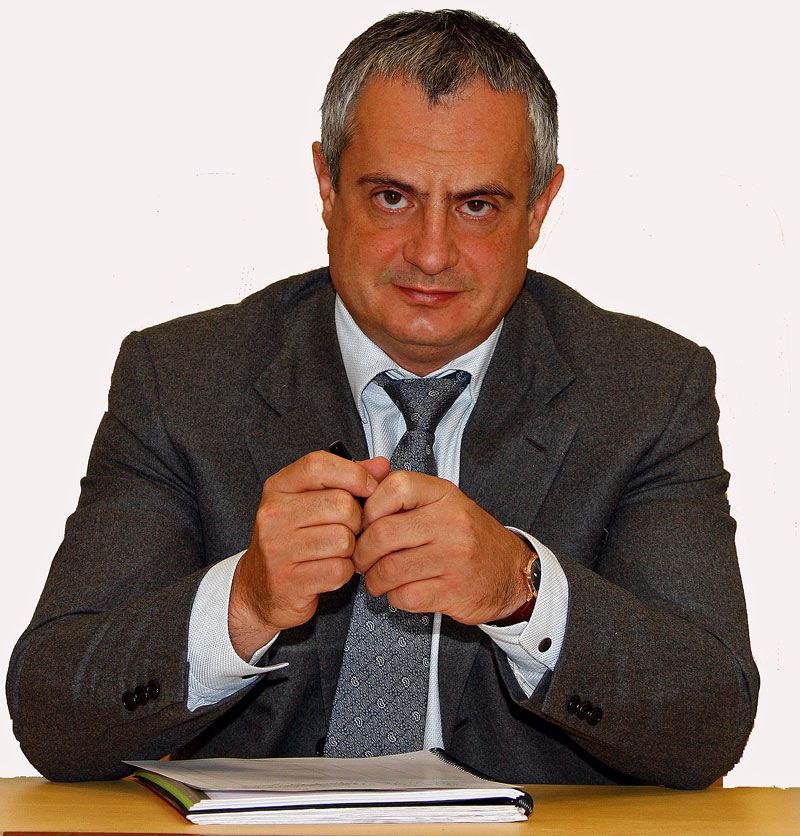
- Shaulov in 2013
- Born: Lazar Alexandrovich Shaulov; 18 February 1969 (age 57); Khasavyurt, USSR
- Education: Rostov State University
- Occupation: Businessman
- Known for: CEO of Unitile (2007–2012)
- Children: 6

Lazar Shaulov (Russian: Лазарь Александрович Шаулов) is a Russian businessman who was the founder and chairman of Unitile Group of Companies until 2014.

== Early life and education ==
Shaulov was born on 18 February 1969, in the city of Khasavyurt, Dagestan ASSR into a family of teachers. His father Alexander Lazarevich Shaulov (07.06.1935 - 07.12.2002) was a Cand. Sc. History; mother Tamara Ivanovna Shaulova (09.09.1940, nee Khripko) gave art and technical drawing lessons at a local public school. In 1971 the Shaulov family moved to the little town of Persianovka, Oktyabrsky District, Rostov Oblast, where his father gave history lessons at Don Agricultural College (now - Don State Agrarian University).

After passing his graduation exams at Novocherkassk's secondary public school No.32, where his mother taught art, Lazar Shaulov entered faculty of agriculture of Don Agricultural College, where he was one of the top students. Following a work placement session at the end of his sophomore year, Shaulov dropped out from college being unsatisfied with future prospects.

In 1988 he took up a job of apprentice lathe operator at Novocherkassk Electric Locomotive Plant, but two years later quit the job, deciding to follow in his father's footsteps. After almost two-years of preparation, Shaulov successfully entered the faculty of history at Rostov State University, which he graduated in 1995. His subject of dissertation was "Historiography on the role of foreign capitals in the period of the first industrial boom".

== Career ==
Lazar Shaulov began his career when he was a student. First, as a combine operator at the time of the harvest of 1987/1988, and was later engaged in retail book trade in Rostov on Don. In 1993 he was among the five shareholders who started the small-scale wholesale company "Lidya" and owned 20% of its share capital and of the voting rights. The company's next business line was the first national note-backed lending program, which was developed in cooperation with Rostov-based Centreinvest Bank. In 1994 Shaulov established and became head of the company "Finansovy Sputnik" (Financial Advisor), and subsequently several other companies engaged in stock-exchange deals.

In 1998 he took over as director-general of Shakhty-based plant "Stroyfarfor", producing ceramic tiles, eventually becoming its only shareholder and holder of 100% of the company’s stocks. In this time the factory upgraded its production processes and further developed into the holding company family Unitile, which was established in 2007 and also comprised Voronezh-based ceramics factory and "Kvarts" plant. By 2008 the group controlled over 20% of the domestic ceramic tiles market.

== Corporate dispute ==
The holding company was affected by the 2008 financial crisis, leading to a high level of liabilities, which reached 6.3 billion rubles by 2012.

Shaulov remained the sole shareholder of "Stroyfarfor" and appointed Leonid Maevsky to the office of the holding's director-general. However, Maevsky refused to meet obligations on Unitile's debt repayment, which led to corporate dispute. The dispute was settled after Shaulov gave over the effective control of the holding in favor of the investing company A1 (part of Alfa Group).

== Community activity ==
Lazar Shaulov was elected a deputy of Legislative Assembly of Rostov Oblast for two convocations. First, in October 2005 after a by-election held in Shakhty's electoral precinct No.11, with 70.25 per cent of the votes. Next, in March 2008 for the fourth convocation of the Assembly, in the same single-mandate electoral district.

== Personal life ==
Lazar Shaulov is married and has 6 children.
