= Nadezhda Belonenko =

Soviet Russian tennis player

- Country (sports): Soviet Union
- Born: 22 November 1911; Taganrog, Soviet Union
- Died: 1964 (age 53); Moscow, Soviet Union
- Turned pro: 1931 (amateur tour)
- Retired: 1961

Singles
- Career titles: 21

Nadezhda Mitrofanovna Slavinskaya-Belonenko (Russian: Надежда Митрофановна Славинская-Белоненко (born Nadezhda Belonenko), (22 November 1911 – 1964) was a Soviet tennis player, four-time Soviet Union Champion.

== Biography ==
Nadezhda Belonenko was born in the city of Taganrog. She graduated from the Taganrog Aviation Technical School and started practicing tennis in Taganrog in 1928. Belonenko became champion of North Caucasus in 1931 and 1932, champion (singles) of the Azov Sea and Black Sea region in 1934. She moved to Moscow in 1939.

== Career ==
Belonenko was a four-time champion of the USSR: 1948, 1949, 1950 (singles), and 1948 (doubles). She also reached the finals of USSR Championships twelve times: 1940, 1944–1946, 1951 (singles) and 1944–1945, 1947, 1949–1952 (doubles). 7-time winner of the All-Union Winter Competitions (1946–1949, 1951 and 1954 in singles and 1954 doubles). Champion of the All-Union Central Council of Professional Unions (ВЦСПС) in 1939, 1944–1945 in women singles, and in 1945 in doubles. Winner of the Estonia Open tournaments in singles and doubles in 1947–1948. 12-time Champion of Moscow in singles (1939, 1944–1946, 1947–1950, 1954–1955) and in doubles (winter of 1951). Winner of the Moscow Cup in 1947, playing for Spartak (sports society). Participant of several Moscow–Leningrad matches, and matches with tennis players from Chekhoslovakia (1938) and Hungary (1949). Belonenko coached at the Soviet Wings (ДСО "Крылья Советов") sports society from 1942 to 1946.

Belonenko was continuously included into the top ten USSR tennis players from 1943 to 1955, topping the rating three times - from 1948 to 1950.

She retired in 1961 and died in Moscow in 1964.

In the 1980s in her home city of Taganrog, traditional annual memorial tennis tournaments (Мемориал Белоненко – Memorial Belonenko) were held.

== Awards ==
- Master of Sports of the USSR in 1950
- Candidate of Pedagogical Science degree in 1954
