= Gaetano Molla =

Giuseppe Cesare Gaetano Molla (1845 – 1894) was an Italian impresario, conductor, pianist, and opera director. Born in Milan, then part of the Austrian Empire, he first came to prominence as the chorus-master at La Scala. After touring with the opera company to Russian Empire in 1863, he settled in Taganrog where he became director of the Taganrog Theatre. He became the center of the town's music life for the next 31 years, notably organizing a new and highly successful symphony orchestra for the city. Among his admirers was a young Anton Chekhov. Gaetano Molla died in a train on the way from Kharkiv to Taganrog.

February 9, 2012 a memorial plaque dedicated to Gaetano Molla and Valerian Molla, founders of music education in Taganrog was placed on the front entrance of the Taganrog Tchaikovsky School for Music.
