= Taganrog Theatre =

Russian drama theater

Coordinates: 47°12′58″N 38°55′43″E

The Taganrog Drama Theater named after Anton Chekhov and decorated with Order of Honor
- Таганрогский ордена Почёта драматический театр имени А.П.Чехова
- Taganrog Theater; Таганрогский театр
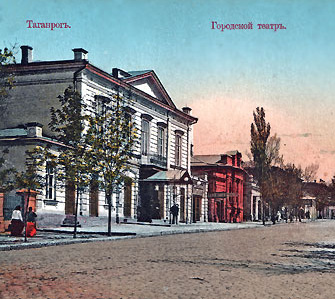
- Taganrog City Theater as it appears on a 19th-century postcard
- Interactive map of The Taganrog Drama Theater named after Anton Chekhov and decorated with Order of Honor
- Address: Ulitsa Petrovskaya 90; Taganrog; Russia
- Designation: Listed as a landmark in the regional register(объект культурного значения регионального значения)

Construction
- Opened: 1827
- Rebuilt: 1866 (in a new building)

Website
- www.chehovsky.ru

The Taganrog Drama Theater named after Anton Chekhov and decorated with Order of Honor (Russian: Таганрогский ордена Почёта драматический театр имени А.П.Чехова) is a traditional Russian drama theater based in Taganrog, Rostov Oblast.

== Foundation and early years ==
The Taganrog Theater was established in 1827 by governor Alexander Dunaev.

== Italian opera ==
Since 1861, Italian opera regularly performed in Taganrog. In 1874, the Taganrog Municipality acquired the theater building by the purchase of its stocks.

== Young Anton Chekhov in the theater ==
Anton Chekhov who was born in Taganrog in 1860 was in love with theater and literature from his childhood. As a teenager Chekhov fell in love with the Taganrog Theatre. He attended the theatre on a regular basis and became enchanted and inspired by productions of vaudevilles, Italian operas and popular comedies.

== History ==
=== 20th century ===
In 1901, the first movie was shown onstage Taganrog City Theater.

In 1944, the Soviet of People's Commissars of USSR named the Taganrog City Theater after Anton Pavlovich Chekhov.

On February 22, 1977 the theater received the Order of the Badge of Honour for services to the development of Soviet theatrical art.

Since 1980, the theater festival In the Birthplace of Anton Chekhov (Russian: На родине А.П.Чехова) has been held with participation of theaters from Russia, Ukraine, Georgia, Italy, Croatia, Spain, Australia, Belarus, Germany and Japan.

=== 21st century ===
In 2002 and in 2010, the theater performed at the International Literary & Musical Forum in Badenweiler, Germany, staging Anton Chekhov's Proposal and The Wood Demon.

In October 2006, the theater participated at the 1st International Blacksea Theater Festival in Mykolaiv, Ukraine.

In April 2009, the theater won 3 awards at the International Theater Festival "Golden Key" in Donetsk, Ukraine.

On January 29, 2010 within the framework of Anton Chekhov's 150th birth anniversary celebrations in Taganrog, the President of Russia Dmitri Medvedev visited the Taganrog theater, where he watched a rehearsal of the performance "Everything Starts in the Childhood", dedicated to Anton Chekhov.

In October–November 2012 the Taganrog Drama Theater hosted the international production "Passions of Romeo" (IUGTE International Shakespeare Performance Project - "Страсти по Ромео.like/unlike". Театральные сновидения по мотивам пьесы В.Шекспира "Ромео и Джульетта"). The performance was created with participation of Russian actors in collaboration with the international production group (Ireland, Spain, Greece, UK, Mexico, Switzerland, USA).

== Gallery ==
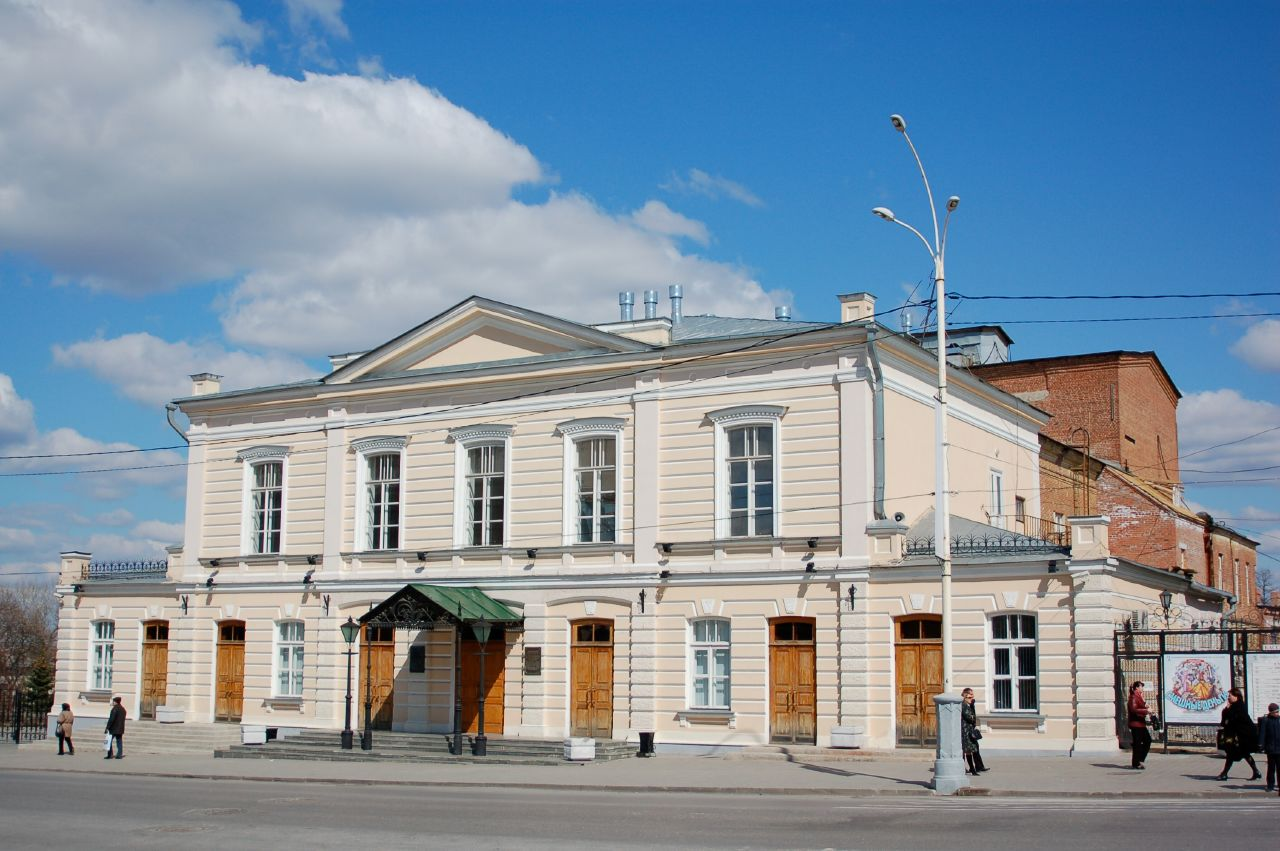
Taganrog Theater in 2007.

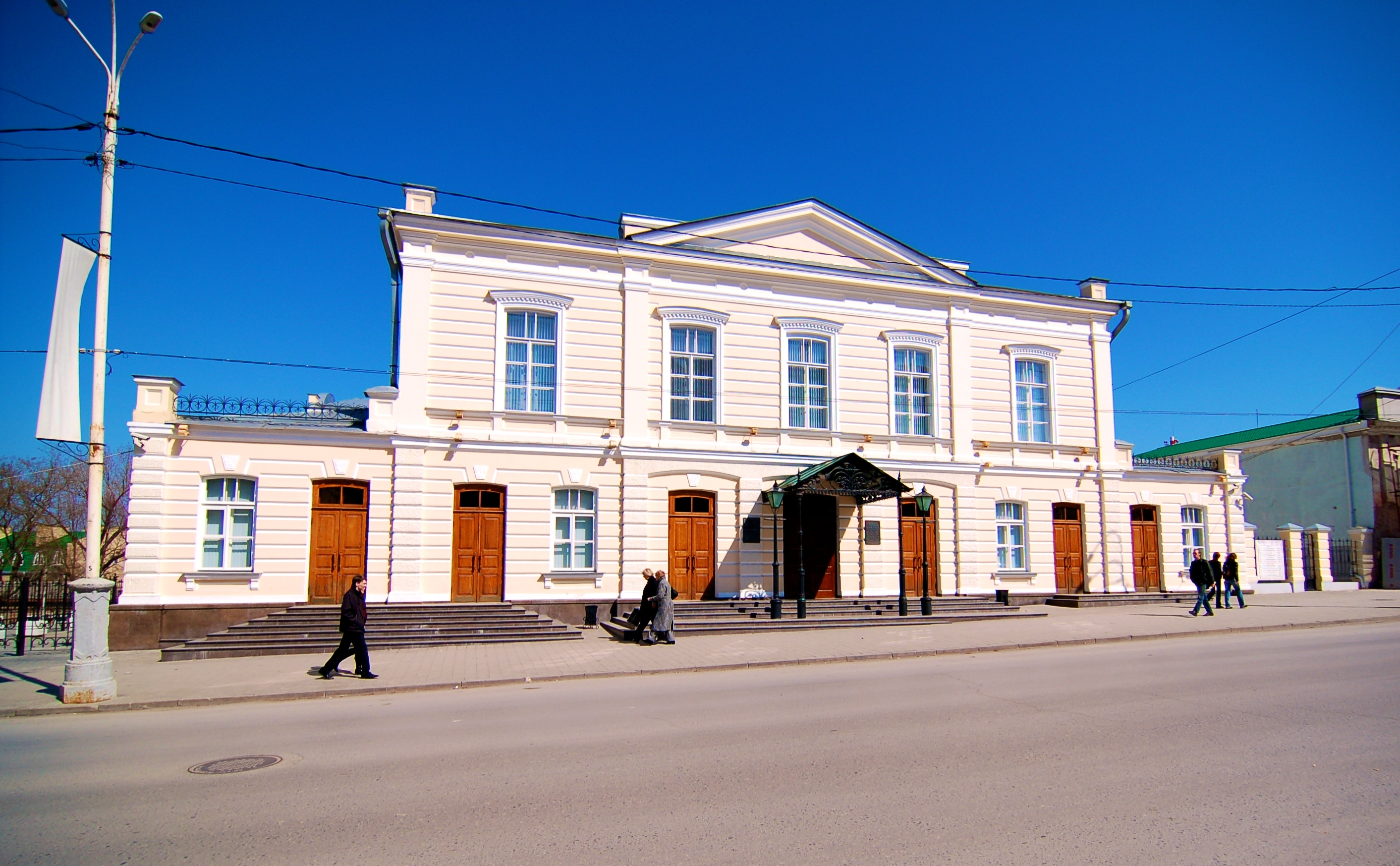
Taganrog Theater in 2008.

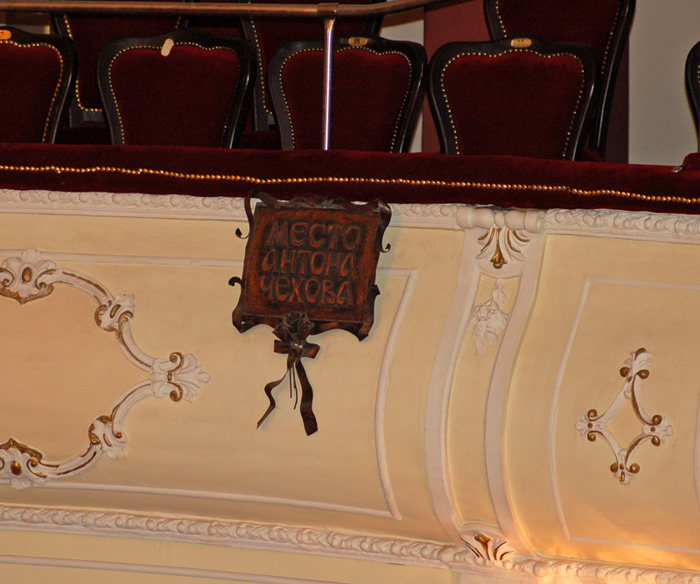
The favorite seat of Anton Chekhov.

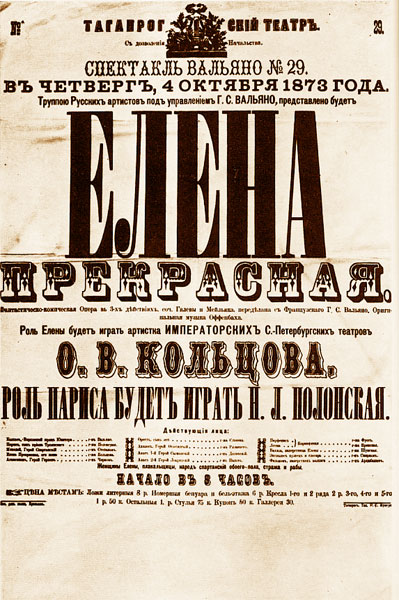
Offenbach's Elena the Beautiful bill of October 4, 1873 - the first theater visit of Anton Chekhov.

== Notable people throughout the history of the theater ==
- Anton Chekhov - Russian playwright and short-story writer
- Ivan Perestiani - People's Artist of the Georgian SSR
- Sergei Bondarchuk - Soviet film director, screenwriter, and actor, People's Artist of the USSR, Academy Award(1968).
- Aristarkh Livanov - Russian actor, designated People's artist of Russia (1999).
- Gaetano Molla
- Nestor Kukolnik - Russian playwright and prose writer
- Samuel Maykapar - Russian composer
- Petr Shelokhonov - Russian actor, designated Honorable Actor of Russia (1979).
- Vatslav Dvorzhetsky - Soviet Russian actor
