= Sergei Alphéraky =

Russian ornithologist and entomologist (1850 – c. 1918)

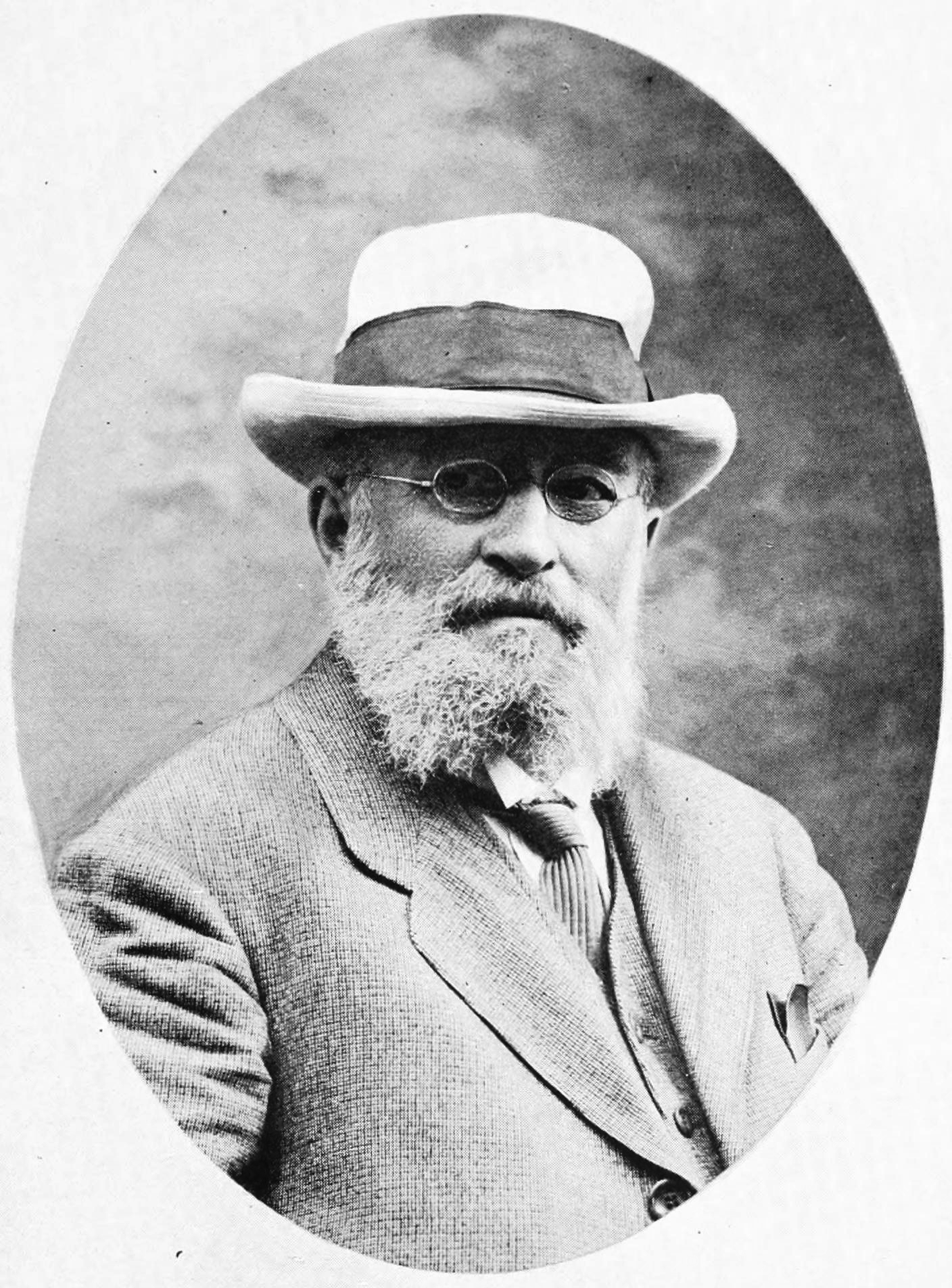
Sergei Alphéraky

Sergei Nikolaevich Alphéraky (also Alferaki; Russian: Сергей Николаевич Алфераки; 14 April 1850 – c. 1918) was a Greek-Russian ornithologist and entomologist who specialised in Lepidoptera.

== Life ==
Sergei Alphéraky was born in Kharkov into the noble Greek family of Alferakis. He was the brother of composer Achilles Alferaki. His father, Nikos Alferakis, owned the Alferaki Palace in Taganrog. Sergei studied at Moscow University (1867–1869), then with Otto Staudinger in Dresden (1871–1873). He also studied taxidermy techniques in Paris from Émile Deyrolle. On his return to Russia he worked on the Lepidoptera of the Taganrog, Rostov-on-Don region. He also collected in the North Caucasus. After that he devoted himself to the insects, especially Lepidoptera, of Central Asia. He worked on the Lepidoptera collected by Nikolai Przhevalsky in Tibet held by the Zoological Museum of the Russian Academy of Science and those collected by Grigorij Nikolaevich Potanin in China and Mongolia in the same institution. Later he studied the collections made by Alfred Otto Herz in Amur, Korea and Kamchatka, and those of Nicholas Mikhailovich Romanoff (Grand Duke Nicholas Mikhailovich), a friend from his two years at Moscow University. He was an honorary member of both the Russian Entomological Society and the Royal Entomological Society of London.

Alphéraky was arrested in Petrograd during the Russian revolution in 1917 and according to some sources he was shot dead right there, while others believe he was imprisoned and shot in 1919.

== Works ==
- 1875–1878. "Cheshuekrylyya (Lepidoptera) okrestnostei Taganroga (The Butterflies (Lepidoptera) of the environs of Taganrog)" Trudy RusskagoEntomologicheskago obshchestva, 8: 150–226 (1875); 10: 35–53 (1876); 11: 45–50 (1878) (in Russian).
- 1881–1883. "Lépidoptères du district de Kouldjà et des montagnes environ-nantes." Horae Societatis Entomologicae Rossica, 16: 334–435, (1881); 17: 15–103 (1882), 156–227 (1883) (in French).
- "Lépidoptères rapportés du Thibet par le Général N.M. Przewalsky de son voyage de 1884-1885." Mémoires sur les Lépidoptères, 5: 59-80 Edited by Nicholas Mikhailovich Romanoff. 1889
- 1905. The Geese of Europe and Asia. London, Rowland Ward. 1905. 24 plates by Frederick William Frohawk.
- 1908. "Cheshuekryle Okrenestei Taganroga (The Butterflies of the environs of Taganrog)." Supplément III. Horae Societatis Entomologicae Rossica, 38:558–618 (in French and Russian).
