= Orlova and Alexandrov =

- Genre: Drama, Biopic
- Written by: Vladimir Sotnikov, Anna Berseneva, Vitaly Moskalenko
- Directed by: Vitaly Moskalenko
- Starring: Olesya Sudzilovskaya, Anatoliy Beliy, Nikolai Dobrynin, Yulia Rutberg, Vitaly Khaev
- Composers: Yevgeny Kadimsky, Vladimir Kripak
- Country of origin: Russia
- Original language: Russian
- No. of seasons: 1
- No. of episodes: 16

Production
- Executive producer: Sergey Kulikov
- Producer: Anatoly Chizhikov
- Cinematography: Ilya Dyomin
- Production company: Favorit Film

Original release
- Network: Channel One
- Release: 16 March – 26 March 2015

Orlova and Alexandrov (Russian: Орлова и Александров) is a 2015 Russian historical drama television series that depicts the long and complex relationship between Soviet actress Lyubov Orlova and director Grigory Alexandrov. The series was created by Vitaly Moskalenko and written by Vladimir Sotnikov, Anna Berseneva, and Moskalenko. It first aired on Channel One Russia from March 16 to 26, 2015. The drama portrays the couple’s personal and professional lives against the backdrop of Stalinist Russia, as well as the creation of some of the most iconic films of the Soviet era, such as Jolly Fellows, Circus, and Volga-Volga.

== Plot ==
The series begins in the 1920s, where the aristocratic Orlova family struggles to survive after the Russian Revolution. Orlova, who sells milk in Moscow, meets Alexandrov and filmmaker Ivan Pyryev. Orlova’s father dies, and she is forced to marry a man named Andrei Berzin. Meanwhile, Orlova gets accepted into the Stanislavski and Nemirovich-Danchenko Theatre under the guidance of Vladimir Nemirovich-Danchenko, while Alexandrov starts collaborating with Sergey Eisenstein on films. Over the next several episodes, Orlova’s career flourishes as she becomes involved with Alexandrov, and their personal and professional lives become increasingly intertwined. Orlova’s first major role in Jolly Fellows causes tension on set, as she and Alexandrov face romantic jealousy, political conspiracies, and sabotage by their colleagues.

As the series progresses, Orlova and Alexandrov navigate a turbulent political landscape, where their films face censorship and political interference from Soviet authorities, including Boris Shumyatsky and Lavrentiy Beria. In one episode, the couple secretly marries in a church, and later, Orlova faces intense scrutiny and accusations of complicity with the state. Meanwhile, Alexandrov is accused of musical plagiarism, and a power struggle between him and other filmmakers such as Eisenstein and Pyryev develops. Personal betrayals, including Orlova’s miscarriage and suspicions of an affair between Alexandrov and his assistant, add to the drama. By the final episodes, Orlova and Alexandrov, having experienced career and personal setbacks, continue to work together, with their relationship enduring under Stalin's regime.

== Cast ==
- Olesya Sudzilovskaya as Lyubov Orlova
- Anatoliy Beliy as Grigory Alexandrov
- Nikolay Dobrynin as Leonid Utyosov
- Yulia Rutberg as Faina Ranevskaya
- Vitaly Khaev as Sergey Eisenstein
- Andrey Smolyakov as Maxim Gorky
- Roman Madyanov as Igor Ilyinsky
- Olya Pavlovets as Olga Ivanova, Alexandrov's first wife
- Alexey Fateev as Ivan Pyryev
- Alexey Vertkov as Nikolai Erdman
- Lyudmila Chursina as Evgenia Nikolaevna, Lyubov Orlova’s mother
- Alexandra Ursulyak as Nonna, Lyubov Orlova’s sister
- Yevgeny Knyazev as Joseph Stalin
- Adam Bulguchyov as Lavrentiy Beria
- Boris Khvoshnyansky as Boris Shumyatsky
- Irina Egorova as Liya Shumyatskaya
- Sergey Chirkov as Vladimir Nilssen
- Dmitry Surzhikov as Andrei Berzin
- Andrius Paulavicius as Franz
- Guram Bablishvili as Sergo Geladze
- Dmitry Sukhomlinov as Eduard Tisse
- Evgeny Aranovsky as Isaac Dunaevsky
- Nikolay Leshchukov as Alexander Poskryobyshev
- Alexander Vdovin as Mikhail Kalinin
- Igor Maslov as Narcom Bubonov
- Sergey Ershov as Vyacheslav Molotov
- Alexander Bobrovsky as Fedor Shalyapin
- Dmitry Voronin as Maxim Shtraukh
- Mikhail Karpenko as Sergey Stoliarov
