= Lyubov Orlova =

Soviet actress and singer (1902–1975)

- Любовь Орлова
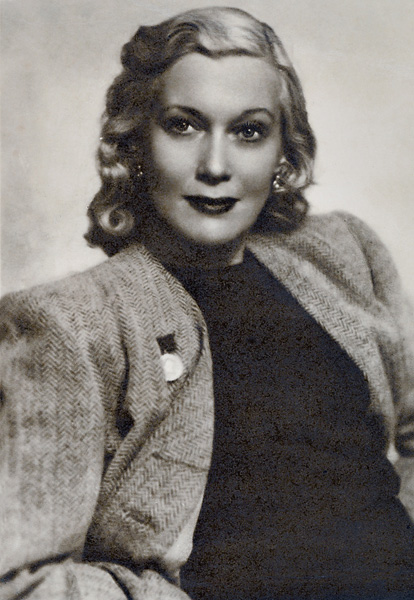
- Orlova with her State Stalin Prize badge in 1945
- Born: Lyubov Petrovna Orlova; 11 February 1902; Zvenigorod, Russia
- Died: 26 January 1975 (aged 72); Moscow, Soviet Union
- Resting place: Novodevichy Cemetery, Moscow; 55°43′29″N 37°33′15″E
- Education: Moscow Conservatory
- Occupations: Actress, pianist, singer, dancer
- Years active: 1926–1974
- Spouse(s): Andrei Berzin (m. 1926; div. 1930) Grigori Aleksandrov (m. 1933)
- Awards: People's Artist of the USSR; USSR State Prize ×2; Order of Lenin; Order of the Red Banner of Labour ×2

Lyubov Petrovna Orlova (Russian: Любовь Петровна Орлова [lʲʊˈbofʲ pʲɪˈtrovnə ɐrˈɫovə]; 11 February [O.S. 29 January] 1902 – 26 January 1975) was a Soviet and Russian actress, singer, dancer, and People's Artist of the USSR (1950).

== Life and career ==
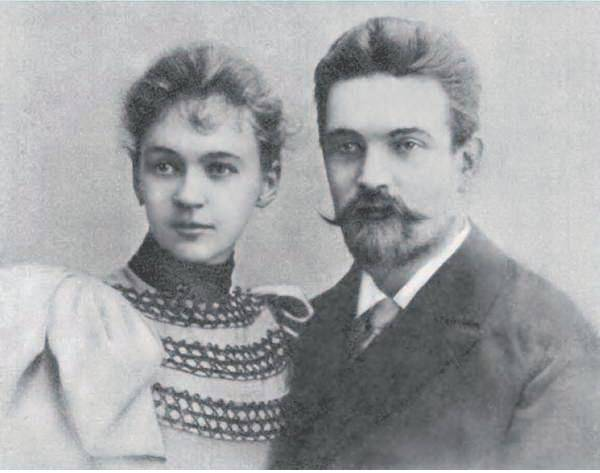
Lyubov Orlova's parents, Evgeniya Nikolaevna Sukhotina (1863—1945) and Pyotr Fedorovich Orlov (1867—1938), 19th century

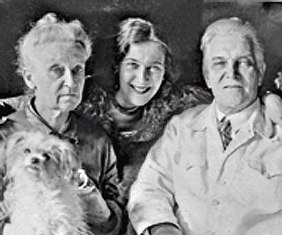
Lyubov Orlova with her parents, early 1930s

Lyubov Orlova was born to a family of Russian hereditary nobles on her maternal side and gentry on her paternal side in Zvenigorod, 60 km from Moscow, then lived with her parents and older sister in Yaroslavl. Her acting and singing talents were evident very early on, but her noble parents considered acting a disgraceful career and directed her towards classical music. There she began to study music. In 1914, after her father left for the front, her mother Evgenia Nikolaevna and her daughters settled in Moscow, where the sisters entered the gymnasium. The Orlovs spent the difficult years of the Civil War in Voskresensk because their mother's sister lived here. The family subsisted on funds from the sale of milk which was given by the aunt's cow. Lyuba and Nonna drove nearly a hundred kilometers to Moscow, and then went home, with heavy cans. Hence comes the legend of the ugly hands which Orlova was so shy about. Her first and last names are meaningful words in Russian: любовь means "love", and Орлова is the feminine form of орлов "eagle's".

When she was seven, Fyodor Shalyapin predicted her future as a famous actress. In 1919–1922, she studied as a piano student at the Moscow Conservatory under Karl Kipp but did not graduate because she had to work as a music teacher and a pianist-illustrator of silent films in movie theaters (French: tapeur) to support her parents. In 1925, she has graduated from the Moscow Theatre College, choreography department. Her first husband, a Soviet economist, Andrei Berzin, was arrested in 1930. However, this did not affect her career. Dmitri Shcheglov, a biography author, wrote in Love and Mask ('Lyubov i maska', 1997): "As an eternal irony and foresight of fate, the best performer of the roles of house servants and enthusiasts of Communist labor was a descendant of ten Russian Orthodox saints. Two of them, Olga, the Grand Princess of Kiev, and Vladimir, the Grand Prince of Kiev, are among the Equal-to-apostles... Red Eagle in an azure-golden field, the House of Orlov's coat of arms, is also present on the Bezhetsk clan branch the actress belonged to..." The Orlov family was partly saved from the worst form of repression, camps or deportation, and the Bolshevik "redistribution of property" only because even before the Revolution, her father Peter had lost all three of his estates at cards, and therefore there was practically nothing to take away. However, Orlova's father, an engineer and class enemy, was officially banned as an employee.

In September 1926, she was hired as a choir singer by the Nemirovich-Danchenko Theatre Music Studio finally deciding to become an actress, not a pianist. She received her first solo role in November, the same year. Her quick promotion was fueled by Olga Baclanova's sudden departure from Russia and Vladimir Nemirovich-Danchenko's eye for this type of female beauty. In 1932, she received her first leading roles in La Périchole and Les cloches de Corneville. Despite her success with the public, vocal and acting training in a theatre with Ksenia Kolubai, Orlova wasn't noticed by the press and was criticized by her colleagues for not having a real singing voice (Faina Ranevskaya, her close friend, used to say "Orlova is a gorgeous actress for sure. But her voice! When she sings it sounds like somebody is urinating in an empty bucket.") However, Orlova had her "trick". Remembering her student years (and she studied at the choreography department of the Moscow Theater College named after A.V. Lunacharsky, now - GITIS), she decided to bring herself back to her previous form and perform Serpoletta's entrance aria on pointe. Alexander Hort, writer, wrote: "The audience was smitten: while dancing, Serpoletta stood up on pointe shoes, so graceful, airy, romantic! And Orlova made a tactically verified move, she took the bull by the horns: the very first vocal number, Serpoletta's verses 'What a pity that an unsettling case pushed me to a different path!' she performed, dancing on her fingers." In the future, no one was able to repeat this trick, it has stayed as a semi-legendary fact of history.

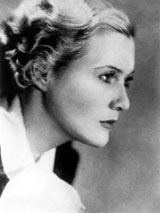
Lyubov Orlova in her 30s

In 1933, she met the then-unknown director Grigory Alexandrov, who was looking for actors for his film Jolly Fellows (1934). The two began a relationship and later married. Orlova's performance in this comedy, very popular in the USSR, earned the young star the sympathy of Stalin and the title "Honorable actor of the RSFSR". It had caused the first wave of the so-called "Orlova syndrome", a Soviet psychiatric term describing women who wanted to be like Orlova. They diligently lightened their hair and self-styled themselves as relatives to the idol. According to her relatives, Orlova secretly loathed Joseph Stalin, reacting to the war-winning dictator's death with the words: "Finally, this scum is dead". Her critics, including Sergei Eisenstein, had blamed the musician-turned-actress for ruining the serious career of Alexandrov. Despite her efforts, Orlova didn't have a reputation of a serious drama actress, moreover, she was intentionally overplaying her film roles and didn't stop her constant touring as a singer. Her haters credited her success to the marriage of convenience and Stalin protection.

In the next few years she starred in four popular movies which also became instant Soviet classics: Circus (1936), Volga-Volga (1938), Tanya (1940), and Springtime (1947). She was awarded the Stalin Prize in 1941. In 1950, she became the first woman to receive the title of the People's Artist of the USSR exclusively for her cinematic works. After that, she switched to playing in theatre productions of Yuri Zavadsky's company. Her most famous roles included Nora - Nora, Dear Liar - Patrick Campbell, Strange Mrs. Savage - Mrs. Ethel Savage. But her most acclaimed performance was a title role in Lizzie MacKay (Russian title for The Respectful Prostitute). Jean-Paul Sartre was present on a jubilee 400th show in 1962, saying: "I was especially impressed by Lyubov Orlova's talented performance. After the show, I told her I've been delighted by her performance. It was not an empty compliment. Lyubov Orlova is really the best of all LizzieMacKay performers I know."

From 1928 until her death she was constantly touring as a singer with her pianist Leo Mironov (Russian: Лев Миронов, romanized: Lev Mironov). Her early repertoire included classical songs by Glinka, Mussorgsky, Dargomyzhsky and Tchaikovsky. During the Great Patriotic War, she toured more than 50,000 kilometers along the front line, with her concerts based on Isaak Dunayevsky songs from her movies. For all of her career, she was banned from making the records of her songs and performing on television, supposedly because of her "backstage war" with Klavdiya Shulzhenko, Leonid Utesov's choice of interest for Jolly Fellows. Ivan Kozlovsky especially regretted the absence of recordings of his own duets with Orlova.

== Awards and honours ==
- Honored Artist of the RSFSR (1935)
- People's Artist of the RSFSR (5.11.1947)
- People's Artist of the USSR (6.03.1950)
- Stalin Prize, first class
  - 1941 — for the role 'Marion Dixon' in the film Circus (1936) and the role 'Arrow' in the film Volga-Volga (1938)
  - 1950 — for the role 'an American journalist Jeannette Sherwood' in the film Encounter at the Elbe (1949)
- Order of Lenin (1.02.1939)
- Orders of the Red Banner of Labour (1.04.1938, 4.11.1967)
- Medal "For the Defence of the Caucasus" (1944)
- Medal "For Valiant Labour in the Great Patriotic War 1941–1945" (1945)
- Medal "In Commemoration of the 800th Anniversary of Moscow" (1947)
- Medal "For the Development of Virgin Lands"
- For Valiant Labour – Jubilee Medal "In Commemoration of the 100th Anniversary of the Birth of Vladimir Ilyich Lenin" (1970)
- Anniversary badge "XX Years of Soviet Cinematography" (1940)
- VIII Venice Film Festival (1947, Special Prize for the best female role in Springtime (shared with Ingrid Bergman).
- IV International Film Festival in Mariánské Lázně (1949, Peace Prize for the film Encounter at the Elbe)
- Certificate of honor from the Soviet Peace Committee (1960)

== Personal relationships ==
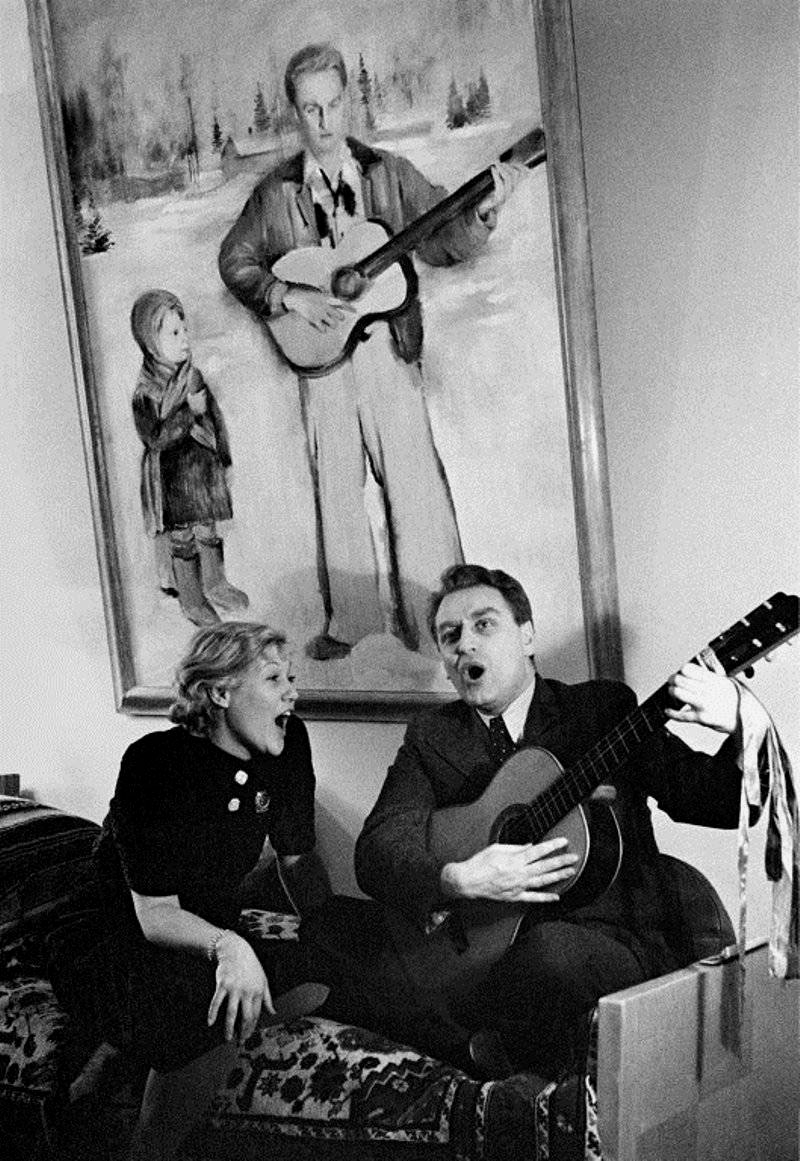
Lyubov Orlova sings with Grigoi Aleksandrov in 1937

In 1926 or, according to her grandniece Nonna Golikova, in 1921, Lyubov Orlova married a Soviet economist Andrei Berzin (1893-1951), the deputy head of the administrative and financial department for the People's Commissariat of Agriculture. Berzin supported not only Orlova, but her parents, and older sister, all of them also moved to his place. Orlova had married to save her relatives from death but she absolutely didn't love her husband and had an abortion or a miscarriage that, highly likely, had left her barren for the rest of her life. Berzin has understood and accepted that asking her to file for divorce and save herself from the inevitable labor camps or deportation, as both the wife of enemy of the people and the daughter of class enemy, just before his next arrest by NKVD. She had agreed. After that, Lyubov and all of her relatives had to move from Berzin's gorgeous apartment in the center of Moscow.

In 1931, Orlova became a partner of a 'German specialist', engineer or businessman, named Franz. Nothing more is known about him. Their romance developed for about a year. After her performances, a foreign admirer picked the actress in a black Mercedes. Franz bought Orlova expensive foreign outfits that arouse the envy of all women, especially in a theatre. Orlova moved to her beloved in the Metropol hotel, where he lived in a luxurious room. When Lyubov Orlova was invited to shoot Jolly Fellows, which took place in Gagra, Franz went with her. At that time, Lyuba was already familiar with Grigory Alexandrov, then separated for many years from his wife, actress Olga Ivanova. Olga and Grigory had a son named Douglas (1925-1978) but at that time she was in relationships with the famous actor Boris Tiomkin. In Gagra, Orlova's affection for Aleksandrov became obvious. She had explained the situation to Franz and he left, first for Moscow and then for his homeland. Faina Ranevskaya remembered in 1982: "Don't you know how handsome Aleksandrov, Lyubochka's director, friend, husband, used to be? He was handsome like Antinous even though I've never seen Antinous personally. Like Philemon and Baucis, they loved each other.".

In January 1934, or, according to a different archive source, in 1937, Orlova married Aleksandrov. However, because of the couple's suspicious lack of children and Aleksandrov's unclear relationships and painful breakup with Sergei Eisenstein, for the many decades, a lot of researchers have perceived Orlova as "a beard" to conceal Aleksandrov's bisexuality in exchange for the richer career opportunities. Later in life, Aleksandrov had answered about his wife's lack of children, according to his relative, the following: "In the beginning, she didn't want, and later she couldn't".

After Aleksandrov ex-wife Olga's death during childbirth in June 1941, when she was already married to Boris Tiomkin, Orlova has adopted his son Douglas (forcefully renamed to 'Vasili' during the next purges, arrested in 1952, had his first heart attack in prison, was liberated after Joseph Stalin's death the next year). In 1975, Orlova died and in 1978, Vasili died. In 1979, Vasili's widow Galina Krylova married the mentally sick Grigori Aleksandrov to serve as his maid in exchange for a subsequent property and archive. She loathed Lyubov Orlova for arrogance towards her and her previous husband, and towards her son, Aleksandrov's grandson. Grigori Aleksandrov died in 1983, his documentary about his wife Lyubov Orlova was released in 1984. The wide has buried his corpse on the same line, the opposite side, of Novodevichy Cemetery as Lyubov Orlova's grave. For many decades, Orlova-Aleksandrov's archive had been plundered before being bought from Aleksandrov's descendants by the Russian-Jewish lawyer Aleksandr Dobrovinsky.

== Political views ==
Orlova was never a member of the Communist Party, even when her husband has joined it in 1954, following Joseph Stalin's death. In the 1960s, another Soviet actress Tatiana Bestayeva was unsuccessfully recruited by the KGB, in order for her to inform the authorities about the luminaries of Mossovet Theatre: Lyubov Orlova, Rostislav Plyatt, and Gennadi Bortnikov.

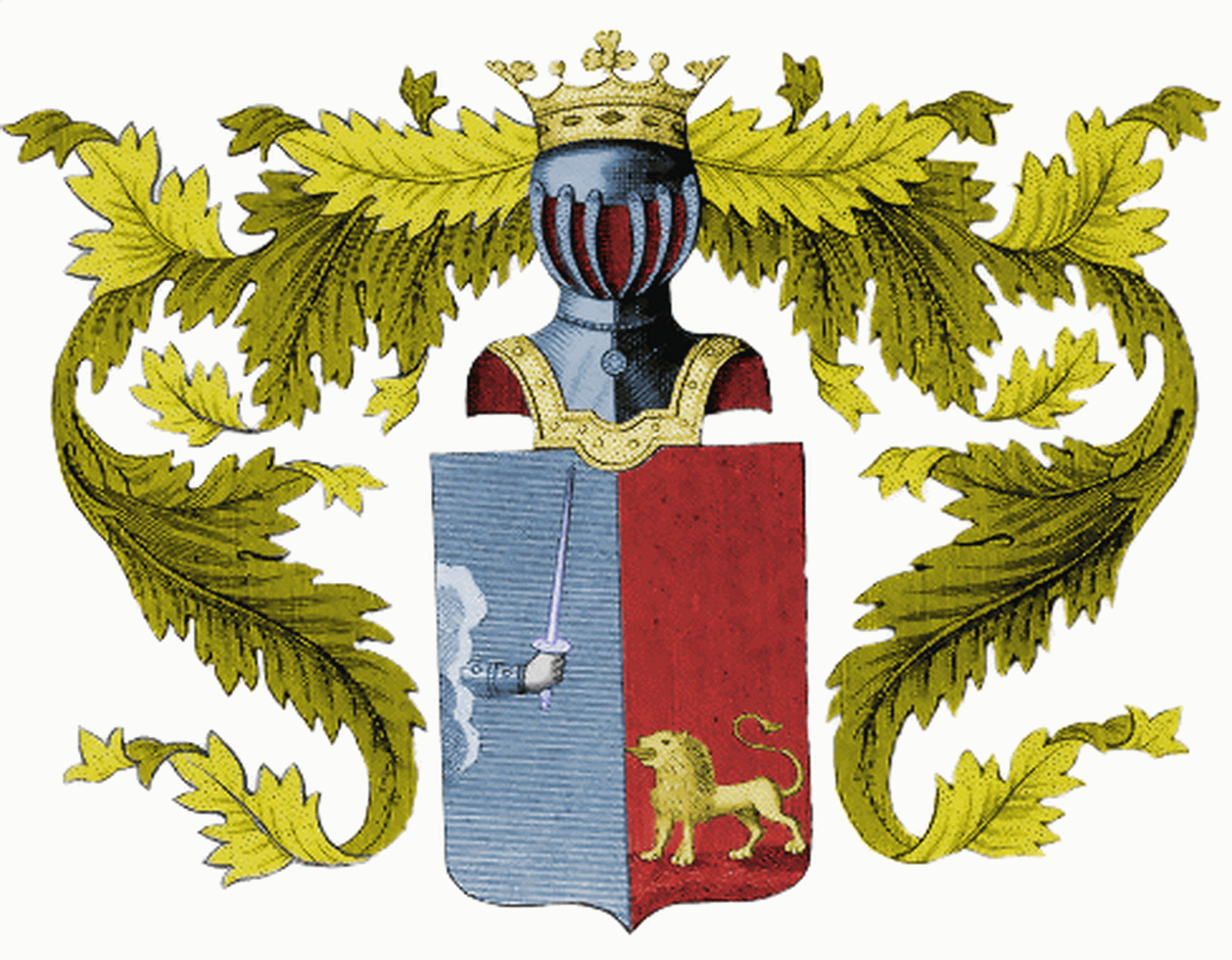
Coat of arms of Sukhotin family includes à la Minor Pogon hand and golden lion (Note: House-of-Romanov-era Russian heraldists weren't precise to draw the description of "lion passant" as "lion statant".)

Orlova's movies include a decent amount of plot-defining in-jokes about the composers, (Beethoven in Jolly Fellows, Volga-Volga, Johann Sebastian Bach in Starling and Lyre), and a-la virtuoso grand piano performances (Circus, about virtuosity as a word with the previous meaning 'virtue', Springtime). Grigori Aleksandrov credited his second wife Orlova, she was fluent in both French and German, as a co-editor of his scripts. In the autobiography, he wrote: "It was enough for her to try by ear a piece of the script which had previously was lying on my desktop in a state of blissful well-being. All the imperfections of the material that was not completely written out were personally revealed to me. Lyubov Petrovna unusually sensed the slightest falsity". On a contrary, the Russian upper-class has historically preferred Italian opera and French ballet, as brands, a lot more than anything else and these facts were concluded, by Aleksandrov and Orlova in The Composer Glinka and Mussorgsky, in a still popular statement about Russian political elites, House of Romanov especially, being historically Russophobic. In 2018, The Economist has also pointed out the significant role of Russian Orthodox Church and "the ghost of the Romanovs" in Putin's Russia. Feodor Nikitich Romanov (1553-1633, Patriarch Filaret of Moscow, de facto ruler of Russia during the reign of his son, Mikhail) descended from the Rurik dynasty through a female line, his mother, Evdokiya Gorbataya-Shuyskaya was a Rurikid princess from the Shuysky branch, daughter of Alexander Gorbatyi-Shuisky. The last tsar Nicholas II was described as "limited, stupid" and "degenerate" even by the usually polite first Russian Nobel Prize winner, physiologist Ivan Pavlov.

In 1936, following her role of a young mother in Circus, Orlova was given an order to participate, among the best-known women in the country, in the discussion, and, practically, in the approval of the law banning the abortion. According to M. Kushnirov, the executive editor of the radio who prepared a text for her to read, in general, welcoming, of course, the wise project of the Stalin government "On mother and child, on family and abortion", the actress "has allowed herself to make some amendments and additions to it".

On alimony, Orlova added: "It is irrational to punish a father-defaulter with prison, he must be forced to work." On abortion: "There should be no doom in the abortion clause. In Soviet society, there are many independent women, many professions in which a woman successfully competes with a man... Pregnancy will tear a woman out of her job, maybe at the very moment when she completes a grandiose project or prepares for a heroic flight, or finishes work over a big role for which she has spent several years of her life, and, perhaps, at this crucial moment of her life, her social and political biography, she is forced to give up everything and lose a year of time. In such cases, let the woman give birth a little later. Let abortion be allowed in these cases. Let the woman know the law is not fatal. It seems to me, lately, all women want to give birth, everyone wants to have a child. I myself want a child, and I will certainly have one. And it is natural. Life is getting more and more joyful and more fun. The future is even more wonderful. Why not give birth?"

In 1939, Orlova also perceived the annexation of Polish territories of Ukraine and Belarus through the eyes of a musician. She wrote in Komsomolskaya Pravda the following: "Once these lands were the lands of the Belarusian and Ukrainian people. The same rains watered them, the same sun shone on them, and the same winds swept over their valleys and hills. But two decades ago, a border passed through these lands. For one part of the Belarusian and Ukrainian people, the land was shrouded in grave gloom, for another it blossomed with extraordinary colors which only the land of happy people can shine with."

Orlova continued: "In one part of the land, in the West, people have even forgotten how to sing, they were forbidden to sing. The oppressors saw the sounds of a Ukrainian or Belarusian song as a danger for themselves. These songs could remind the disadvantaged of another world that began so disturbingly close, there behind this fishing line, there behind this village... Now the song broke free. Millions of lips have recently been looking for words of a curse to express their hatred towards the Polish landlords. Now, these millions of lips are looking for the words of happiness that are unusual for them in order to glorify a new life, the Red Army, the Soviet government, the wise Stalin." Orlova not only responded in writing to the annexation of the "old" new lands to the USSR. The Soviet press reported in October 1939: "In Western Ukraine and Western Belarus there are concert brigades of the USSR State Academic Bolshoi Theater and the All-Union Concert and Touring Association, including I. Kozlovsky, M. Reizen, R. Zelyonaya, S. Obraztsov, L. Orlova, V. Yakhontov.

In 1952, according to the witnesses, there was a failed attempt to assassinate Orlova for her political views. Her grandniece Nonna Golikova wrote: "In 1952, Lyubov Petrovna gave a concert in some border town in Western Ukraine, where, as we know, active anti-Russian sentiments and political movements have always existed. Orlova in the final of the concert went to bows. Someone from the audience gave her an extraordinary bouquet of roses. 'I immediately drew attention to it,' Lyubochka told us later. - 'Now I understand that it was for mourning. White roses, and in the middle are completely unusual - black ones. I've never seen such people.' She took the bouquet. The paper it was wrapped in was torn from the side facing it. Lyubochka pricked her finger, the thorns were soaked in poison. Rapid blood poisoning began, Orlova's life was in danger."

Videos

Volga-Volga, Joseph Stalin's favourite film, with Orlova's solo lezginka and "death drop" (24:51)

Lyubov Orlova character teaching an Azerbaijani soldier about music's ability to communicate without words, in A Family, 1943 Baku Cinema Studio film banned by Stalin from theatrical release

== Filmography ==
Year	Title	Original Title	Role	Notes
1933	Alëna's Love	Любовь Алёны	Mrs Ellen Getwood, the wife of American engineer	silent film, lost
1934	A Petersburg Night	Петербургская ночь	Grushen’ka	music by Dmitry Kabalevsky
1934	Jolly Fellows	Весёлые ребята	Anyuta	music by Isaac Dunayevsky
1936	Circus	Цирк	Marion Dixon	music by Isaac Dunayevsky
1938	Volga-Volga	Волга-Волга	letter carrier Dunya Petrova ("Strelka")	music by Isaac Dunayevsky
1939	Engineer Kochin's Error	Ошибка инженера Кочина	Ksenia Lebedeva, employee of the Aviation Institute	
1940	Tanya	Светлый путь	Tanya Morozova "Cinderella"	music by Isaac Dunayevsky
1941	Fighting Film Collection #4	Боевой киносборник № 4	letter carrier Dunya Petrova ("Strelka"), presenter of the collection	
1941	The Artamonov Business	Дело Артамоновых	dancer Paula Menotti	cameo
1943	A Family	Одна семья	Katya	film wasn't released in theatres
1943	People of the Caspian	Каспийцы		documentary by Grigori Alexandrov
1947	Springtime	Весна	actress Vera Shatrova / scientist Irina Nikitina	music by Isaac Dunayevsky
1949	Encounter at the Elbe	Встреча на Эльбе	Jeannette Sherwood, journalist	music by Dmitry Shostakovich
1950	Mussorgsky	Мусоргский	Yuliya Platonova, opera singer of the Mariinsky Theater	music by Dmitry Kabalevsky
1952	Man of Music	Композитор Глинка	Lyudmila Ivanovna, sister of the composer	music by Vladimir Shcherbachov and Vissarion Shebalin
1960	Russian Souvenir	Русский сувенир	Varvara Komarova (Miss Barbara), engineer	music by Kirill Molchanov
1974	Starling and Lyre	Скворец и Лира	Lyudmila Grekova ("Lyre"), secret service agent	music by Oscar Feltsman

== Theatre roles ==
Stanislavski and Nemirovich-Danchenko Theatre

- 1926 — Hersillie, Babet (La fille de Madame Angot)
- 1927 — Georgette (Russian adaptation name)/ Virginie (The Italian Straw Hat)
- 1932 — Serpolette (Les cloches de Corneville)
- 1932 — La Périchole (La Périchole)

Mossovet Theatre

- 1947 — Jessie (The Russian Question by Konstantin Simonov)
- 1953 — Lydia (Somov and Others by Maxim Gorky)
- 1955 — Lizzie (Lizzie McKay / Russian adaptation of The Respectful Prostitute by Jean-Paul Sartre)
- 1958 — Nora (Nora / Russian adaptation of A Doll's House by Henrik Ibsen)
- 1963 — Patrick Campbell (Dear Liar by Jerome Kilty)
- 1972 — Ethel Savage (Strange Mrs Savage / Russian adaptation of The Curious Savage by John Patrick)

== Popular songs ==
- From Jolly Fellows (1934)
  - "Anyuta's song"
  - "Such a lot of nice girls", featuring on Leonid Utesov performance
  - "Tyuh-tyuh" ("Our iron is on fire...", Разгорелся наш утюг), trio with Leonid Utesov and Fyodor Kurikhin
- From Circus (1936):
  - "Song on a Cannon" ("Mary believes in miracles...")
  - "Moonlight Waltz"
  - "Lullaby"
  - "Song of the Motherland"
- From Volga-Volga (1938):
  - "Song about the Volga"
  - "Youth" (Молодёжная), noted for its similarity to a 1950s song "If You're Happy and You Know It"
- From Tanya (1940)
  - "Song-Bird", featuring on Elizaveta Antonova performance
  - "Chastushkas", with vocal trio Abramyan-Dmitrieva-Anikeeva
  - "Enthusiasts' March"
- From Fighting Film Collection No. 4 (1941)
  - "March of the Jolly Fellows (Military)"
- From Springtime (1947)
  - "Spring is coming"

According to the official credits, all the music is by Isaak Dunayevsky Lyubov Orlova had been systematically trained as a pianist from 1907 to 1922 (with 3 courses at the Moscow Conservatory), and, from 1920 to 1926, she worked professionally as a musician. In 1961, Orlova strongly implied her collaborative efforts in songwriting weren't credited, highly likely, because of the strict rules about the non-members of the Union of Soviet Composers. There is a story about a conversation between Dunaevsky (nicknamed Dunya) and Dmitry Shostakovich: Dunaevsky to Shostakovich: "You and me, Mitya, are the most popular composers". "Yes, Dunya", Shostakovich answers. "The only difference is that everyone knows my name but no one knows a single note of mine. Just like everyone knows your tunes but nobody knows who they belong to..."

== Legacy ==
"Russian Idol of the 20th Century" VCIOM Polls
Name	1999	2010
Yuri Gagarin (1934—1968)	30	35
Vladimir Vysotsky (1938—1980)	31	31
Georgy Zhukov (1896—1974)	26	20
Leo Tolstoy (1828—1910)	16	17
Joseph Stalin (1878—1953)	14	16
Alexander Solzhenitsyn (1918—2008)	16	14
Vladimir Lenin (1870—1924)	16	13
Andrey Sakharov (1921—1989)	26	12
Andrey Mironov (1941—1987)	20	12
Mikhail Bulgakov (1891—1940)	7	10
Mikhail Sholokhov (1905—1984)	7	9
Irina Rodnina (b. 1949)	7	9
Anton Chekhov (1860—1904)	6	8
Maya Plisetskaya (1925—2015)	7	8
Lyubov Orlova	10	7
Lev Yashin (1929—1990)	8	6
Fyodor Shalyapin (1873—1938)	7	5
Vasily Chapaev (1887—1919)	6	4
Dmitry Shostakovich (1906—1975)	3	4
Ilya Repin (1844—1930)	3	3
Mikhail Gorbachev (b. 1931)	7	3
Joseph Brodsky (1940—1996)	2	2
others	1	2
find it difficult to answer	4	9

A minor planet, 3108 Lyubov, discovered by Soviet astronomer Lyudmila Zhuravlyova in 1972, is named after her. A cruise ship named after her was built by the Soviet Union in Yugoslavia in 1976 for expeditions to Antarctica and the Arctic Circle.

In a 1999 VCIOM poll, Orlova was voted as the greatest "Russian Idol of the 20th Century" by 10%, the highest-rated woman, and 10th place overall with Yuri Gagarin atop with 30%. Ten years later, in 2010, she finished 3rd with 7% of votes, behind figure-skater Irina Rodnina (9%) and ballerina Maya Plisetskaya (8%) only, on a 15th place overall with Yuri Gagarin atop with 35%.

In 2016, a monument of Orlova in Zvenigorod was established near the Lyubov Orlova Cultural Centre (est. 2007).

In 2019, she was featured as a Google Doodle on what would have been her 117th birthday.

Influential roles

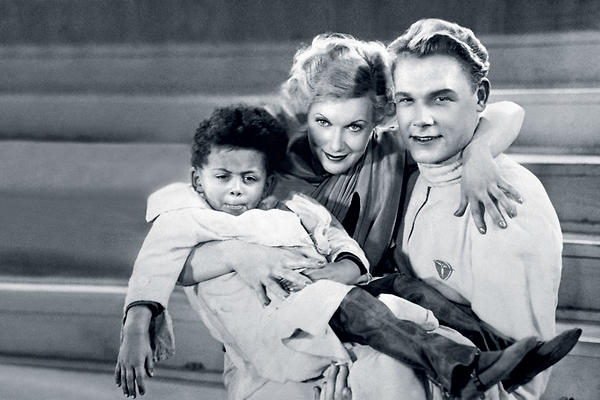
According to the official art history version, the unfading controversial film Circus had inspired Vera Mukhina to create the sculpture Worker and Kolkhoz Woman (1937), especially the male part played by Orlova's partner Sergei Stolyarov, 10 years younger than Orlova.

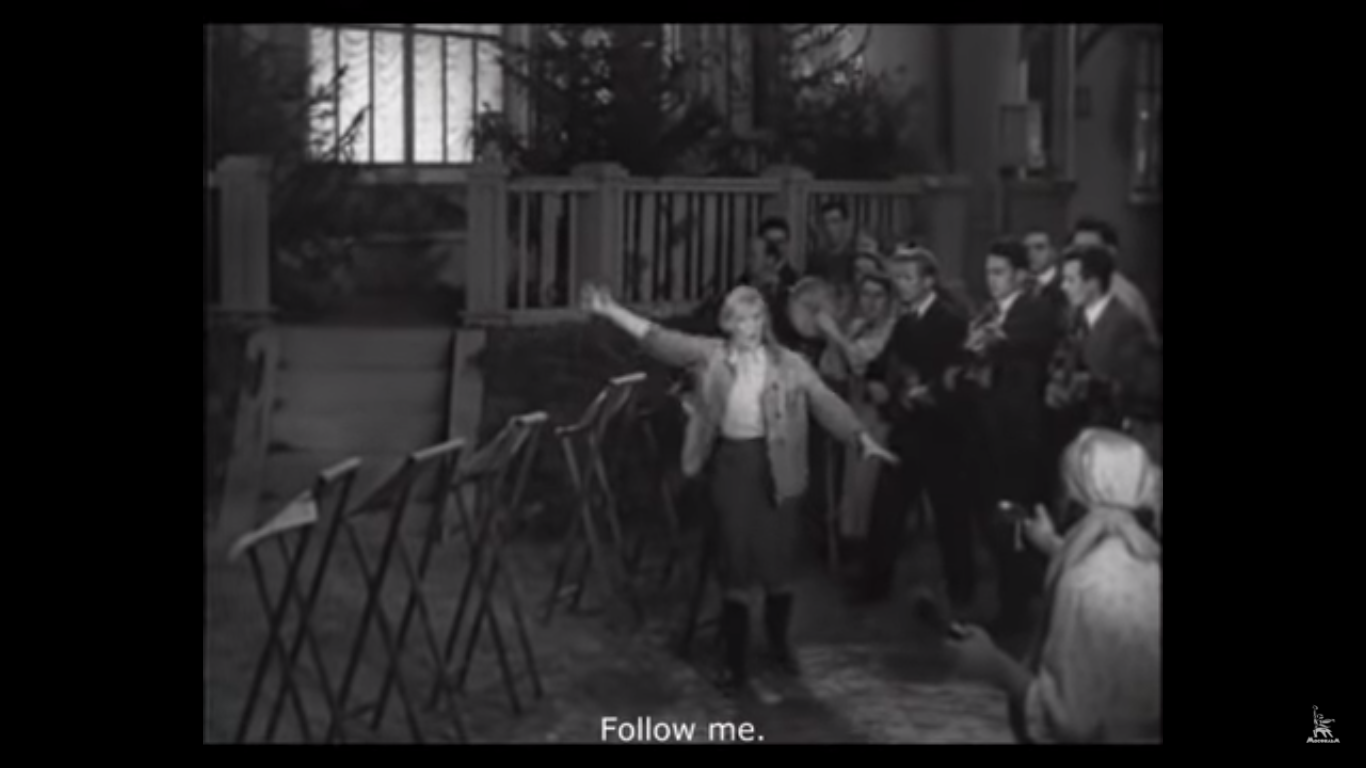
Lyubov Orlova character screams "Follow Me" (За мной!) in Volga-Volga (1938). Despite rumors, it has no direct connection to The Motherland Calls monument apart from the propaganda poster "Fascism is the most vicious enemy of women. All rise to fight fascism!", as according to the official Soviet art history version. Just like Orlova, as "a symbol of totalitarism", the 1967 statue was also criticised as "an empty and inhuman display of Stalinist kitsch".

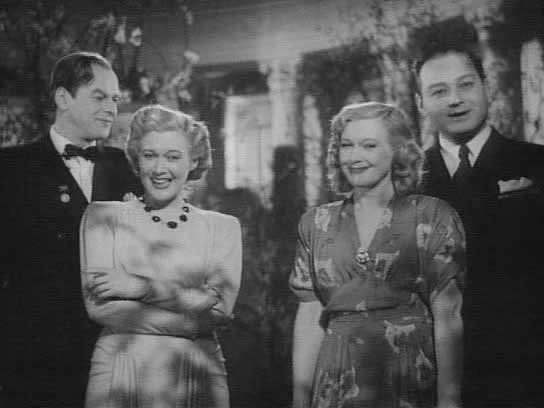
Orlova's two title roles, a famous female scientist and an actress, in Springtime (1947). In 1990s, it was revisited by the German critic Uve Schpilman as "a forerunner of postmodernism". Other critics argue the movie is an undoubted harbinger of F. Fellini's 8 1/2, films by Antonioni and Wenders. The first film to use Mukhina's most famous statue as an official Mosfilm logo.

=== Contradictory facts ===
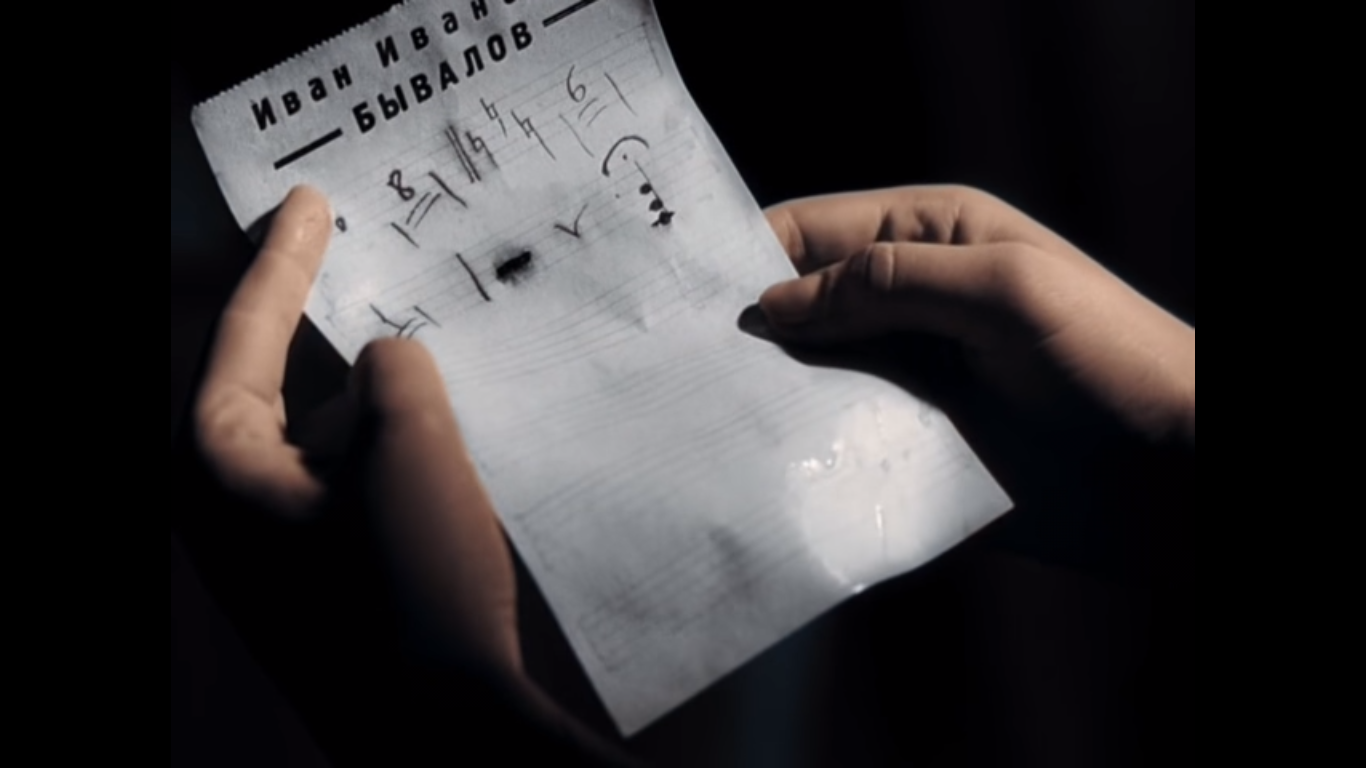
Lyubov Orlova's crippled hands in Volga-Volga with a classical 6th chord sheet

Lyubov Orlova didn't provide any information about her personal life during her rare interviews, and there were no yellow journalism in the USSR or tabloids that could have revealed a piece of dangerous information about her non-proletarian background and first marriage to Andrei Berzin, Gulag prisoner. According to her unpublished autobiography, she was accepted, at the age of seven, at the Yaroslavl Music College and her education at the Moscow Conservatory had started before 1919. Orlova wrote: "Before 1919, I studied piano at the Moscow Conservatory, Profs. A. P. Ostrovskaya and K. A. Kipp. And, probably, my parents were slightly disappointed when it turned out the art form I've mastered didn't give me a great success, or recognition, or fame, but... just a modest opportunity to accompany the films that were shown in cinema with my piano playing". The official Moscow Conservatory cites 1919 as a year of start for her studies with Kipp and explains Orlova's drop: "...due to the difficult financial situation, her conservatory studies weren't completed". Other biographies, including her grandniece's book, also don't mention Orlova's rare Ménière's disease as a reason for the career focus change.

In March 2016, the Channel One TV-series Orlova and Alexandrov was released. In this biopic, Lyubov Orlova has graduated from Moscow Conservatory, Prof. Aleksandr Goldenweiser. The series also implies, through an explicit display of that kind of torture on a female character, Orlova's music hands, her right hand especially, were seriously damaged during Cheka, or OGPU (the previous titles for NKVD) tortures for interrogation. However, the official profile of Prof. Kipp lists Lybov Orlova (as a famous actress) among the best of his students, just like Prof. Ostrovskaya's (junior courses). Another biography, the 1987 Lyubov Orlova in Art and Life book, listed her as a conservatory graduate with Prof. Felix Blumenfeld as her senior piano class teacher, in addition to Kipp. Blumenfeld began his Moscow Conservatory career in 1922.

A source of Orlova's pre-conservatory music education isn't clear. Yaroslavl Music College was founded in 1904 on a foundation of the existing Yaroslavl Russian Musical Society classes. Education at the conservatory during the Civil War was provided as usual, even in unheated classrooms. Since July 1918, the education at Moscow Conservatory has become state-sponsored, free of charge for domestic students. The full training period was 9 years, junior department from I to V course, and senior department from VI to IX course, and the minimum age of enrollment was 10 years. From 1910 till his death in 1925, Prof. Kipp taught at the senior department.

According to Orlova-Aleksandrov's archive holder, layer Aleksander Dobrovinsky, Orlova was voluntarily childless. Dobrovinsky said: "I've found her correspondence with a professor, gynecologist No. 1 in the USSR. There are mainly things of a physiological nature, but they indicate that Lyubov Orlova, one of the first women in the USSR, had inserted a spiral or something like that for contraception.

Lyubov Orlova's year of birth was debatable. Her only friend Faina Ranevskaya stated: "Nobody will say how old she is. She is generally brilliant: when they issued passports in the early thirties, no documents were required. You could name any date of birth and any name too ... So Lyubochka did not lose her head and immediately knocked off a dozen years! It was me, the idiot, who hesitated: is it worth it? Then I calculated that I have spent two years at resorts, so the resorts, as they say, do not count, and a new date of birth has appeared in my passport: instead of 1895, 1897. So little that I still cannot forgive myself for such frivolity!" According to Lyubov Orlova's grandniece Nonna Golikova, her grandmother Nonna Orlova (1897-1960), was "two or three years older" than her famous sister. Lyubov Orlova's mother, Evgenia Sukhotina, has changed her passport year of birth from 1863 to 1878, 'nullifying' fifteen years.

Mutually exclusive facts before 1926
Data	Autobiography	Posthumous biographies	RIA Novosti biography	F. Ranevskaya
Year of birth	—	1902	1902	1892, "minus 10 years to the official", probably a joke referencing Orlova's years of music training)
Education: Music College (School)	Yaroslavl Music College (est. 1904) (enrolled through a competition at 7; after 2 years of domestic music education provided by her mother) (Note: 'училище', as school (college))	1909	Music school since 7, as her parents' demand	—
Education: Gymnasium	Music school (Note: 'школа' as 'school' (school) she also calls 'училище' in the same paragraph, she also credits it for 'secret from parents, ballet studies')	1910–1917, Moscow (Note: Kiriena Konstantinovna Alelekova Gymnasium, loc. Moscow, Bolshaya Nikitskaya st., 46. Orlova wasn't good at science and didn't receive the excellence certificate)	Moscow secondary school, graduated in 1919	—
Job: Sale of Milk	—	1917–1919, with her family, she moved to Svatovo, Voskresensky district (Note: During the Civil War, Orlova has injured her hands carrying heavy milk cans to Moscow for sale, in any weather conditionts, for several years. The fact makes her Moscow Conservatory (piano department) enrollment impossible.)	—	—
Education: Moscow Conservatory	Before 1919	1919—1922	1919—1922	—
Job: Musical Illustrator in Cinema Theatre	Start in 1922, her first job	1920–1926, in Zvenigorod and Moscow	As a part-time job during her studies at Moscow Theater College	—
Education: Choreography	Start in 1922, choreographic department of the Moscow Theater College named after A.V. Lunacharsky.	1922–1925, Francesca Beata Studio (since 1924, merged into the choreographic department of the Moscow Theater College named after A.V. Lunacharsky she has graduated in 1925)	1922–1925, Moscow Theater College	—
Education: Acting	Start in 1922, private lessons from Elizaveta Teleshova.	1922–1925, private lessons from Elizaveta Telesheva (Note: Elizaveta Teleshova (1892-1943) was an actress and director of the Moscow Art Theater and a close friend of Sergei Eisenstein.)	—	—
Job: Music Teacher	—	1924–1926, private lessons	—	—

== Gallery ==
Photos

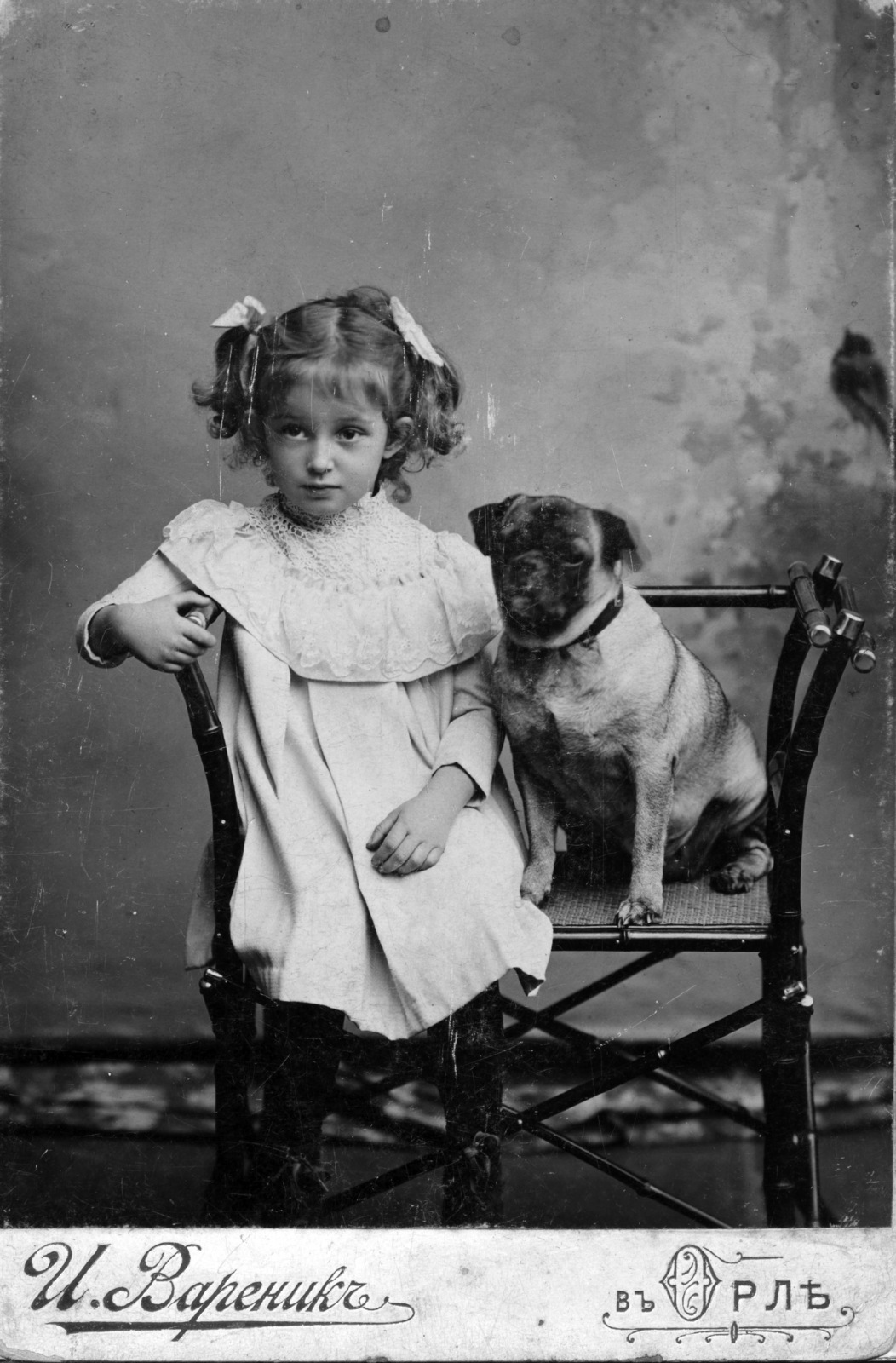
Lyubov Orlova in 1904

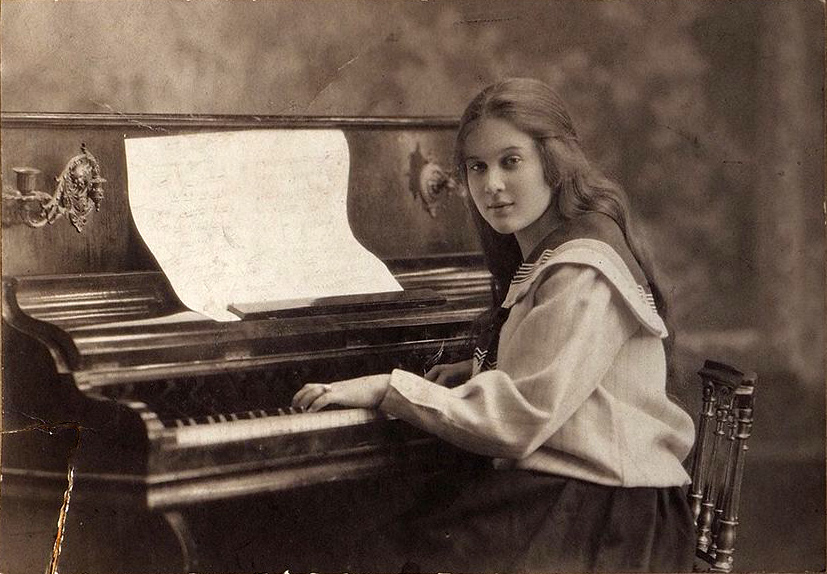
Lyubov Orlova in 1916

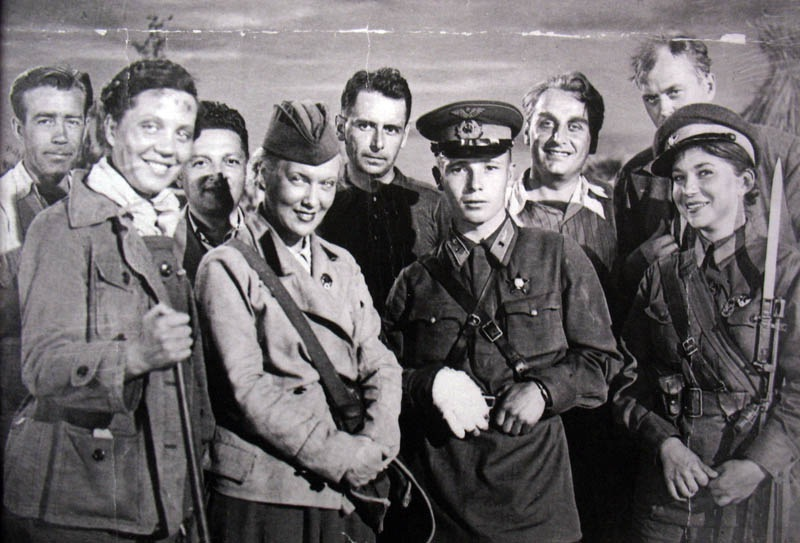
During the filming of Fighting Film Collection #4 in August 1941. Orlova is standing next to Viktor Talalikhin.

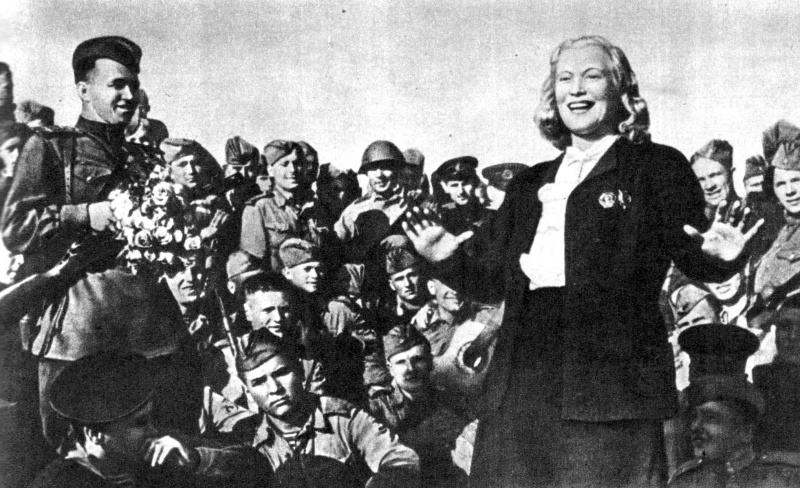
Singing for the Soviet soldiers during WWII

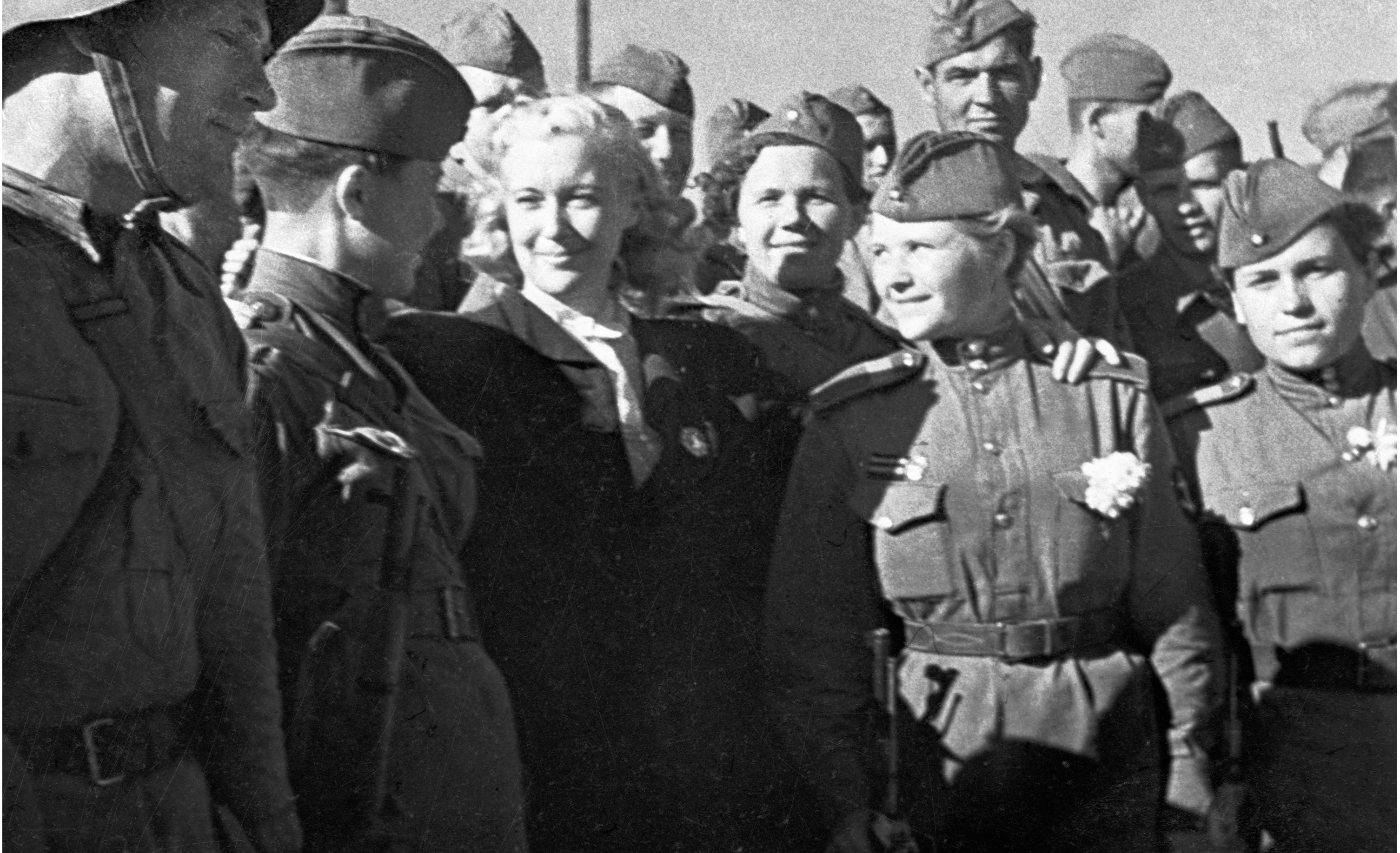
Lyubov Orlova sees off Soviet troops departing to the front
Commemorative items

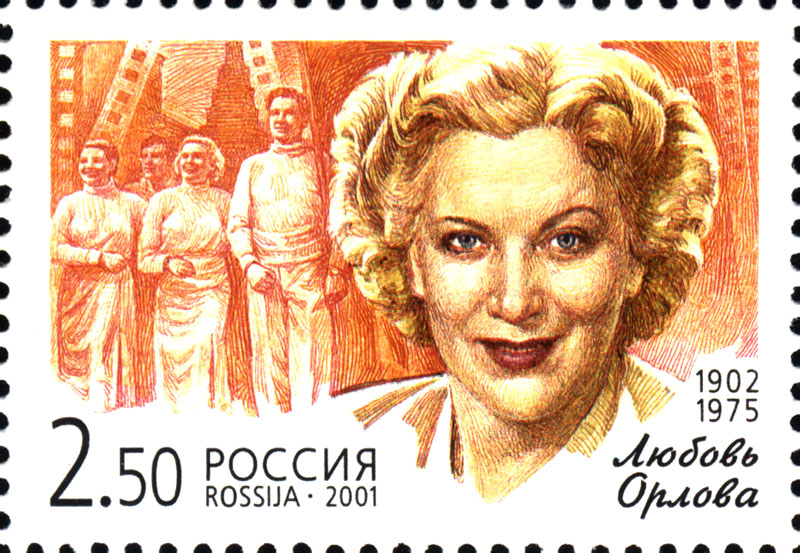
Postage Stamp, Russia, 2001

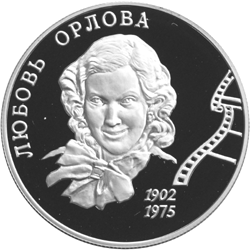
2002, Bank of Russia, Series: "Outstanding Personalities of Russia", 100th Anniversary

== See also ==
- MV Lyubov Orlova
- Cinema of the Soviet Union
