= A Petersburg Night =

- Actress Ksenia Tarasova in a scene from the film
- Russian: Петербургская ночь
- Directed by: Grigori Roshal; Vera Stroyeva
- Written by: Serafima Roshal; Vera Stroyeva
- Starring: Lyubov Orlova; Boris Dobronravov; Kseniya Tarasova; Anatoliy Goryunov; Lev Fenin
- Cinematography: Dmitriy Feldman
- Music by: Dmitri Kabalevsky
- Production company: Moskinokombinat
- Release date: 1934
- Running time: 106 minutes
- Country: Soviet Union
- Language: Russian

A Petersburg Night (Russian: Петербургская ночь) is a 1934 Soviet drama film directed by Grigori Roshal and Vera Stroyeva, loosely based on Fyodor Dostoevsky’s novel Netochka Nezvanova and short story "White Nights". The film debut of actress Lyubov Orlova, the future star of Soviet cinema.

== Plot ==
The story follows Yegor Yefimov, a gifted self-taught violinist and former serf, who is freed by his landowner, Velemirov, and sets out for Saint Petersburg in pursuit of true art and professional musical training. On his way, Yefimov becomes stranded in a provincial town and takes a job at the local theater. There, he meets Schults, a diligent and disciplined violinist determined to succeed in music through hard work. One day, Yefimov abruptly leaves the theater and continues on foot to Petersburg. However, the cold and bureaucratic nature of the city quickly shatters his illusions.

== Cast ==
- Lyubov Orlova as Grushenka
- Boris Dobronravov as violinist Yegor Yefimov
- Kseniya Tarasova as Nastenka
- Anatoliy Goryunov as Schults
- Lev Fenin as Landlord Velemirov
- Igor Doronin as Student
- Ivan Kudryavtsev as weaver Ivan Vasilyev
- Sergei Vecheslov as Tavern guest
- Antonin Pankryshev as Gendarm
- Leonid Yurenev as His Excellency
