= Encounter at the Elbe =

1949 film by Grigori Aleksandrov

- Directed by: Grigori Aleksandrov
- Written by: Lev Sheynin; Leonid Tur; Pyotr Tur
- Starring: Vladlen Davydov; Konstantin Nassonov; Boris Andreyev; Lyubov Orlova; Mikhail Nazvanov
- Cinematography: Eduard Tisse
- Music by: Dmitri Shostakovich
- Production company: Mosfilm
- Release date: 1949
- Running time: 104 min.
- Country: Soviet Union
- Language: Russian

Encounter at the Elbe (Russian: Встреча на Эльбе, romanized: Vstrecha na Elbe) is a Soviet war film released in 1949 from Mosfilm, describing the conflict, spying, and collaboration between the Soviet Army advancing from the east and the U.S. Army advancing from the west. The two allied forces met each other for the first time on the River Elbe near the end of the World War II. This meeting occurred on April 25, 1945, which was usually remembered as “Elbe Day” in Western Bloc nations and as the "Encounter at the Elbe” in Eastern Bloc nations.

The film was directed by Grigori Aleksandrov, with music by Dmitri Shostakovich, which included “Yearning for the Homeland” (in Russian: Тоска по родине, the words by Yevgeny Dolmatovsky), that became popular at that time in the Eastern Bloc nations and among the leftists in the Western Bloc nations, including Japan.

== Plot ==
In April 1945, in the German town of Altenstadt, divided by the Elbe River, advancing Soviet forces meet U.S. troops. The eastern part of the town joins the Soviet occupation zone, while the western part is occupied by the Americans. The commanders of the Soviet and American sectors, Major Kuzmin and Major James Hill (a former schoolteacher before the war), maintain cordial relations as good neighbors. However, tensions rise as the Cold War begins to unfold.

General-businessman MacDermott organizes a systematic plundering of the territory occupied by the Allies, while in the Soviet sector, efforts are made to alleviate the suffering of the war-torn German civilians.

The town's mayor, distrustful of the Russians, flees from the eastern part to the western sector. However, outraged by the social and racial injustices in the American zone, he returns.

Meanwhile, in the Soviet occupation zone, a Nazi conspiracy organized by the Americans is uncovered. James Hill attempts to thwart the Nazis, remembering that they share a common enemy, but encounters a CIA emissary — a woman posing as a journalist. After the failure of the operation, she leaves Germany, promising Hill she will make him "a real American."

In the finale, Hill, now demoted, meets Kuzmin on a bridge over the Elbe; however, the bridge is symbolically razed.

== Cast ==
- Vladlen Davydov – Major (later Colonel) Kuzmin, Soviet military commander
- Konstantin Nassonov – Maslov, military council member
- Boris Andreyev – Sergeant Yegorkin
- Lyubov Orlova – Journalist Janet Sherwood, an American agent
- Mikhail Nazvanov – Gen. James Hill
- Ivan Lyubeznov – Sergeant Harry Perebeynoga
- Vladimir Vladislavsky – General McDermot
- Faina Ranevskaya – Mrs. McDermot
- Andrei Petrov – Soviet officer
- Andrei Fajt – Nazi Schrank, hiding under the name of anti-fascist Krause
- Yuri Yurovsky – Professor Otto Dietrich
- Gennady Yudin – Kurt Dietrich
- Erast Garin – Captain Tommy
- Sergei Tsenin – Senator Woody
- Viktor Kulakov – Ernst Shmetau
- Lidiya Sukharevskaya – Elsa Shmetau
- Nikolai Nikitich – Schultz
- Rina Zelyonaya – female German with a bicycle
- Harijs Avens – American
- Yevgeny Kaluzhsky – General at the Embassy (uncredited)
- Mikhail Vorobyov – episode (uncredited)

== See also ==
- Second World War
- Eastern Front (World War II)
- Elbe Day
- Charles Thau
