= Engineer Kochin's Error =

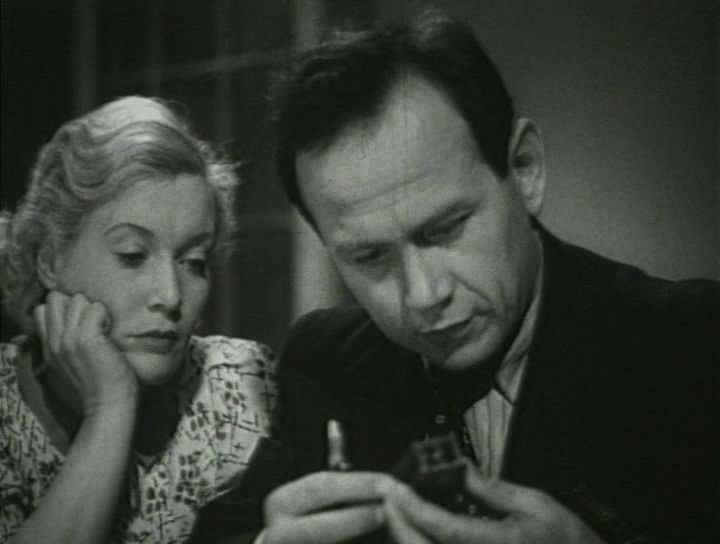
- Russian: Ошибка инженера Кочина
- Directed by: Aleksandr Macheret
- Written by: Aleksandr Macheret; Yury Olesha
- Starring: Mikhail Zharov; Sergey Nikonov; Lyubov Orlova; Nikolai Dorokhin; Boris Petker
- Cinematography: Igor Gelein
- Release date: 1939
- Country: Soviet Union
- Language: Russian

Engineer Kochin's Error, (Russian: Ошибка инженера Кочина) is a 1939 Soviet thriller directed by Aleksandr Macheret.

The film tells the story of how an aircraft engineer's decision to take classified blueprints home unravels a deadly web of espionage, betrayal, and intrigue in late 1930s Moscow.

== Plot ==
The story is set in late 1930s Moscow. An aircraft design engineer at an aviation plant, Kochin, makes the mistake of taking classified blueprints home to quickly revise them based on recent test results. Murzin, the head of the department, does not explicitly forbid the act but also fails to authorize it. Unbeknownst to Kochin, Murzin is an informant for a foreign intelligence agency and immediately alerts his handler, Trivosh.

With the help of Kochin’s neighbor and romantic interest, Ksenia Lebedeva, Trivosh breaks into the engineer’s room and photographs the blueprints.

The transmission of the spy's encoded message, urging the urgent smuggling of the photographs abroad, occurs in a tailor's workshop, a meeting spot chosen by the agents. However, Murzin accidentally drops the coded note. The tailor, finding the suspicious scrap of paper, promptly hands it over to the NKVD. Investigators decode the message, and detective Lartsev begins an investigation.

Kochin and Ksenia go on a stroll in Pushkino, unaware they are being followed by Trivosh. During the outing, Ksenia confesses to Kochin that she is a spy but promises to cooperate with the authorities.

Trivosh eliminates Ksenia by pushing her under a train, but state security operatives manage to apprehend the spies before they can escape.

== Cast ==
- Mikhail Zharov as Lartsev
- Sergey Nikonov
- Lyubov Orlova as Kseniya Lebedeva
- Nikolai Dorokhin as Kochin
- Boris Petker
- Faina Ranevskaya
- Leonid Kmit
- Pyotr Leontyev as Galkin
