= Springtime (1947 film) =

1947 film by Grigori Aleksandrov

- Directed by: Grigori Aleksandrov
- Written by: Grigori Aleksandrov; Moris Slobodskoy; Aleksandr Raskin
- Starring: Lyubov Orlova; Nikolay Cherkasov; Faina Ranevskaya
- Cinematography: Yuri Yekelchik
- Music by: Isaak Dunayevsky
- Production company: Mosfilm
- Release date: July 2, 1947
- Running time: 102 min.
- Country: Soviet Union
- Language: Russian

Springtime (Russian: Весна, romanized: Vesna) is a 1947 Soviet musical-comedy film directed by Grigori Aleksandrov and starring Lyubov Orlova, Nikolay Cherkasov and Faina Ranevskaya.

== Plot ==
Director Arkady Gromov decides to make a film about the life of scientists, presenting them as grim hermits detached from life, completely immersed in research. As a prototype, the director decides to use a real scientist – Irina Nikitina, director of the Sun Institute. For the role of "Nikitina", Gromov finds Vera Shatrova, a young operetta actress who is an exact mirror image of her character.

Not wanting to interrupt her work in the operetta, Shatrova meets Nikitina and asks her for the time being to double for her on the set. Thus Nikitina for the first time gets to know director Gromov and the screenplay of the future film about scientists. She strongly opposes Gromov's views about the scientific world and explains to the director the errors of his outlook. In turn, Nikitina sees how complex and painstaking the work of filmmakers is. Because of the "swap", Nikitina and Shatrova get into many absurd situations but at the end of the film all is resolved swimmingly.

== Cast ==
- Lyubov Orlova – Prof. Irina Petrovna Nikitina / Vera Giorgievna Shatrova, actress
- Nikolay Cherkasov – Arkadi Mikhailovich Gromov, director
- Faina Ranevskaya – Margarita Lvovna, Nikitina's housekeeper
- Rostislav Plyatt – Vladimir Ivanovich Bubentsov, sciolist, Margarita Lvovna's admirer
- Nikolai Konovalov – Leonid Maksimovich Mukhin, director assistant
- Tatyana Guretskaya – Tatyana Ivanovna, director assistant
- Mikhail Sidorkin – Nikolai Semyenovich Roshchin, journalist
- Vasiliy Zaychikov – Prof. Ivan Nikolayevich Melnikov
- Boris Petker – Akeki Abramovich, theater director
- Rina Zelyonaya – gabby film makeup artist

== Filming ==
- The film marked the first appearance of the "Mosfilm" intro with the image of the famous sculpture "Worker and Kolkhoz Woman".
- The picture incorporates elements of science fiction: in the fictional Sun Institute Irina Nikitina leads the scientific research on the invention of liquid that can accumulate and send out solar energy, and in the finale Nikitina puts on a successful experiment.
- Filming took place in Czechoslovakia at the "Barrandov Studios" because "Mosfilm" was not yet fully restored after the war.
- In the 1950s, the film was subjected to the censorship: scenes were removed with the building carrying the name "Metropolitan Kaganovich" on one of the stations of the Moscow Metro. This was due to the expulsion of Lazar Kaganovich from the ranks of the ruling elite. In the 1986 "restored" version of the film these scenes have been re-added.
- "Irina Nikitina" actually does have an existing prototype - Zinaida Ershova, Doctor of Chemical Sciences.
- The oft-repeated phrase in the movie "The mass of the sun is two octillion tonnes" corresponds to scientific data.

== Awards ==
At the 8th Venice International Film Festival in 1947 Lyubov Orlova received a special prize for the best female acting. The film was also screened at the Mariánské Lázně International Film Festival in the same year and at the Locarno International Film Festival in July 1948.
