= Ranevskaya Monument =

Monument in Taganrog, Rostov, Russia

Coordinates: 47°12′38″N 38°56′01″E

Monument to Faina Ranevskaya
- Памятник Ф.Г.Раневской
- Interactive map of Monument to Faina Ranevskaya
- Location: Taganrog
- Designer: David Begalov
- Material: bronze
- Height: 215 cm (85 in)
- Completion date: 2008
- Opening date: May 16, 2008
- Dedicated to: Faina Ranevskaya

The Monument to Faina Ranevskaya, designed and sculpted by David Begalov, is located in front of Faina Ranevskaya's birth house in Taganrog, Russia.

Faina Ranevskaya (1896-1984) is recognized as one of the greatest comic actors of the 20th century. She was born on August 27 (August 15 - Old Style), 1896 in the city of Taganrog in the Nikolaevskaya street, 12 (now Frunze Street, 10).

August 29, 1986, a memorial plate dedicated to Ranevskaya was placed on her birth house in the city of Taganrog. Taganrog Local Government is planning to open a museum dedicated to Ranevskaya in the near future. A monument to Faina Ranevskaya (by the artist David Begalov) in front of the house was unveiled on May 16, 2008 within the framework of the First International Ranevskaya Drama Festival "The Great Province".

== Gallery ==
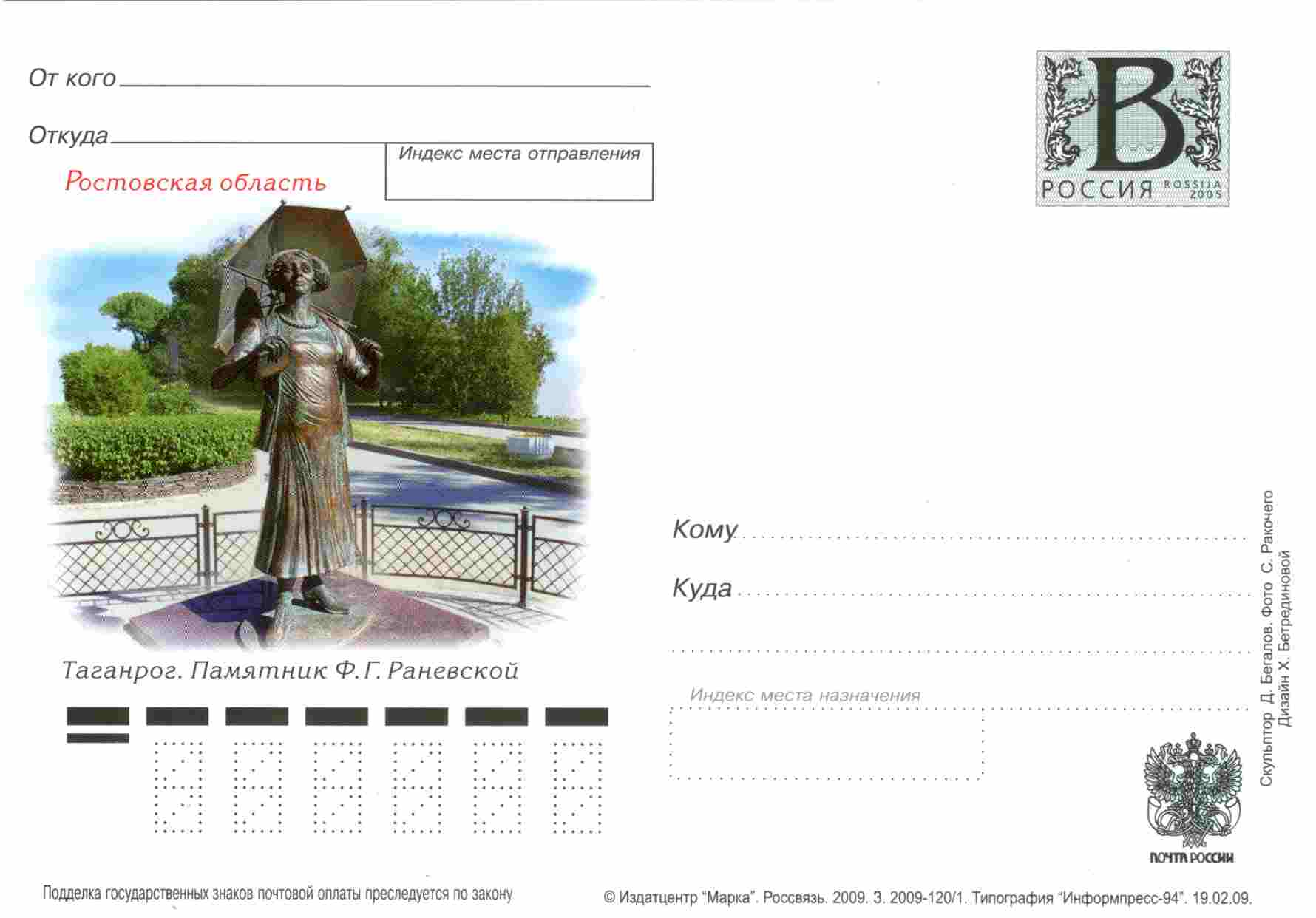
Monument to Ranevskaya in Taganrog featured on a postcard published by Marka Publishing House (Russian: Издательско-торговый центр «Марка») in Moscow in 2009.

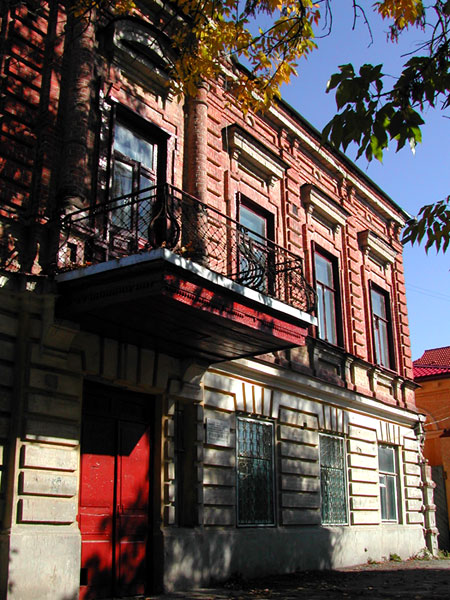
Birth house of Faina Ranevskaya on Frunze Street 10, Taganrog.
