= Jolly Fellows =

1934 film by Grigori Aleksandrov

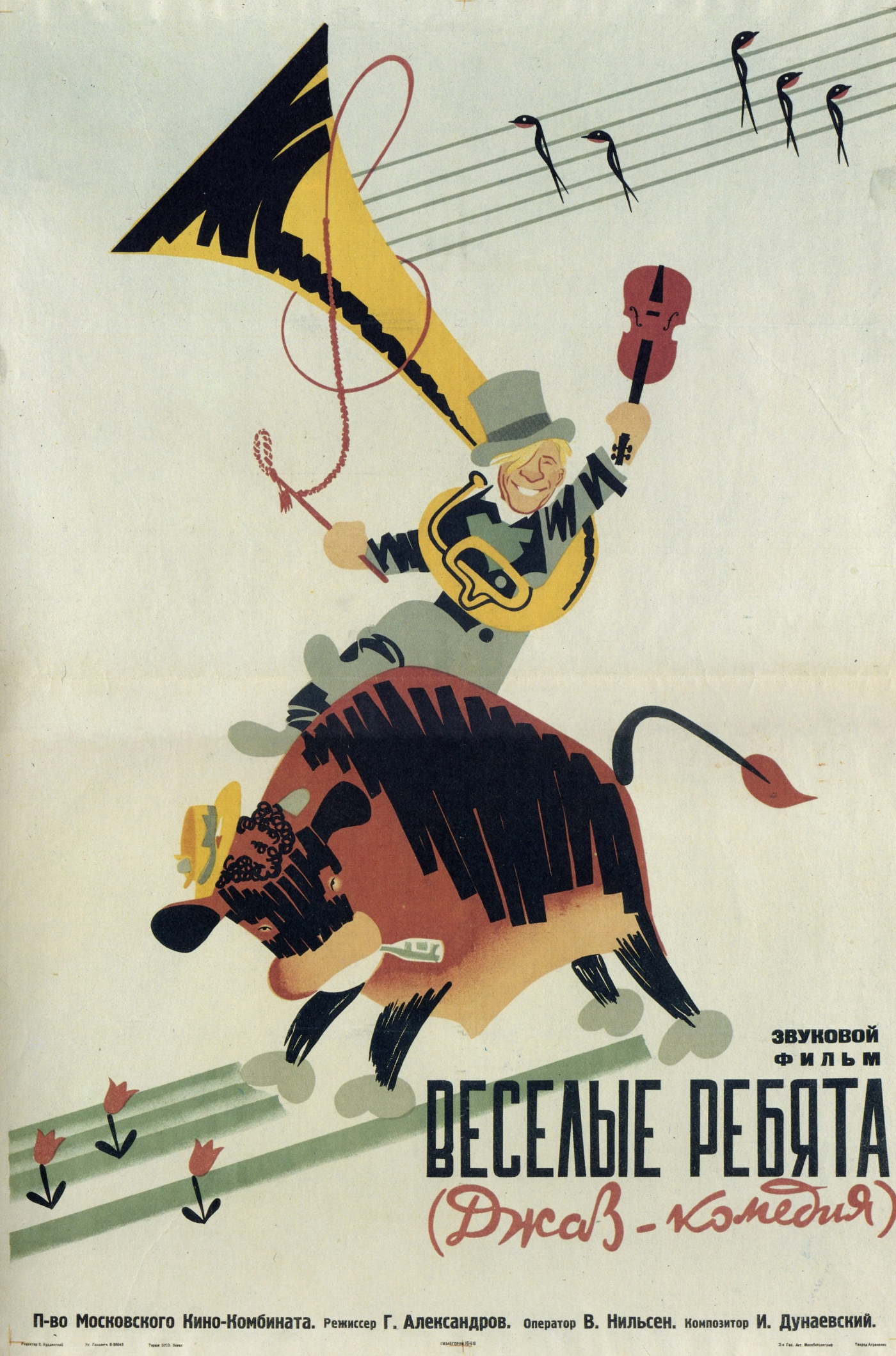
- Theatrical release poster
- Directed by: Grigori Aleksandrov
- Written by: Grigori Aleksandrov; Nikolai Erdman
- Starring: Lyubov Orlova; Leonid Utyosov
- Cinematography: Vladimir Nilsen
- Music by: Isaak Dunayevsky
- Production company: Mosfilm
- Release date: 1934
- Running time: 96 minutes
- Country: Soviet Union
- Language: Russian

Jolly Fellows (Russian: Весёлые ребята, romanized: Vesyolye rebyata), also translated as Happy-Go-Lucky Guys, Moscow Laughs and Jazz Comedy, is a 1934 Soviet musical film, directed by Grigori Aleksandrov and starring his wife Lyubov Orlova, a gifted singer and the first recognized star of Soviet cinema.

The script was written by Aleksandrov, Vladimir Mass, and Nikolai Erdman (whose father briefly appears on screen as a German music teacher). It features several songs which instantly became classics across the Soviet Union. The most famous song — "Kak mnogo devushek khoroshikh" (Such a lot of nice girls) — enjoyed international fame, covered as "Serdtse" (Heart) by Pyotr Leshchenko. Music was by Isaak Dunayevsky, the lyrics were written by the Soviet poet Vasily Lebedev-Kumach.

Both Orlova and her co-star, the jazz singer and comic actor Leonid Utyosov, were propelled to stardom after this movie.

== Plot ==
Jolly Fellows (1934)

Yelena (Mariya Strelkova), a wealthy aspiring singer who cannot carry a tune, mistakes shepherd Kostya Potekhin (Leonid Utyosov) for the famous Paraguayian conductor Costa Fraschini. She invites him to a lavish party at her house. Unaware of the misunderstanding, Kostya attends, bringing along his herd from the kolkhoz. His performance on the pan flute inadvertently summons the animals, who invade the dining area, causing chaos. Meanwhile, Yelena's maid, Anyuta (Lyubov Orlova), secretly falls in love with Kostya, but his attention is focused on Yelena. When Kostya's true identity is revealed, Yelena rejects him, and her mother expels him in anger. Heartbroken, Kostya leaves for the city to pursue a career as a professional musician.

In the city, Kostya faces a series of comedic misadventures as he tries to establish himself in the music world. He eventually joins a jazz band composed of vibrant and eccentric young musicians, the "jolly fellows." Leading the band proves challenging as Kostya must navigate creative differences and fiery tempers among his bandmates. Their rehearsals often spiral into heated arguments and brawls, resulting in them being evicted by their landlord. Forced to practice wherever they can, the band even resorts to performing at funerals for extra rehearsal time. Despite the setbacks, Kostya’s determination helps the band grow into a cohesive group.

On a rainy evening, Kostya and his bandmates cross paths with Anyuta, who has made her way to the city. They invite her to join them on their way to a concert, where her exceptional singing talent is revealed. She becomes a key member of the band, and together they begin to achieve success, blending their talents and passion for music. As the "jolly fellows" rise to prominence, Kostya and Anyuta's connection deepens, paving the way for a joyful and harmonious future.

== Contemporary criticism ==
Graham Greene, in his 26 September 1935 review for The Spectator, wrote that it "is the best thing that has happened to the cinema since René Clair made The Italian Straw Hat. Alexandrov, who has been awarded a Soviet Order for his direction, has produced, just as Clair did then, out of the smallest resources and apparently with poor-quality film, a picture of almost ecstatic happiness. ... I have no wish to criticise this film, but simply to rejoice in its wildness, its grotesqueness, its light, taking tunes, a sense of good living that owes nothing to champagne or women's clothes."

Film critic Jean Ross — writing as Peter Porcupine in her 1 October 1935 review for The Daily Worker — effusively praised the film: "The workers in the Soviet Union have introduced to the world an entirely new sort of humour... behind the comedy of Jazz Comedy is no dismal shadow of tragedy, but the electrifying strength and vitality and freedom of a victorious working class."

== Influence ==
The film was enormously successful in the Soviet Union. It had a small impact much later in Australia after it was shown in 1964 at the Australia Cinema in Melbourne and the name "The Jolly Fellows" was used for over a decade thereafter by a small jazz band after the original members, David Meadows, Keith Morgan and Pete Bannister, high school friends and then all aged 19, had seen and enjoyed the film.

== Cast ==
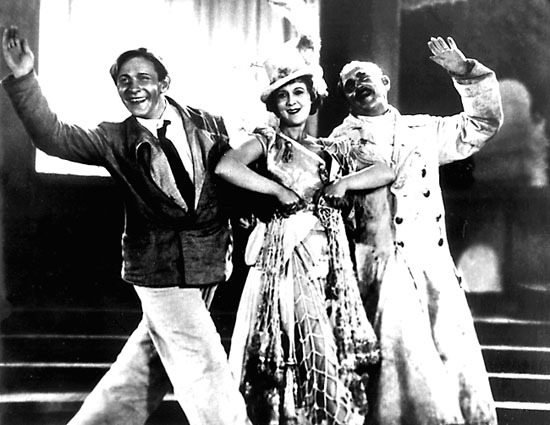

- Leonid Utesov as Konstantin Ivanovich "Kostya" Potekhin, a shepherd and amateur musician
- Lyubov Orlova as Anyuta, a housekeeper
- Maria Strelkova as Elena, the child of Torgsin
- Elena Tyapkina as Elena's mother
- Fyodor Kurikhin as torchbearer
- Robert Erdman as Karl Ivanovich, music teacher
- Arnold Arnold as Gustav Fraschini, conductor from Paraguay
- Emmanuel Geller as a spectator who, instead of a stage, looked with loving eyes at a friend whose shoes were pinching
- Sergey Kashtelyan as musician, instigator of a fight at a rehearsal
- Nikolai Otto as musician, instigator of a fight at a rehearsal
- Alexander Kostomolotsky as musician
- Valentin Parnakh
