= Andrei Berzin =

Soviet politician (1893–1951)

- Andrejs Bērziņš
- Born: 21 January 1893; Majorenhof, Governorate of Livonia, Russian Empire
- Died: 1951 (aged 57–58); Latvian SSR, USSR

Academic work
- School or tradition: Marxian economics

Andrei Gasparovich Berzin (Russian: Андрей Гаспарович Берзин, Latvian: Andrejs Bērziņš; January 23, 1893, Majorenhof, Governorate of Livonia — 1951, Latvian SSR) was a Soviet politician.

After the Russian Civil War Berzin remained in Soviet Russia, where he worked as deputy head of the administrative and financial department of the People's Commissariat of Agriculture.

In 1930, along with other economists Nikolai Kondratiev, Alexander Chayanov and Lev Litoshenko he was arrested by Cheka in the case of the so-called Labor Peasant Party. In 1931, Berzin was exiled to Kazakhstan, where he worked as an economist-planner at Soyuzpromkorm.

In 1938, during the Latvian Operation of the NKVD Berzin was arrested again and imprisoned in a Gulag correctional labour camp until the end of World War II, after which he was released and allowed to return to Moscow.

First husband of actress Lyubov Orlova (1926—1930). After the arrest, the actress did not know anything about his fate. According to the biographers, while already being a wife of Grigory Alexandrov, she had asked Stalin to find out about Berzin and help him.

Berzin died in 1951 from cancer in Latvia, where he was living with his relatives.
