= Leonid Utesov =

Soviet singer (1895–1982)

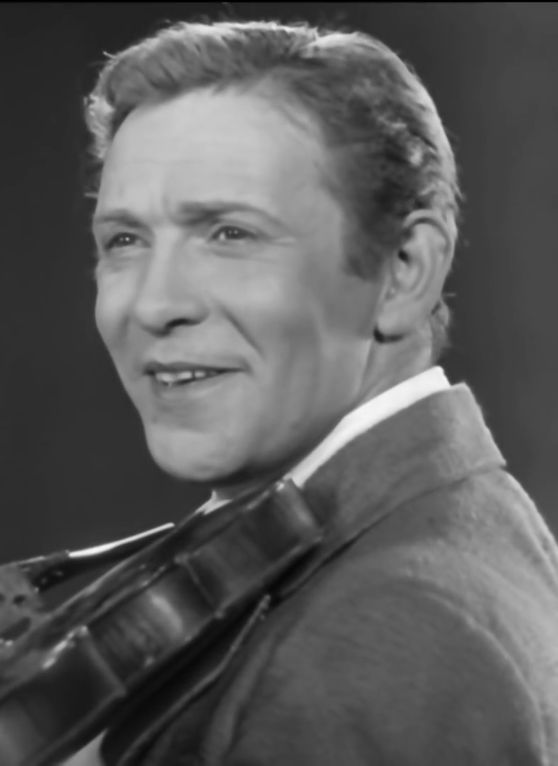
- Utesov in Jolly Fellows (1934)
- Born: Leyzer (Lazar) Vaysbeyn; 21 March 1895; Odessa, Russian Empire
- Died: 10 March 1982 (aged 86); Moscow, Russian SFSR, Soviet Union
- Resting place: Novodevichy Cemetery, Moscow
- Occupations: Singer, actor, conductor
- Title: People's Artist of the USSR (1965)
- Musical career
- Genres: Estrada; Folk; Russian romance; Pop
- Instrument: Vocals

Leonid Osipovich Utesov, also spelled Utyosov or Utiosov (Note: (Russian: Леонид Осипович Утёсов, Ukrainian: Леонід Йосипович Утьосов)), born Lazar (Leyzer) Iosifovich Vaysbeyn or Weissbein (Note: (Лазарь (Лейзер) Иосифович Вайсбейн))) (21 March [O.S. 9 March] 1895, Odessa – 10 March 1982, Moscow), was a famous Soviet estrada singer, and comic actor, who became the first pop singer to be awarded the prestigious title of People's Artist of the USSR in 1965.

== Biography ==
Leonid Utesov was brought up in Odessa, Russian Empire and attended the Faig School of Commerce, from which he dropped out and joined the Borodanov Circus troupe as an acrobat. He started his stage career in 1911 in Kremenchuk, then returned to Odessa, changed his artistic name to Leonid Utesov, and performed as a stand up comedian with the Rosanov troupe and with the Rishelyavsky Theatre. In 1917, he won a singing competition in Gomel, Belarus, then performed in Moscow.

In the 1920s, he moved to Leningrad and set up one of the first Soviet jazz bands. In Leningrad, he began collaboration with the popular composer, Isaak Dunayevsky, which turned out to be a breakthrough for both artists. At that time, Utesov built a band of the finest musicians available in Leningrad, and created a style all his own – a jazz show with stand up comedy, which blended several styles, ranging from Russian folk songs to a variety of international cosmopolitan genres. In 1928, Utesov toured Europe and attended performances of American jazz bands in Paris, which influenced his own style. During the 1930s, Utesov and his band, called "Thea-Jazz" (a portmanteau of Theatrical Jazz) had a regular gig at the Marble Hall of the Kirov Palace of Culture in Leningrad. Utesov's jazz band also performed at the Leningrad Maly Opera theatre, at the "Svoboda-teatr," and at the Leningrad Music Hall. In his performances, Utesov delivered a variety of musical styles, including such genres as American jazz, Argentine tango, French chanson, upbeat dance, and Russian folk music.

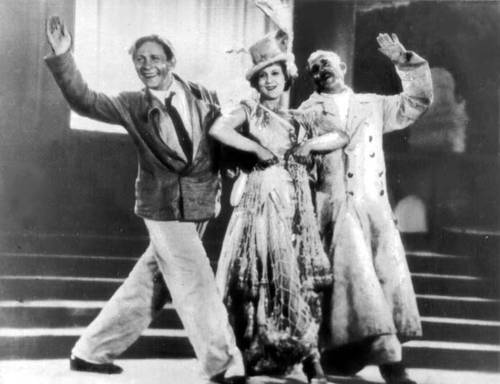
Leonid Utesov with Lyubov Orlova in Jolly Fellows

His popularity was on the rise in the 1930s when he co-starred with Lyubov Orlova in the comedy Jolly Fellows. In it, Utesov performed such hits as "Serdtse" (Heart). During World War II, Utesov performed on the front lines, helping lift the spirits of the Soviet soldiers fighting against the Nazis. He donated two La-5 planes to 5th Guards Fighter Aviation Regiment; one of planes was named "Jolly Fellows". After a meeting with Vitaly Popkov, flight commander of the "singing" squadron and Head of the amateur frontline orchestra, Leonid Osipovich presented the squadron with forty-two of his vinyl records. On Victory Day (9 May 1945), Utesov performed on Sverdlov Square in Moscow.

Utesov lived in Moscow for the rest of his life, albeit in many of his songs he alluded to his native town of Odessa, where a monument to him was dedicated in 2000.

Richard Stites writes:

In the years of the "red jazz age" (1932–1936) European and Soviet bands were heard in dozens of cities. The kings were Alexander Tsfasman and Leonid Utesov. ... Utesov – musically far less gifted – was actually more popular than Tsfasman, partly because of the spectacular success of his comedy film Happy-Go-Lucky Guys, but mostly because his Odessa background and his circus and carnival road experience on the southern borscht belt gave him a clowning manner. He resembled his idol, the personable Ted ("Is everybody happy?") Lewis more than he did any of the great jazz figures of the time. In fact, Utesov was the typical estrada entertainer – quick witted, versatile, and funny. He was not only one of the stars of the 1930s but also a personal favorite of Stalin.

=== Family ===
Leonid Utyosov was married twice:

• From 10 December 1914 — to Elena Iosifovna Goldina, (born Enta Eselevna Goldin, stage name Elena Osipovna Lenskaya; 1893, Nikopol — 1962, Moscow). She is buried at the Vostryakovskoe Jewish Cemetery.

• From 8 October 1981 — to Antonina Sergeevna Revels (1923–1997), who had been a dancer in his ensemble since 1943. The marriage was registered in Leonid Utyosov’s apartment, where the head of the district civil registry office came specially; the witness was the conductor Oleg Lundstrem.

•• His daughter from the first marriage, Edita Leonidovna Utyosova (1915–1982), was a soloist in his orchestra (her husband was the director Albert Aleksandrovich Gendelshtein). Utyosov performed many songs as duets with her, including the widely known “Tout va très bien madame la marquise” and “My Dear Muscovites”. She is buried at Vostryakovskoe Cemetery in Moscow next to her husband.

== Filmography ==
- 1919 – Lieutenant Schmidt – Freedom Fighter (Russian: Лейтенант Шмидт — борец за свободу)
- 1923 – Trade-House "Entente and Co." (Russian: Tорговый дом «Антанта и К»)
- 1926 – Career of Spirka Shpandyr (Russian: Карьера Спирьки Шпандыря)
- 1928 – Strangers (Russian: Чужие)
- 1934 – Jolly Fellows (Russian: Весёлые ребята) — Kostya Potekhin
- 1940 – Concert on the Screen (Russian: Концерт на экране)
- 1942 – Concert for the Frontlines (Russian: Концерт фронту)
- 1954 – Merry Stars (Russian: Весёлые звёзды)
- 1963 – Melodies of Dunayevsky (Russian: Мелодии Дунаевского)
- 1974 – Pyotr Martynovich and the Years of a Great Life (Russian: Пётр Мартынович и годы большой жизни)

== Singles ==
- Gop so smykom
- From the Odessa jail
- Mishka the Odessan
- Havana
- Have a good night
- Road to Berlin
- My dear Muscovites
- Waves of the Danube
- Jewish Rhapsody
- Ten Daughters
- Comin' in on a Wing and a Prayer
- When Johnny came home
- Leningrad bridges
- March of the Jolly Fellows
- Oh Heart
- A Pair of Chestnuts
- The Old Cabman’s Song
- Tout va très bien madame la marquise
- The Sea Lies Wide and Open
- Suliko
- The tachanka
- By the Black Sea
- The American Unemployed Man’s Song
- Ah, My Beloved Odessa
- Moscow Windows
- Be Stern with Me
- The Pass
- Song of the Company’s Lead Singer

== Honours and awards ==
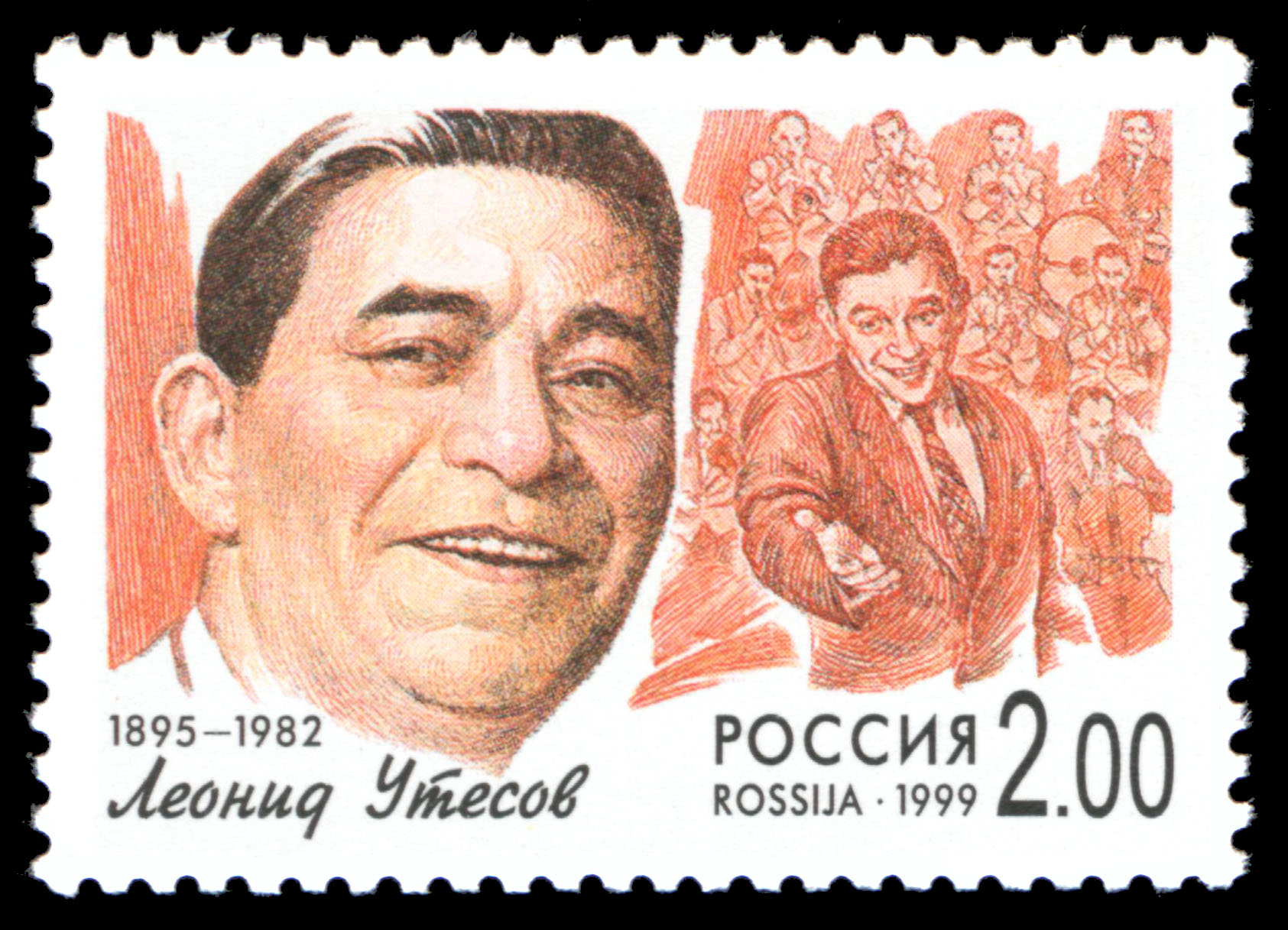
A Russian stamp honoring Leonid Utesov, 1999, 2 rub. (Michel 756, Scott 6542)

A minor planet, 5944 Utesov, discovered on 2 May 1984, is named after him. On March 21, 2020, Google celebrated his 125th birthday with a Google Doodle.

== See also ==
- Pyotr Leshchenko
- Mark Bernes
- Klavdiya Shulzhenko
- List of Jewish musicians
- Mishka Yaponchik
