= Mosfilm =

Soviet and Russian film company

Kinostudiya MosFilm
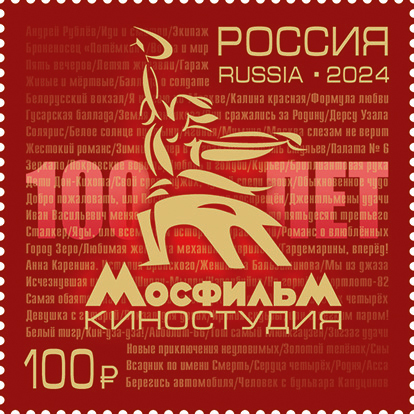
- A 2024 stamp of Russia dedicated to the 100th anniversary of Mosfilm, featuring its post-2012 logo
- Type: Federal state unitary enterprise
- Industry: Motion pictures
- Founded: 30 January 1924; 102 years ago
- Headquarters: Moscow, Russia
- Key people: Karen Shakhnazarov (Chairman)
- Products: Motion pictures Television programs
- Net income: 917,747,000 Russian ruble (2024)
- Number of employees: 1,500
- Subsidiaries: ARK-film, Zhanr Film, Kinoslovo, Ritm, Kurier, Cinema Line
- Website: en.mosfilm.ru

Mosfilm (Russian: Мосфильм, Mosfil’m pronounced [məsˈfʲilʲm], initialism and portmanteau of Moscow Films) is a film studio in Moscow which is among the largest and oldest in Russia and in Europe. Founded in 1924 in the Soviet Union as a production unit of that nation's film monopoly, its output includes most of the more widely acclaimed Soviet-era films, ranging from works by Andrei Tarkovsky and Sergei Eisenstein, to Red Westerns, to the Akira Kurosawa co-production Dersu Uzala (Дерсу Узала) and War and Peace (Война и мир).

== History ==
Old Mosfilm logo

The Moscow film production company with studio facilities was established in November 1920 by the motion picture mogul Aleksandr Khanzhonkov ("first film factory") and I. Ermolev ("third film factory") as a unit of Goskino, the USSR's film monopoly. The first movie filmed by Mosfilm was On Wings Skyward (directed by Boris Mikhin).

In 1927, the construction of a new film studio complex began on Potylikha Street (renamed to Mosfilmovskaya Street in 1939) in Sparrow Hills of Moscow. This film studio was named after the Moscow amalgamated factory Soyuzkino "Tenth Anniversary of October Revolution". In 1934, the film studio was renamed to Moskinokombinat, and in 1936 was relaunched under the Mosfilm name, the name it carries till today. During World War II the film studio personnel were evacuated to Alma-Ata (August 1941) and merged with other Soviet production units into the Central United Film Studio (TsOKS). The Mosfilm personnel returned to Moscow at the end of 1943.

The Mosfilm intro, representing the monument "Worker and Kolkhoz Woman" by Vera Mukhina and Spasskaya Tower of the Kremlin, was introduced in 1947 in the musical comedy Springtime directed by Grigori Aleksandrov and starring Lyubov Orlova and Nikolai Cherkasov.

After the dissolution of the Soviet Union, Mosfilm had produced more than 3,000 films, some of them being granted awards at international film festivals. It continued operations as a quasi-private production company, led by film director Karen Shakhnazarov. As of 2005, the company embraced ten independent studios, located within 13 sound stages occupying an area of 13,000 sq. meters. Tours through this "Russian Hollywood" included a view of Mosfilm's enormous depot with 170 tanks and 50 vintage cars. According to Mosfilm chairman Shakhnazarov the studio handed over to the Russian Armed Forces in 2023 28 T-55 tanks, 8 PT-76 tanks, 6 infantry fighting vehicles and 8 tow trucks. The biggest sound stage is leased annually to hold the Golden Eagle Awards. In 2011, Mosfilm released a selection of its classic films online for free viewing.

== Selected films ==
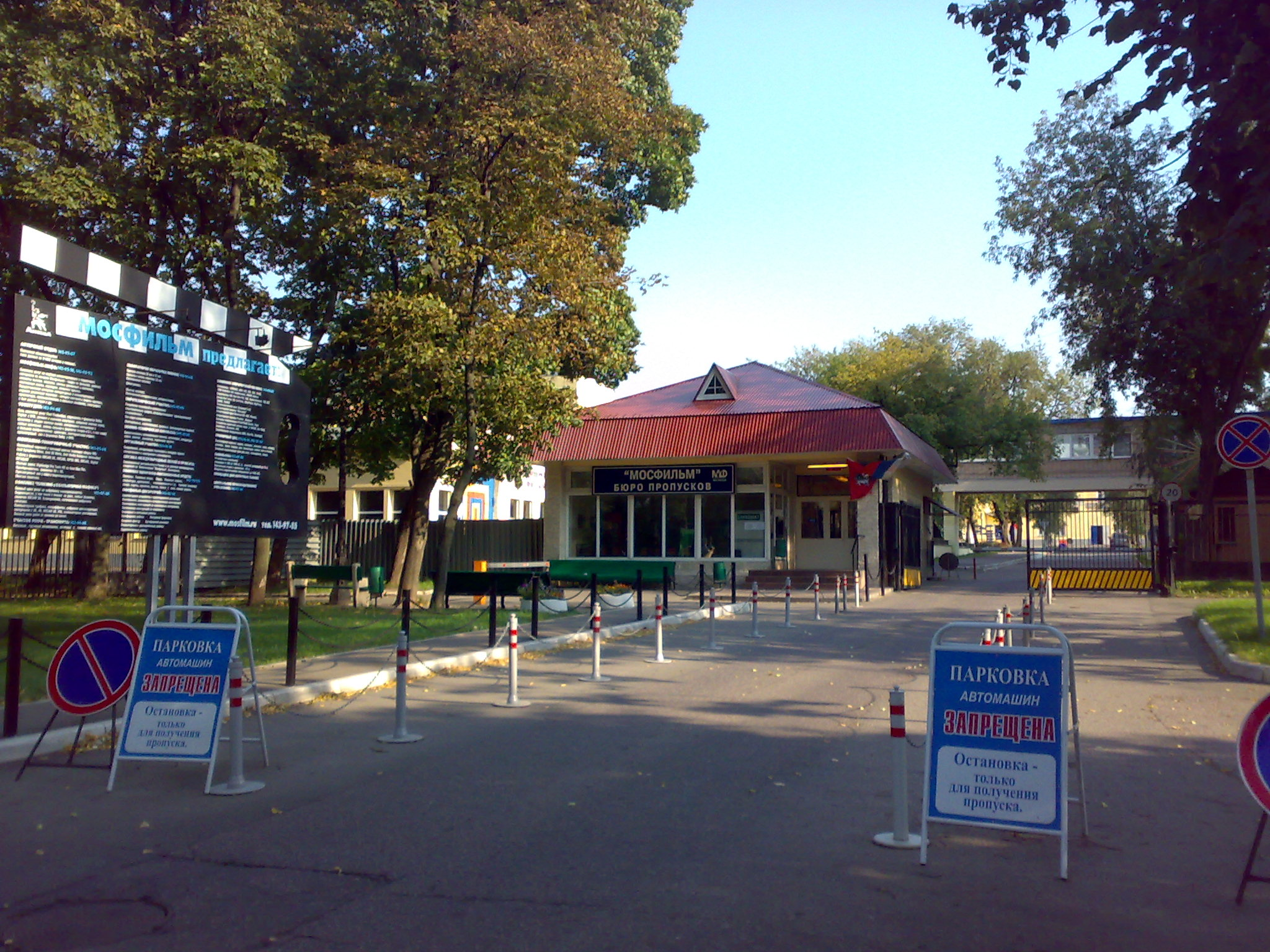
Entrance to Mosfilm Studios with a large clapperboard sign at left

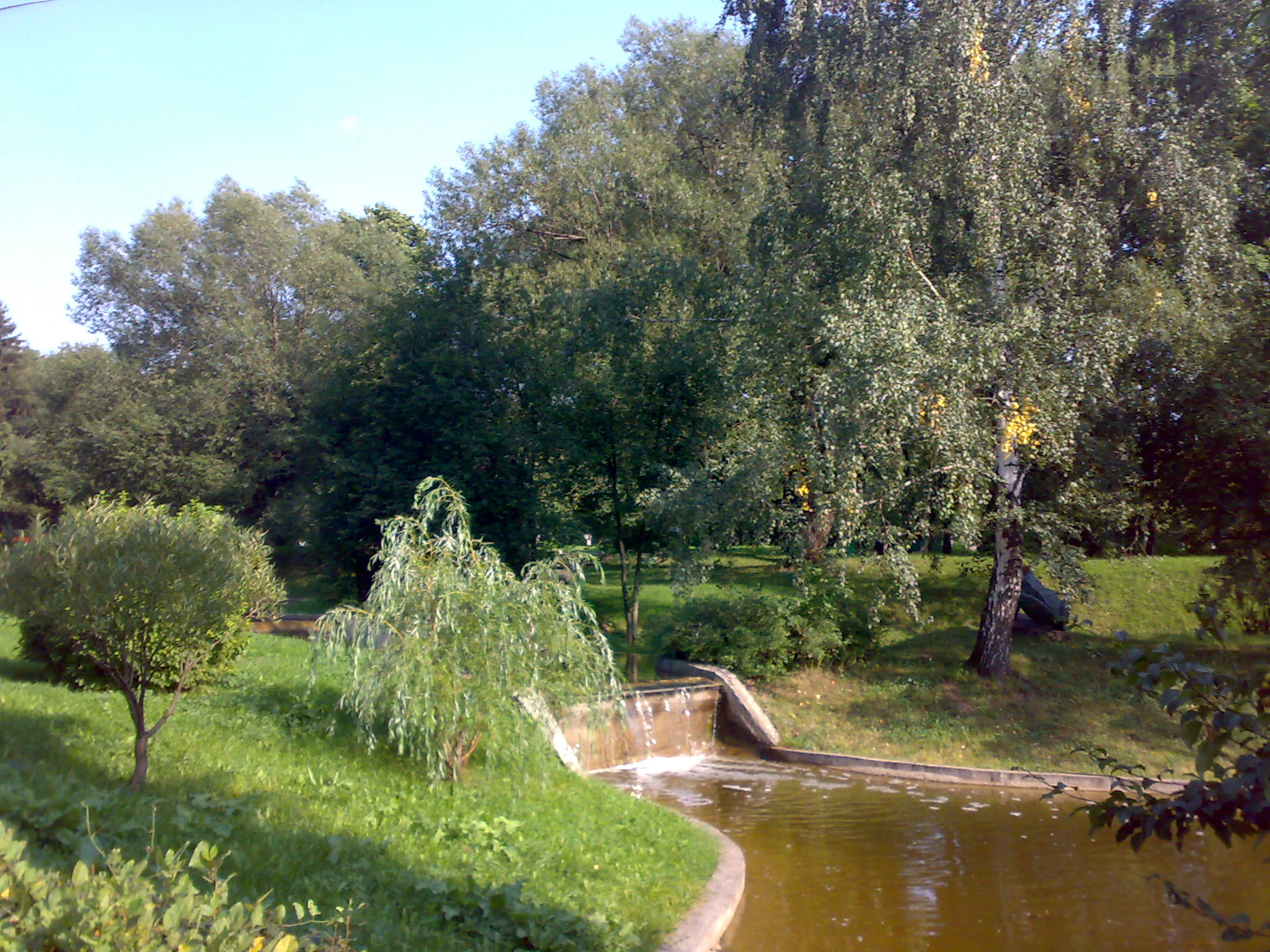
Cascading pond at Mosfilm Studios

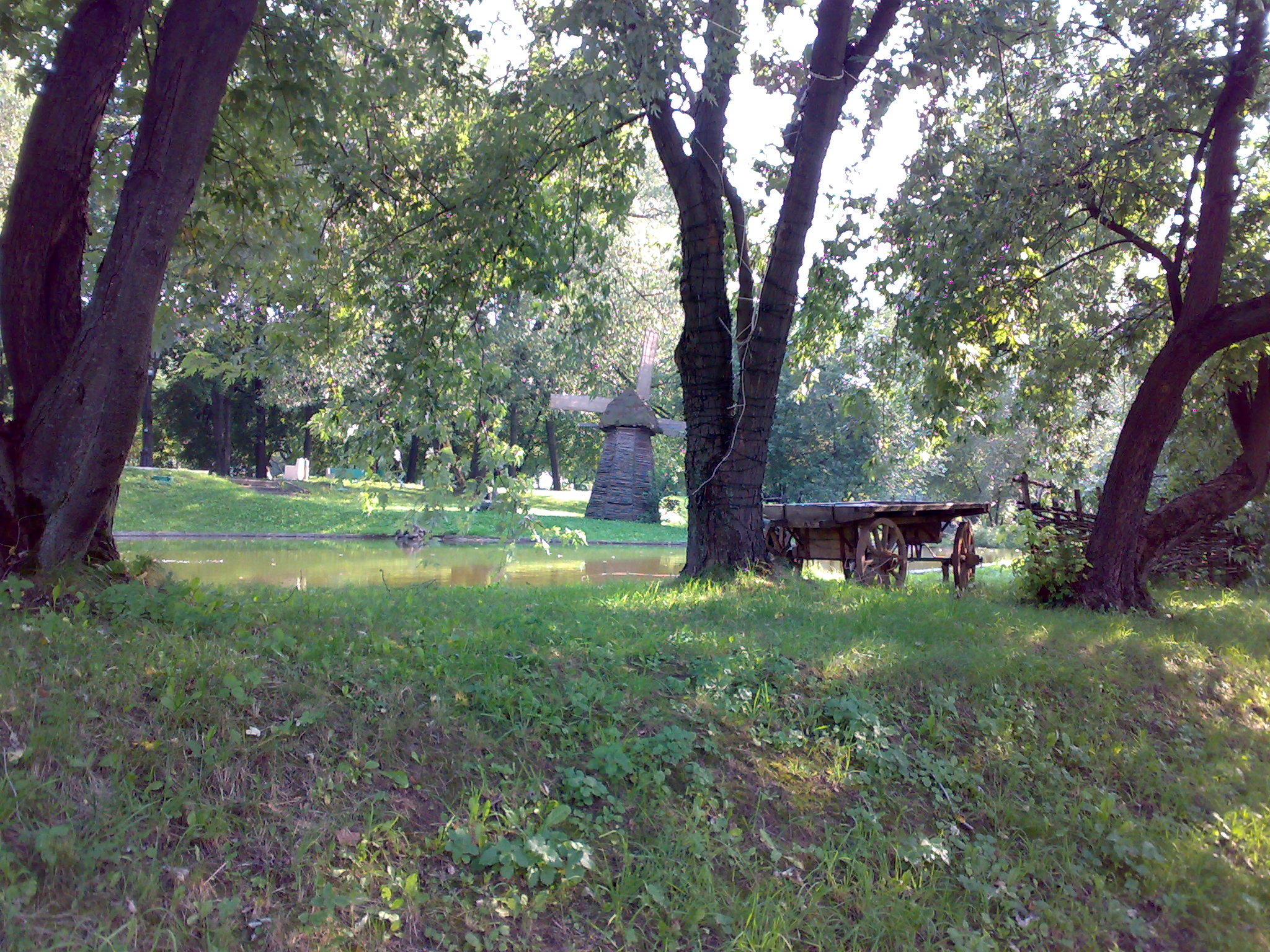
Wooden props used as landscaping features in Mosfilm Park

Directed by Sergei Eisenstein

- 1925 The Battleship Potemkin, a historical silent film
- 1938 Alexander Nevsky, a historical film
- 1946 Ivan the Terrible (1945 film)#Part II: The Boyars' Plot, a historical film

Directed by Andrei Tarkovsky

- 1960 The Steamroller and the Violin, a short film
- 1962 Ivan's Childhood, the Golden Lion Award winner at the 1962 Venice Film Festival
- 1966 Andrei Rublev
- 1972 Solaris (sci-fi)
- 1975 The Mirror
- 1979 Stalker
- 1983 Nostalghia (drama) (support withdrawn; see Nostalghia#Production)

Others

- 1934 Jolly Fellows directed by Grigori Alexandrov (musical comedy)
- 1935 Aerograd directed by Alexander Dovzhenko (science fiction)
- 1936 Circus directed by Alexandrov (musical comedy)
- 1938 Volga-Volga also directed by Alexandrov (musical comedy)
- 1939 Minin and Pozharsky directed by Vsevolod Pudovkin and Mikhail Doller (historical film)
- 1950 The Fall of Berlin directed by Mikheil Chiaureli, (war, propaganda). Music by Dmitri Shostakovich
- 1956 Ilya Muromets directed by Aleksandr Ptushko (fantasy film)
- 1957 The Cranes Are Flying, a war drama directed by Mikhail Kalatozov, 1958 winner of Palme d'Or at the Cannes Film Festival
- 1957 Miles of Fire, an ostern film directed by Samson Samsonov
- 1959 Ballad of a Soldier, a war film directed by Grigori Chukhrai, a 1959 special jury prize winner of Cannes Film Festival and 1961 Academy Award nominant.
- 1959 White Nights, a soviet drama directed by Ivan Pyryev
- 1962 Hussar Ballad directed by Eldar Ryazanov (comedy)
- 1963 Walking the Streets of Moscow directed by Georgi Daneliya (comedy)
- 1964 Welcome, or No Trespassing directed by Elem Klimov (comedy)
- 1964 I Am Cuba directed by Mikhail Kalatozov (expressionism, propaganda)
- 1965 Adventures of a Dentist directed by Elem Klimov (comedy)
- 1966 Watch Out for the Automobile directed by Eldar Ryazanov (comedy)
- 1966 Wings directed by Larisa Shepitko (drama)
- 1966 The Elusive Avengers directed by Edmond Keosayan (Ostern)
- 1967 Viy (Film adaptation, horror film)
- 1968 War and Peace directed by Sergei Bondarchuk (historical), Academy Award for Best Foreign Language Film in 1968 winner.
- 1968 The Nile and the Life (feature film)
- 1968 The Diamond Arm directed by Leonid Gaidai (comedy)
- 1969 Liberation directed by Yuri Ozerov (historical drama)
- 1969 The Brothers Karamazov (historical), Academy Award for Best Foreign Language Film in 1969 nominant.
- 1969 White Sun of the Desert directed by Vladimir Motyl (Ostern)
- 1971 Tchaikovsky directed by Igor Talankin (historical), Academy Award for Best Foreign Language Film in 1971 nominee.
- 1971 Stariki-razboyniki directed by Eldar Ryazanov (comedy)
- 1972 Gentlemen of Fortune (comedy)
- 1973 Ivan Vasilievich: Back to the Future directed by Leonid Gaidai (comedy)
- 1974 At Home Among Strangers directed by Nikita Mikhalkov (ostern)
- 1974 Unbelievable Adventures of Italians in Russia directed by Franco Prosperi and Eldar Ryazanov
- 1975 Dersu Uzala (Soviet-Japanese joint production) directed by Akira Kurosawa (historical), Academy Award for Best Foreign Language Film in 1975 winner.
- 1975 Siberiade directed by Andrei Konchalovsky (saga)
- 1975 Afonya directed by Georgi Daneliya (comedy)
- 1975 The Irony of Fate directed by Eldar Ryazanov (comedy)
- 1976 The Ascent directed by Larisa Shepitko (war film), the Golden Bear Award at the Berlin Film Festival in 1977 winner.
- 1976 Queen of the Gypsies directed by Emil Loteanu (drama)
- 1977 Mimino directed by Georgi Daneliya (comedy)
- 1977 Office Romance directed by Eldar Ryazanov (comedy)
- 1979 Air Crew directed by Alexander Mitta (disaster movie)
- 1979 Moscow Does Not Believe In Tears (melodrama), Academy Award for Best Foreign Language Film in 1980 winner.
- 1981 Private Life (drama) directed by Yuli Raizman, Academy Award for Best Foreign Language Film in 1981 nominee.
- 1981 Teheran 43 (spy)
- 1982 Lenin in Paris (historical)
- 1985 Come and See directed by Elem Klimov (war film; a co-production with Belarusfilm)
- 1986 Kin-dza-dza! directed by Georgi Daneliya (science-fiction)
- 1987 A Man from the Boulevard des Capucines (red western) directed by Alla Surikova
- 1990 Lessons at the End of Spring (Уроки в конце весны), written and directed by Oleg Kavun (drama)
- 2002 The Star (war film) directed by Nikolai Lebedev
- 2007 The Irony of Fate 2
- 2008 You and I
- 2008 The Vanished Empire (Исчезнувшая империя)
- 2012 Kromov (Кромовъ)
- 2012 White Tiger
- 2016 Mrs K (Hong Kong, Malaysia, Singapore, and South Korea.)
- 2017 Anna Karenina: Vronsky's Story
- 2019 Soldier Boy

== See also ==
- Cinema of the Soviet Union
- Cinema of Russia
- China Film Group Corporation
