= Volga-Volga =

1938 film by Grigori Aleksandrov

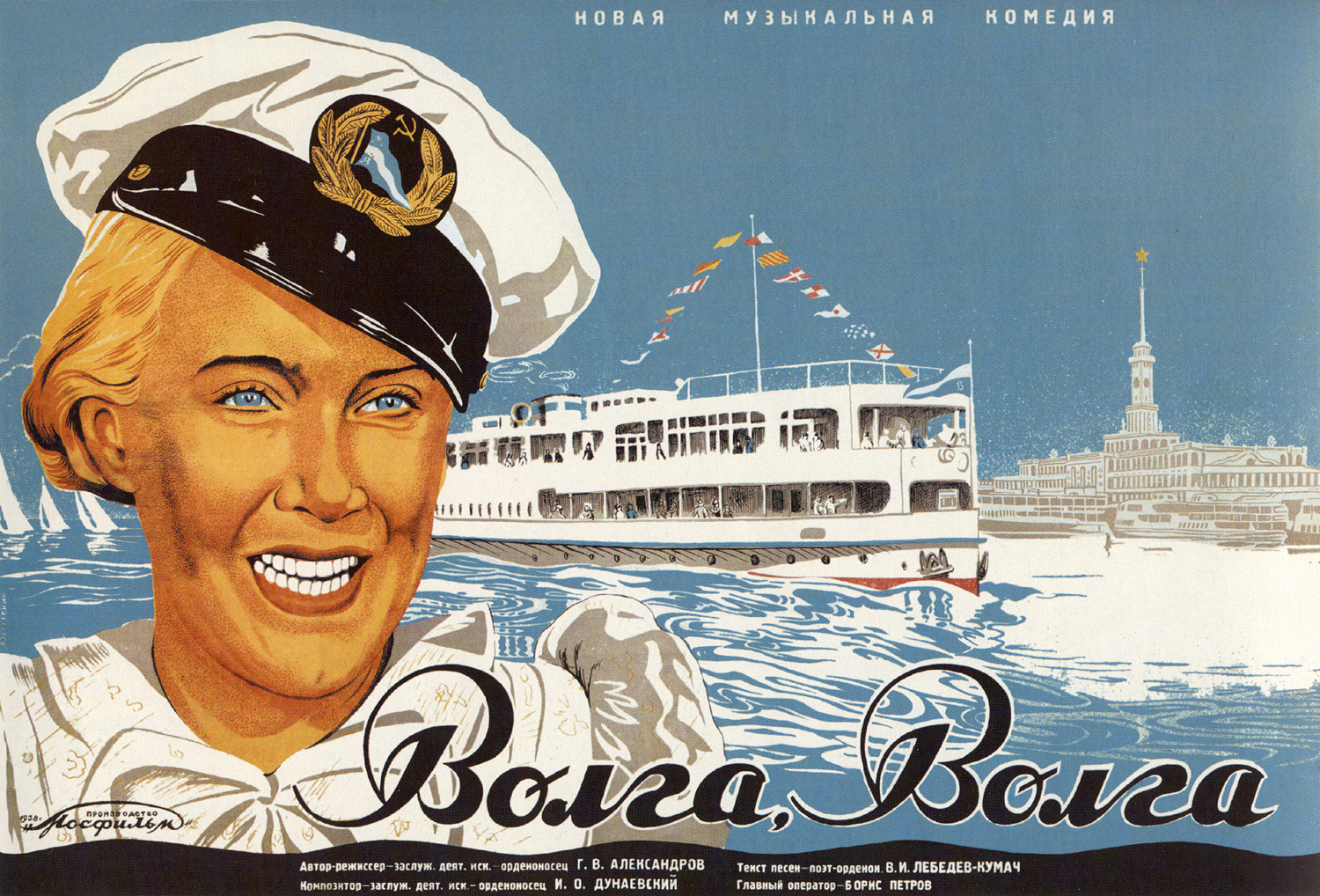
- Film poster, 1938.
- Russian: Волга-Волга
- Directed by: Grigori Aleksandrov
- Starring: Lyubov Orlova; Igor Ilyinsky
- Edited by: Yeva Ladyzhenskaya
- Music by: Isaak Dunayevsky
- Release date: 24 April 1938 (Soviet Union)
- Running time: 104 min.
- Country: Soviet Union
- Language: Russian

Volga-Volga.

Volga-Volga (Russian: Волга-Волга) is a Soviet musical comedy directed by Grigori Aleksandrov, released on April 24, 1938. It centres on a group of amateur performers on their way to Moscow to perform in a talent contest called the Moscow Musical Olympiad. Most of the action takes place on a steamboat travelling on the Volga River. The lead roles were played by Alexandrov's wife, Lyubov Orlova, and Igor Ilyinsky.

According to Orlova, the name of the film is taken from a popular Russian folk song, Stenka Razin, that Aleksandrov sang while rowing with Charlie Chaplin in San Francisco Bay. Chaplin jokingly suggested the words as a title for a movie, but Aleksandrov took it seriously and named his new film Volga-Volga.

The feature was said to be Soviet Premier Joseph Stalin's favourite film. Aleksandrov claimed Stalin watched it, "so often that he could recite many of the lines from memory". Nikita Khrushchev in his memoirs says that in the pre-World War II period Stalin laughed at him since he resembled a character from the film.

In 1961, a new version of a movie was released, with the "Joseph Stalin" ship cut.

In 2006, a colorization of the original black-and-white film began. The colorized version premiered on the Russian First Channel on February 14, 2010.

== Background ==
Before Volga-Volga, Grigory Aleksandrov wrote a script about a female taper (a ballroom cinema pianist), Katya Muratova, who could not find a better job after finishing her conservatory studies. It was based on his wife Lyubov Orlova's biography. When the film is torn, as was a regular occurrence in the silent film era, it takes time to repair the film, and the pianist has to fill the gap in order to calm down the audience, who is shouting "Bunglers!" and whistling in rage. So, the female pianist plays classical music and it usually works. But one time, the projectionist, delighted with her performance, deliberately delays the repair, and Katya Muratova performs the entire classical piece. The "purist" part of the public demanded that the theatre perform "the classics" instead of vulgar films; the other, of course, is against it. A fight ensues, and in the end, the cinema is smashed to pieces, and the taper is fired as a result. Unfortunately, the original film script was never given a green light, but the conflict between supporters of classical and contemporary music was incorporated into the film Volga-Volga by the director, with the addition of angst and Lyubov Orlova playing the opposite of her Katya Muratova part.

== Plot ==
In the provincial city of Melkovodsk along the banks of the Volga river, the musically inclined letter carrier Dunya Petrova, aka "Arrow" travels on a barge to carry an important message to Ivan Byvalov. Arrow has a great passion for music, and wishes to be a singer. Also travelling with Arrow is her boyfriend Alesha Trubyshkin, the conductor of a classical orchestra. She breaks up with him after he insults her song-writing abilities. Byvalov is an ambitious, pompous and rather boorish apparatchik who is hoping for promotion that will take him to a job in Moscow, and is most interested in her message. Arrow delivers the message to Byvalov, which is that Moscow wants amateur performers for the Moscow Musical Olympiad. Byvalov replies that no one has any musical talent in Melkovodsk, and he can send no performers. Arrow then leads what appears to be the entire population of the city in a series of songs and dances intended to prove the people do have musical talents. Byvalov finally agrees to send performers when he realizes this is a chance to go to Moscow.

Two groups of performers led by Trubyshkin and Arrow board a paddle-wheeler to go to Moscow, but Byvalov expels the group led by Arrow under the grounds that they have no musical talent while allowing Trubyshkin and his orchestra to stay. Undeterred, Arrow and her group board a raft and then a sailing boat to race the paddle-wheeler to Moscow. A series of comic mishaps occur as the two groups race to Moscow and along the way, Trubyshkin and Arrow exchange vessels, when both go looking for each other. Arrow and her group finally board the modern ship Iosif Stalin, where she finishes off The Song of the Volga that Trubyshkin disparaged. Due to a storm, the lyrics and notes for the song are lost. Arrow is heart-broken when she discovers that her song has become the most popular song in the Soviet Union after the lyric notes are discovered, fearing that she will never receive the credit she deserves. Trubyshkin finally recognizes her musical talent and the two reconcile.

In Moscow, Byvalov is credited as the author of the song because the lyrics are written on paper from his office; after first trying to take the credit, it is revealed that he has no musical ability. Reflecting his general ignorance, Byvalov names various long dead classical composers as the author before he is forced to admit that Arrow wrote The Song of the Volga. After a frenetic search, Trubyshkin and Arrow appear together at the Moscow Musical Olympiad and sing The Song of the Volga to great acclaim, winning the prize for best song. In what appears to be a reference to the Yezhovshchina, Arrow breaks the fourth wall to address the audience, saying that apparatchiks such as Byvalov are being disposed of.

== Cast ==
- Igor Ilyinsky - Ivan Byvalov, head of management at a small handicraft industry in the city Melkovodsk. The antagonist of Volga-Volga.
- Lyubov Orlova - Dunya Petrova (aka 'Arrow' Russian: Стрелка, romanized: Strelka), letter carrier. The protagonist of Volga-Volga.
- Vladimir Volodin - old pilot
- Pavel Olenev - Kuzma Ivanovich, water carrier / chef (reciter)
- Andrey Tutyshkin - Alesha Trubyshkin, accountant and Arrow's boyfriend.
- Sergey Antimonov - janitor Okhapkin
- Anatoly Shalaev - young composer
- Maria Vladimirovna Mironova - Zoya, secretary of Byvalov.
- Nikita Kondratyev - Philip Ivanovich, waiter
- Vsevolod Sanayev - bearded lumberjack / member of the symphony orchestra
- Aleksey Dolinin - policeman
- Ivan Chuvelev - chairman of the jury of the Olympics

== Gallery ==
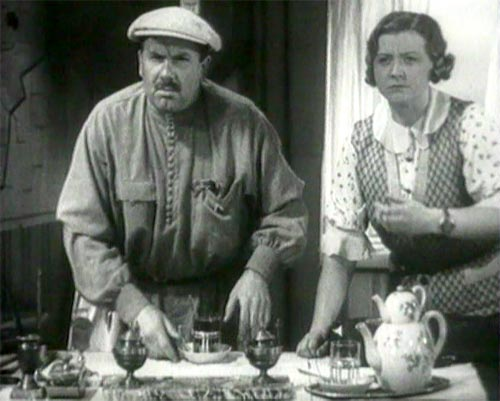
Igor Ilyinsky and Maria Vladimirovna Mironova

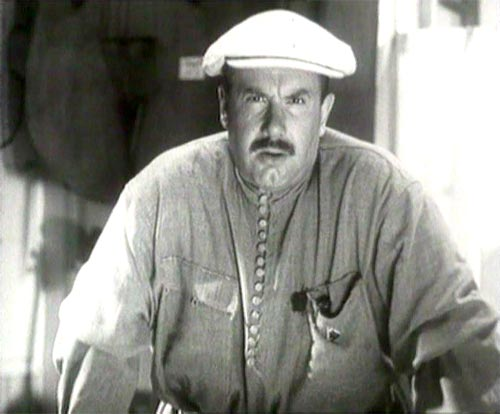
Igor Ilyinsky

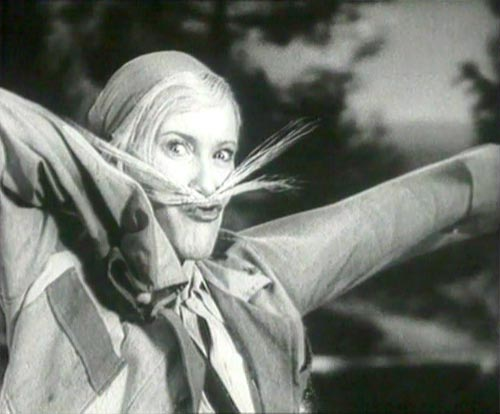
Lyubov Orlova

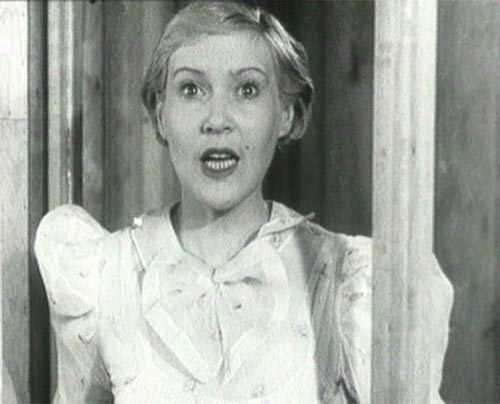
Lyubov Orlova

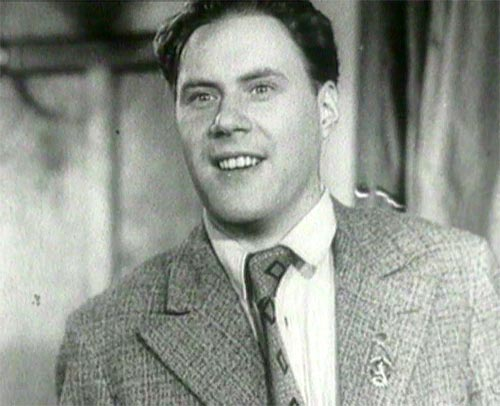
Andrey Tutyshkin
