= Faina Ranevskaya =

Soviet actress (1896–1984)

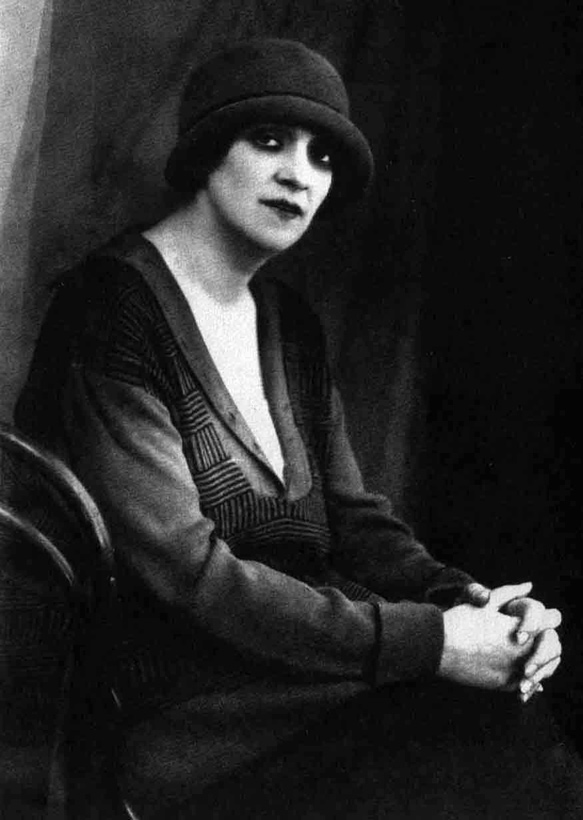
Faina Ranevskaya

Faina Georgiyevna Ranevskaya (Russian: Фаина Георгиевна Раневская, born Faina Girschevna Feldman, 27 August [O.S. 15 August] 1896 — 19 July 1984) was a Soviet actress. She is recognized as one of the greatest Soviet actresses in both tragedy and comedy. She was also famous for her aphorisms.

She acted in plays by Anton Chekhov, Alexander Ostrovsky, Maxim Gorky, Ivan Krylov, Fyodor Dostoevsky, Leo Tolstoy, and others.

== Biography ==
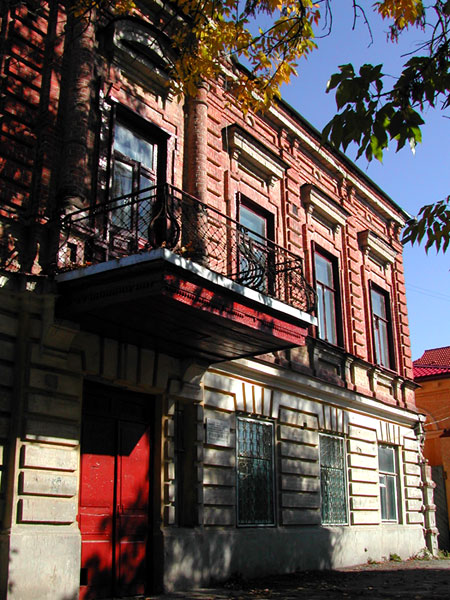
Birthplace of Faina Ranevskaya in Taganrog

She was born as Faina Feldman (Фельдман) to a wealthy Jewish family in the city of Taganrog, Russian Empire. Her father, Girsch Haimovich Feldman, owned a dry-ink factory, several buildings, a shop and the steamboat "Saint Nicolas". He was the head of Taganrog synagogue and founder of a Jewish asylum for the aged. Faina's mother, Milka Rafailovna (née Zagovaylova), was a great admirer of literature and art. That and her passion for Chekhov influenced Faina's love of art, poetry, music, and theater. There were three other children in the family - two brothers and an older sister named Bella.

Faina Feldman attended the elementary school classes at the Mariinskaya Gymnasium for Girls, and then received regular home education. She was given music, singing and foreign languages lessons. Faina loved reading.

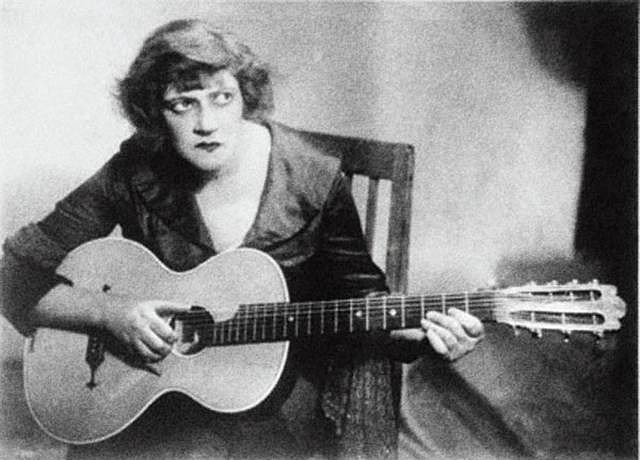
Ranevskaya as Zinka in Alexander Tairov's theatrical production of the Sonate pathétique (1931).

Her passion for theater began when she was 14. Her attendance of Chekhov's The Cherry Orchard at the Moscow Art Theatre was an experience that had a great impact on her. Her pseudonym "Ranevskaya", which later became her official surname, also came from that theater visit.

In 1915, she left Taganrog for Moscow to pursue a career in the theater. Faina became estranged from her family over her choice of career, which they apparently rejected. She started as an extra actor in crowd or background scenes at the Summer Theater in Malakhovka near Moscow in 1915, where she also had a dacha.

The Feldman family emigrated in 1917, but Faina decided to stay and continued her acting career, working in the theaters of Kerch, Rostov-on-Don, at the mobile theater "The First Soviet Theater" in Crimea, also in Baku, Arkhangelsk, Smolensk and other cities.

In 1931, Ranevskaya acted at the Chamber Theater.

The film Pyshka (known as Boule de Suif in the U.S.), directed by Mikhail Romm, marked her debut as a film actress in 1934. It was a silent black and white film based on the short story Boule de Suif by Guy de Maupassant, in which she starred as Madame Loiseau. Although the film was silent, Ranevskaya learned several sayings of Madame Loiseau in French from the original novel by Maupassant. Romain Rolland, a French writer who visited the Soviet Union in the 1930s, loved the film, and his favourite actor in the movie was Faina Ranevskaya.

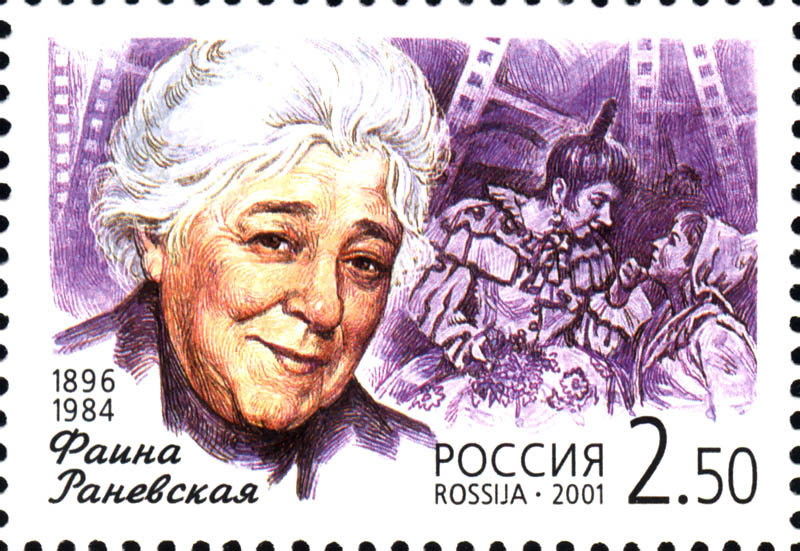

At his request, the Pyshka (Boule de Suif) was shown in French cinemas, where it became a box-office success. Ranevskaya played on stage of the Central Academic Theatre of the Russian Army (1935-1939), Drama Theater, now Mayakovsky Theatre (1943-1949), Moscow Pushkin Drama Theatre (1955-1963), and finally Mossovet Theatre (1949-1955, 1963-1983), where she worked with Yuri Zavadsky.

The actress was awarded the Stalin Prize for outstanding creative achievements on stage in 1949, and in 1951 for her work in the film U nih est' Rodina (They Have Their Motherland), directed by Vladimir Legoshin and Alexandre Feinzimmer. In 1961, Faina Ranevskaya was awarded the title of People's Artist of the USSR.

The actress died in 1984 in Moscow and was buried at the Donskoye Cemetery. A memorial plate dedicated to Ranevskaya was placed on her birthhouse in the city of Taganrog on 29 August 1986.

In 1992 British "Who's Who" encyclopedia named Ranevskaya among the world's Top Ten Actors of the 20th century. That was done despite the fact that the actress had never played a major part in a movie: all her roles were supporting ones. In a newspaper article, one of the Soviet movie industry apparatchiks explained Ranevskaya's lack of main roles to her "typical Semitic" facial features.

On 16 May 2008, a Ranevskaya Monument was inaugurated in Taganrog in front of actress's birth house on Ulitsa Frunze 10 within the framework of the International Ranevskaya Theater Festival "The Great Province".

In 2017, it was announced that Faina Ranevskaya's birth house in Taganrog would re-open its doors as a museum.

== Filmography ==
- Boule de Suif (1934) as Madame Loiseau
- The Ballad of Cossack Golota (1937) as priest's wife
- Engineer Kochin's Error (1939) as Ida Gurevich
- Man in a Shell (1939) as superintendent's wife
- The Foundling (1939) as Lyalya
- The Beloved (1940) as Manya
- The Dream (1941) as Roza Skorokhod
- Alexander Parkhomenko (1942) as pianist
- The Wedding (1944) as Nastasya Timofeyevna Zhigalova, bride's mother
- Heavenly Slug (1945) as medicine professor
- Springtime (1947) as Margarita Lvovna, housekeeper
- Cinderella (1947) as Cinderella's stepmother
- Private Aleksandr Matrosov (1947) as combat medic
- Encounter at the Elbe (1949) as Mrs. McDermot
- They Have a Motherland (1949) as café owner frau Wurst – Stalin Prize third degree (1951)
- A Girl with Guitar (1958) as Zoya Pavlovna Sviristinskaya
- Be Careful, Grandma! (1960) as Yelena Timofeyevna, Lena's grandmother
- An Easy Life (1964) as Margarita Ivanovna, "Queen Margot"

== Ranevskaya's aphorisms ==
- Life is a short promenade, just before the eternal sleep.
- Solitude is when you have a telephone but the only ringing comes from the alarm clock.
- Life is a sky-dive: out of a cunt, into the grave.
- Ageing is tedious, but it is the only way to live long.
- I spent all my life swimming in a toilet bowl, in the butterfly style.
- There are people with God inside, there are people with the devil inside, and there are people with only helminths inside!
- To star in a bad movie is as if to spit into eternity.
- God has made women pretty, so that men can like them, and silly, so that they can like men.
- You won't believe how old I am - I even remember some decent people!
- (Asked about her well-being) At night, everything aches, especially conscience.
- An actor has no inconveniences if it is necessary for the role.
- I'm watching this movie for the fourth time, and let me tell you, today the actors played like never before.
- Say and think about me whatever you like. When have you seen a cat interested in the mice's opinion about it?
- (After recovering from a heart attack) If the patient really wants to live, the doctors are powerless.
- (Answering how to lose weight effectively) Eat anything and whenever you like, but only naked in front of a mirror.
- Animals that are rare have been put into the red book, and those that are plentiful - into the cooking book.
- Condoms are white because white color fattens.
- A man only blushes twice: the first time when he can't the second time, and the second time when he can't the first time.
- A real man is the one who remembers your birthday and also does not remember your age.
- Those obnoxious journalists! Half the lies they tell about me aren't even true!
- Damn nineteenth-century upbringing: I can't stand up when men are sitting.
- Nowadays, when someone shies away from saying that they don't want to die, they say: "I want to live to see what happens next". As if, if not for that, they'd be all for dying.
- (Said in late 1970s) It's dreadful when you are eighteen inside, when beautiful music, poetry, art delights you ... and they say it's your time, and you haven't even done anything, and you feel like beginning to live!
- "Homosexuality is not a perversion. Perversions are field hockey or ice ballet."

== Awards ==
- Two Stalin Prizes second degree (1949, 1951)
- Stalin Prize third degree (1951)
- People's Artist of the USSR (1961)
