= Night Express =

Night Express, or variations, may refer to:

- Night Express (B&O train), an American named train of the Baltimore and Ohio Railroad
- Night Express (film), a 1948 French crime drama film
- Nightexpress, a German cargo airline

== See also ==
- Night Mail (disambiguation)
- Sleeping car, a railway passenger car with beds
- Sleeper bus, a coach with sleeping facilities
