= Night Mail (disambiguation) =

Night Mail is a 1936 British documentary film featuring a poem by W. H. Auden.

Night Mail may also refer to:

- Night Mail (1935 film), a British thriller film
- Night Mail (2014 film), a Chinese crime suspense thriller film
- Night Mail (advert), a 1988 British advert, based on the 1936 documentary
