= The Girl from a Far River =

1928 film

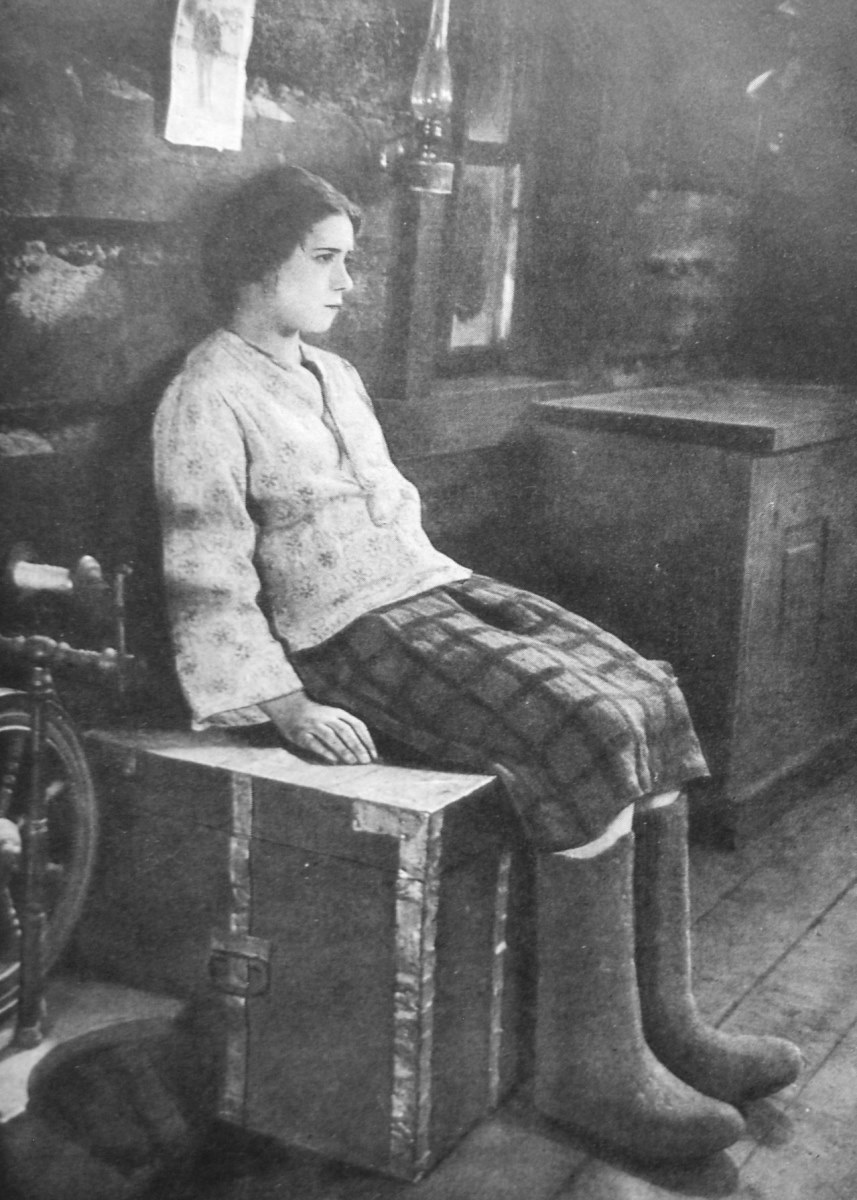
- Directed by: Yevgeni Chervyakov
- Written by: Grigori Aleksandrov
- Cinematography: Svyatoslav Belyayev
- Edited by: Lyubov Ivanova
- Production company: Sovkino
- Release date: 15 May 1928
- Running time: 77 minutes
- Country: Soviet Union
- Languages: Silent; Russian intertitles

The Girl from a Far River (Russian: Девушка с далекой реки, romanized: Devushka s dalyokoy reki) is a 1928 Soviet silent drama film directed by Yevgeni Chervyakov.

== Plot ==
During the NEP years, a young telegraph operator named Chizhok lives in a remote outpost, raised and educated by her grandfather, who taught her literacy and telegraphy before his death. She spends her days receiving sparse dots and dashes over the wire, learning about the great events shaping her country. As the years pass, her dissatisfaction with her isolated life grows, fueled by her dream of traveling to Moscow to witness the progress and see Lenin, who becomes a symbolic figure and imagined confidant. Her long-held aspiration finally comes true, and she arrives in Moscow, where she is initially overwhelmed by the city’s cold brilliance. Lavish advertisements and elegantly dressed NEPmen fill the streets, leaving her feeling lost and disillusioned. Just as despair takes hold, a vibrant Komsomol demonstration bursts onto the streets, replacing her disappointment with fiery enthusiasm.

Returning to her home along a distant river, Chizhok finds her once-static region transformed, with large-scale construction projects underway. She resumes her work at the telegraph, now fully understanding that her efforts are part of a greater collective mission to build a new society. The film ends with a powerful image of a train emerging triumphantly from a tunnel carved through the mountains, Lenin’s portrait displayed prominently on the locomotive, symbolizing the unity and progress of the era.

== Cast ==
- Roza Sverdlova as Chizhok
- Vladimir Romashkov as Chizhok's Grandfather
- Pyotr Kirillov as Aleksey
- Mikhail Gipsi as Old Hunter
- Aleksandr Gromov as Public Speaker

== Bibliography ==
- Christie, Ian & Taylor, Richard. The Film Factory: Russian and Soviet Cinema in Documents 1896-1939. Routledge, 2012.
