= Brake Post Office stowage van =

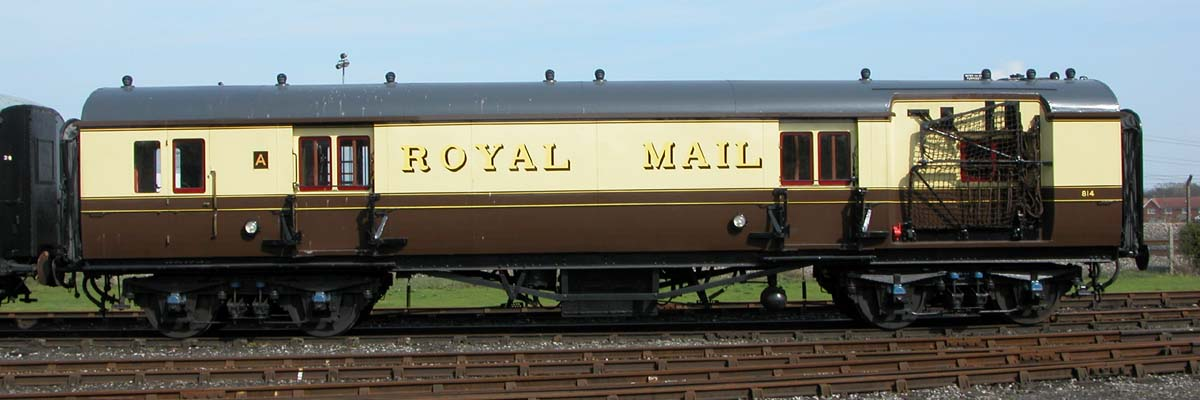
- Preserved Great Western Railway vehicle no. 814 at the Didcot Railway Centre.
- In service: 1959–2004
- Manufacturer: BR Wolverton & York
- Family name: British Railways Mark 1
- Constructed: 1959, 1968
- Number built: 9
- Fleet numbers: 80450–80458
- Operators: British Railways

Specifications
- Car length: 64 ft 6 in (19.66 m)
- Width: 9 ft 3 in (2.82 m)
- Height: 12 ft 9 1/2 in (3.90 m)
- Maximum speed: 90–100 mph (145–161 km/h)
- Weight: 34–36 tonnes (33.5–35.4 long tons; 37.5–39.7 short tons)
- HVAC: Dual (steam & electric), ETH 3 or 4
- Bogies: BR2 or B5
- Braking system(s): Vacuum or Dual (Air & Vacuum)
- Track gauge: 4 ft 8 1/2 in (1,435 mm)

A brake Post Office stowage van is a type of rail vehicle built for use in a travelling post office. The principal features were an open interior for the stowage of mail bags before or after sorting (but not for the sorting operation itself); and a compartment for the train guard, equipped with a handbrake. Some were also provided with traductor arms and/or nets for the transfer of mail pouches between lineside equipment and the van.

Three were built by the Great Western Railway in 1933; one of them was written off in 1940, and a similar replacement was built that year. Originally, they did not have either nets or traductor arms, but both of these were fitted in 1946. They were used on the Great Western TPO service (Paddington to Penzance) until 1959, after which they were used on the Southern Region between London and the ports in Kent. They were withdrawn around 1972. One of these – the 1940 replacement – has been preserved.

British Rail built nine of these vehicles between 1959 and 1968, to two similar designs, both based on the Mark 1 coach design. They were numbered in the range 80450-80458. Following the Great Train Robbery, vehicles from 80456 onwards featured a revised design with smaller windows.

In the early 1970s, British Rail introduced the TOPS classification system. Vehicles were given the TOPS code NU, followed by an A if they were air-braked, V if vacuum-braked, or an X if they had both air and vacuum brakes.

== Preservation ==
All three of the latter-build Mk1 vehicles have been preserved. Also a survivor from GWR has also made it into preservation.

Number	TOPS Code	Built	Location
80456	NUA	1968 York	Nene Valley Railway
80457	NUA	1968 York	Churnet Valley Railway
80458	NUA	1968 York	Great Central Railway

Number	Company	Built	Location	Notes
814	GWR	1940 Swindon	Didcot Railway Centre	Only exchange equipped coach with nets on both sides
