= Railways (Conveyance of Mails) Act 1838 =

Act of Parliament of the United Kingdom

Railways (Conveyance of Mails) Act 1838 (Note: The citation of this act by this short title was authorised by section 1 of, and the first schedule to, the Short Titles Act 1896. Due to the repeal of those provisions it is now authorised by section 19(2) of the Interpretation Act 1978.)
- Act of Parliament
- Parliament of the United Kingdom
- Long title: An Act to provide for the Conveyance of the Mails by Railways.
- Citation: 1 & 2 Vict. c. 98
- Territorial extent: United Kingdom

Dates
- Royal assent: 14 August 1838
- Commencement: 14 August 1838 (Note: The Acts of Parliament (Commencement) Act 1793.)
- Repealed: 31 August 1953
Other legislation
| Amended by | Statute Law Revision Act 1874 (No. 2) |
| Repealed by | Post Office Act 1953 |

Status: Repealed

Text of statute as originally enacted

The Railways (Conveyance of Mails) Act 1838 (1 & 2 Vict. c. 98) was an act of the Parliament of the United Kingdom, which received royal assent on 14 August 1838. It required the transport of the Royal Mail by railways at a standardised fee.

The act empowered the Postmaster-General to require the railway companies to "convey the mails", either by special trains or scheduled ones, at such times of the day and night as he would direct; he also had power to specify the guards or postal officials to be carried. However, he could not require they be conveyed any faster than the maximum rate prescribed by that railway's directors for first-class trains. The companies were to be subject to Post Office directions regarding the specifics of carriage. If required, a whole carriage was to be set aside exclusively for the post, or a separate carriage for sorting letters. The Postmaster-General could also require the mails be carried in Royal Mail coaches, not the company's carriages.

The act did not specify a rate of payment, but rather left the remuneration to be agreed between the railways and the Postmaster-General, or if necessary settled by arbitration. These agreements were subject to alteration at a month's notice, though the Postmaster-General had the power to terminate the services of the railway companies without notice if compensation was paid. The penalty for refusing or neglecting to convey the mails was £20, and the railways could be required to post security by bond, under a penalty of £100 per day for neglect. Individual lessees of a railway, those not a body corporate or company, were not to be required to give security above £1,000. Finally, two arbitrators were to be appointed to mediate disputes between the Postmaster-General and the railway companies.

== Subsequent developments ==
The whole act was repealed by section 91(1) of, and the third schedule to, the Post Office Act 1953 (1 & 2 Eliz. 2. c. 36), which came into force on 31 August 1953.

== See also ==
- Travelling post office

== Bibliography ==
- The British almanac of the Society for the Diffusion of Useful Knowledge, for the year 1839. The Society for the Diffusion of Useful Knowledge, London, 1839.
