= Grigori Aleksandrov =

Soviet film director (1903–1983)

- Григорий Александров
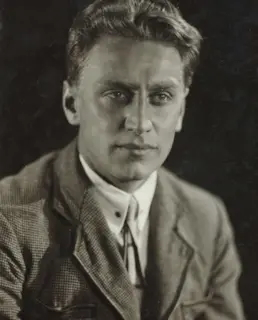
- Aleksandrov in 1934
- Born: 23 January 1903; Yekaterinburg, Perm Governorate, Russian Empire
- Died: 16 December 1983 (aged 80); Moscow, Russian SFSR, Soviet Union
- Resting place: Novodevichy Cemetery, Moscow; 55°43′29″N 37°33′15″E
- Occupations: Actor, film director, screenwriter
- Spouses: Olga Ivanova (m. 1925–1933) Lyubov Orlova (m. 1934; died 1975) Galina Krylova (m. 1979)

Grigori Vasilyevich Aleksandrov (Note: Russian: Григо́рий Васи́льевич Алекса́ндров, romanized: Grigory Vasilyevich Aleksandrov, sometimes anglicized: Alexandrov) (23 January 1903 – 16 December 1983, known by artist name Mormonenko) (Note: Russian: Мормоне́нко, romanized: Mormonenko) was a Soviet film director who was named a People's Artist of the USSR in 1947 and a Hero of Socialist Labour in 1973. He was awarded the Stalin Prizes for 1941 and 1950.

Initially associated with Sergei Eisenstein, with whom he worked as a co-director, screenwriter and actor, Aleksandrov became a major director in his own right in the 1930s, when he directed Jolly Fellows and a string of other musical comedies starring his wife Lyubov Orlova.

Though Aleksandrov remained active until his death, his musicals, amongst the first made in the Soviet Union, remain his most popular films. They rival Ivan Pyryev's films as the most effective and light-hearted showcase ever designed for the Stalin-era USSR.

== Early life and collaboration with Eisenstein ==
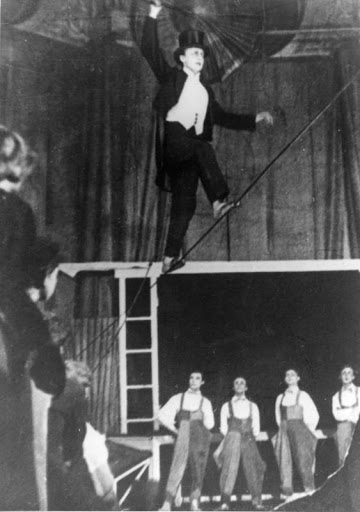
Aleksandrov walking the wire as Glumov for Eisenstein's Wise Man production

Aleksandrov was born in Yekaterinburg, Russia in 1903. Starting at age nine, Aleksandrov worked odd jobs at the Ekaterinburg Opera Theater, eventually making his way to assistant director. He also pursued a musical education, studying violin at the Ekaterinburg Musical School, from which he graduated in 1917.

Aleksandrov came to Moscow after studying directing and briefly managing a movie theater. In 1921, while acting with the Proletcult Theatre he met a then 23-year-old Sergei Eisenstein. In 1923, Aleksandrov was given the main role in Eisenstein's adaptation of Alexander Ostrovsky’s 1868 comedy Enough Stupidity in Every Wise Man (Na vsyakovo mudretsa dovolno prostoty) and in Eisenstein's first film Glumov's Diary (Дневник Глумова), a short film that was included in the play. Eisenstein and Aleksandrov collaborated on several plays before Eisenstein made his first feature-length film, Strike, which Aleksandrov co-wrote with Eisenstein, Ilya Kravchunovsky, and Valeryan Pletnyov. Next came Eisenstein's landmark Battleship Potemkin, in which Aleksandrov played Ippolit Giliarovsky. Aleksandrov co-directed Eisenstein's next two features, October: Ten Days That Shook the World and The General Line, which were also their last works in the silent era.

Along with Eisenstein's other major collaborator, cinematographer Eduard Tisse, Aleksandrov joined the director when he came to Hollywood in the early 1930s. He also traveled with them to Mexico for the filming of Eisenstein's unrealized project about the country. An edited version of the footage, known as ¡Que viva México!, was put together by Aleksandrov in 1979.

== Musical comedies ==
Aleksandrov returned to the Soviet Union in 1932 under direct orders from Joseph Stalin. He directed a pro-Stalin film, International (Интернационал), the following year and after a meeting with Stalin and Maxim Gorky, he embarked on making the first Soviet musical, Jolly Fellows, starring Leonid Utyosov and Lyubov Orlova, whom Aleksandrov later married (Orlova had been previously married to an economist who was arrested in 1930). She starred in his most successful films: Circus, Volga-Volga, and Tanya.

== During World War II ==
The Great Patriotic War (June 1941) came when Aleksandrov and his wife Orlova on vacation near Riga, Latvia. They hurriedly returned to Moscow. During one of the Nazi air raids, Aleksandrov had got a contusion and injured his spine. He made a propaganda movie Fighting Film Collection #4 with Orlova singing a new version of the famous march from Jolly Fellows: "A horde of dark villains has attacked our laboring and jolly people..."

At the end of October 1941, with the other Mosfilm employees, Aleksandrov and Orlova were evacuated to Alma-Ata, Kazakh SSR. Soon the director was sent to Azerbaijani Baku to run a local studio. There Aleksandrov and his wife made a film A Family which was banned from being released in theatres for "poorly reflecting the struggle of the Soviet people against the German fascist invader". In September 1943, Aleksandrov was ordered to return to Moscow as manager-in-chief of Mosfilm studio.

== After World War II ==
Aleksandrov's first postwar film was Springtime, another musical comedy starring Lyubov Orlova, as well as several other top-notch actors, including Nikolay Cherkasov, Erast Garin, and Faina Ranevskaya. He also made a movie about the Russian composer Mikhail Glinka, obviously pushed by his Moscow Conservatory nurtured wife.

Popular public figures in the Soviet Union, Aleksandrov and Orlova had a difficult relationship with Stalin, who admired their films (he reportedly gave a print of Volga Volga as a present to U.S. President Franklin D. Roosevelt) but frequently humiliated the pair.

He taught directing at VGIK from 1951 to 1957, Leonid Gaidai was among his students. He also made several films about the years leading up to the Russian Revolution, including several about Vladimir Lenin.

=== During Khrushchev Thaw ===
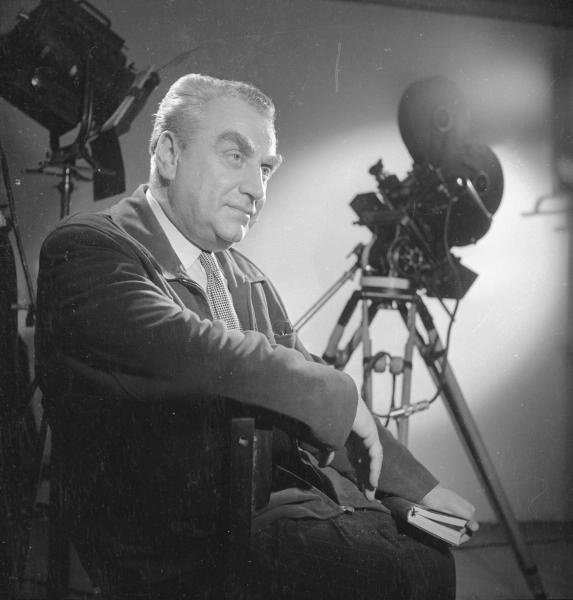
Aleksandrov in the studio, 1950s

Paradoxically, Aleksandrov found it harder to work in the more politically relaxed atmosphere called "Khrushchev Thaw" that followed Stalin's death. He was even punished for his success during the Stalin era. The level of harsh criticism about his movie Russian Souvenir (1960) was very derogatory, the satirical magazine Krokodil has published a feuilleton dedicated to the film, entitled "Is this specificity?" Immediately, as if on command, critical articles began to appear in other publications. The case went so far that Aleksandrov's colleagues were forced to defend the director. Izvestia has published a letter in support of Aleksandrov, signed by Pyotr Kapitsa, Dmitri Shostakovich, Sergey Obraztsov, Yuri Zavadsky and Sergei Yutkevich. The attacks on Aleksandrov had stopped but after that, he basically stopped filming. According to Russian actor Aleksandr Shpagin, Aleksandrov's humor wasn't understood then as clear as now.

=== During Brezhnevian Stagnation ===
Twelve years after his previous feature film, at the high of Brezhnevian stagnation, Aleksandrov was suddenly given enough money for a film about the Soviet spies during WWII. His last narrative feature was Skvorets i Lira (Starling and Lyre) (1973), which starred Orlova in her last role and was not released. However, the movie's existence has become a source of "Sclerosis and Climax" reference, a popular joke. Orlova died in 1975. In 1983, he worked on a documentary about the career of his late wife. He died in December 1983 of a kidney infection and was buried on the same line as Orlova, but not next to her, in Novodevichy Cemetery in Moscow.

== Honours and awards ==
- Order of the Red Star (January 11, 1935)
- Stalin Prizes:
  - First class (1941) for the film Circus (1936) and Volga-Volga (1938)
  - First class (1950) for the film Meeting on the Elbe (1949)
- People's Artist of the USSR (1948)
- Hero of Socialist Labour (1973)
- Three Orders of Lenin
- Three Orders of the Red Banner of Labour
- Order of Friendship of Peoples (January 21, 1983)

== Personal life ==
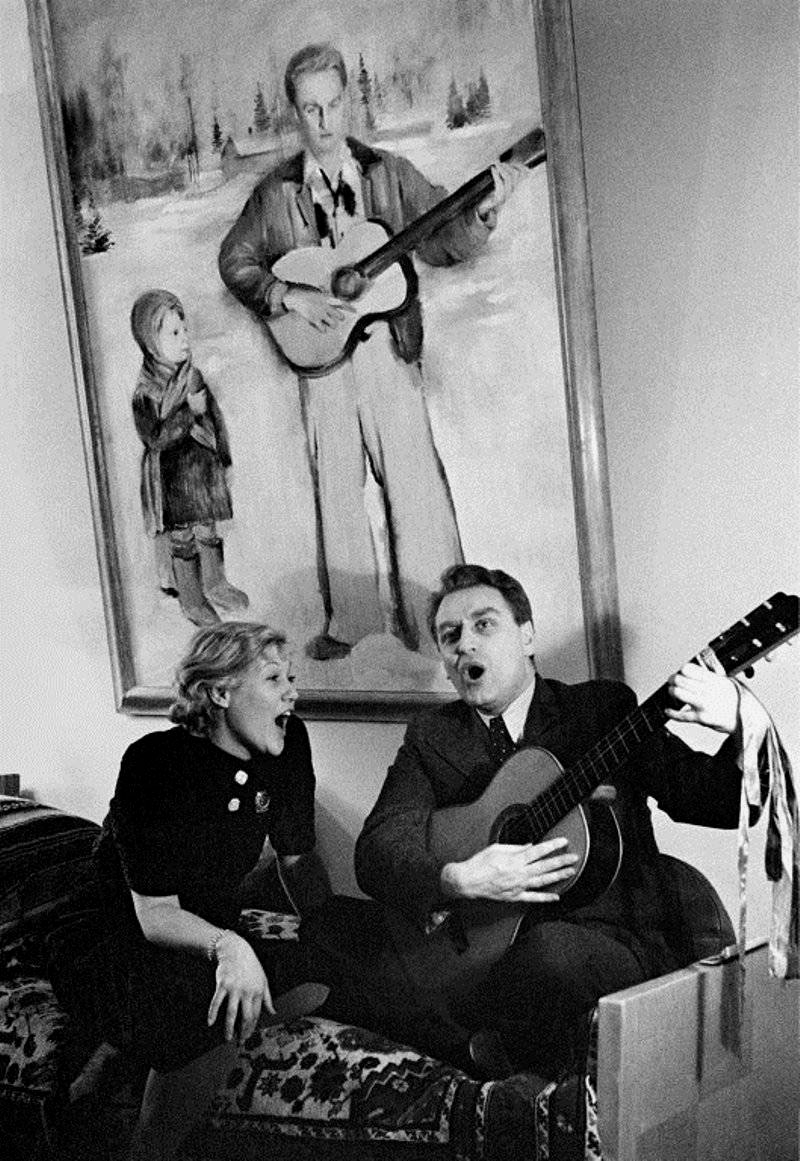
Aleksandrov singing with his wife Orlova in 1937

=== Sergei Eisenstein ===
Aleksandrov's 10-year-long partnership with Sergei Eisenstein was a source of rumors about their romantic relationship. According to film critic Vitaly Vulf, the "friendship is still a subject of speculation and gossips, although there is no evidence they had had a sexual relationship. Aleksandrov himself took these rumors calmly: 'Maybe he was infatuated by me ... I've never been infatuated by him.' Eisenstein, for the rest of his life, believed Aleksandrov had betrayed him when he married Orlova."

=== Marriages ===
The first marriage to an actress Olga Ivanova (died June 1941), from 1925 to 1933. During Grigori's three-year-long trip to Europe and Hollywood she became involved with a famous actor Boris Tenin, separated from Aleksandrov and eventually married Tenin. She died in labor, along with Tenin's child, just before the start of the Great Patriotic War.

- Son, Douglas Aleksandrov (1926–1978), named after Douglas Fairbanks, Aleksandrov's favorite actor. Forcefully renamed to Vasili during his arrest by OGPU in 1952. He was falsely charged on treason when the secret police tortured him to testify about his father being an American spy. He was released shortly after Joseph Stalin's death in 1953, after having his first heart attack in prison. Douglas-Vasilii died after his second heart attack in 1978, survived by his widow Galina Krylova.
  - Olga (b. 1946), granddaughter
  - Grigori (1954–2012), grandson

The second marriage to Lyubov Orlova, from 1934 to 1975 (her death). In June 1941, she adopted Douglas, after his mother's death. According to Orlova-Aleksandrov's archive owner, Jewish lawyer Aleksandr Dobrovinsky: "Many argued there was no relationship between Orlova and Aleksandrov. But they were, however, very strange. They never spoke to each other at all. These people, who have lived with each other for dozens of years, never said a single word to each other! They corresponded. We have tons of these notes in our office. Lyubov Petrovna insisted on this method of communication. Of course, in public, at a party, they talked, but in private it was only in writing. Klavdiya Shulzhenko, knowing about this, dedicated to them her romance "Don't Talk About Love". Why is that? Because Orlova did not want her husband to confess to her about his previous relationship. And she agreed with him that they are playing such a game, they didn't talk as a joke. Since Jolly Fellows, he had to prove to her his love, and he did it as he liked but not in words. Why words when you can explain yourself on the screen? Of course, there were sexual relations between them."

Dobrovinsky also added: "And the legend about a fictitious relationship emerged due to the fact that Orlova and Aleksandrov never slept in bed together. And it is true. But we have managed to find out why. The director's diary contains the following entry: “Her first husband, Andrei Berzin, was almost taken out of the matrimonial bed by the Chekists with bayonets. This injury remained with her forever and she could not physically fall asleep with another person. She had to sleep alone."

The third marriage to his son's widow Galina Krylova, from 1979 to 1983 (his death). Grigori Aleksandrov's mental health after the death of his second wife didn't allow him to process his son's death in 1978. He was sure "Douglas went to buy a loaf of bread". However, the documents were signed and his new widow had prevented Orlova sister's relatives from the inheritance of property.

== Legacy ==
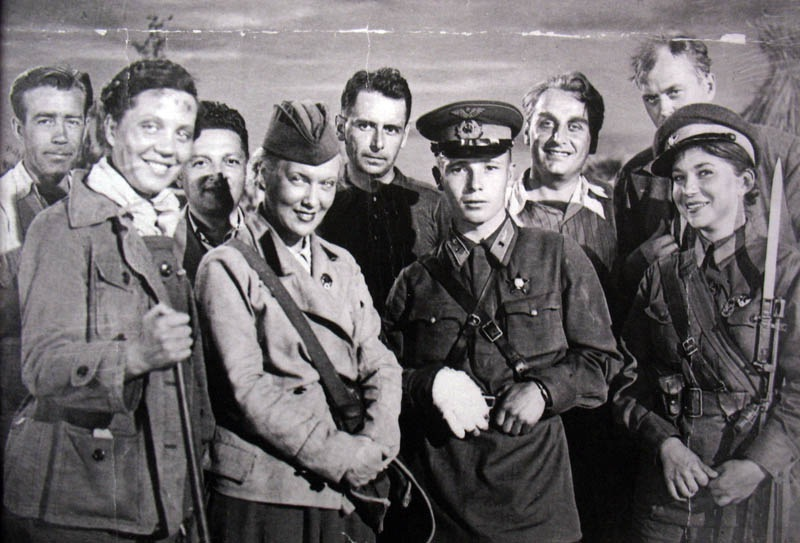
Aleksandrov (second row, 2nd from the right) and his wife Orlova (with a postbag) in Moscow during the shooting of Fighting Film Collection #4 in August 1941

Internationally, Grigori Aleksandrov is best known for his early work with Sergei Eisenstein. In the West, Grigori Aleksandrov has been seen as a talented Soviet director, though his themes have been considered as characteristic of Soviet propaganda film, and deflecting from criticism of Stalinism. In terms of aesthetics, some scholars compared Alexandrov's style to the international modernist styles of the European sense such as Art Deco, while others compared and contrast his work with Hollywood musicals. According to Salys, Aleksandrov's Circus "infused Soviet reality with the Western pageantry, glamor, and showmanship he admired, while simultaneously pressing its spectacle into the service of ideology." Other works such as the musical comedy Jolly Fellows have been seen as less ideological pieces. According to Kupfer, "in choosing musical content appropriate for contemporary Soviet viewers and transmitting it by using American-inspired formal structures that rely on music, Aleksandrov and Dunayevsky created a powerful hybrid that spoke convincingly to audiences and critics."

In Russia, Grigori Aleksandrov's pre-war movies have been credited for "helping to win the war", the Soviet Union's success against Nazis in the World War II. In 2016, Russian Jewish actor Valentin Gaft said about Aleksandrov's movie: "Those [terrible] were happening and there was this film that outweighed everything. It had brought great joy to a part of the population."

Following America's win in a Cold War in 1991, Orlova-Aleksandrov's movies about female empowerment, their 1936 box-office hit Circus with an American Catholic protagonist especially, were blamed for setting a losing trend for USSR cinema in a so-called propaganda war, eventually losing to its 1939 analog Ninotchka trend which also included a movie Comrade X. Maya Turovskaya about Ninotchka's connection to Circus: "This is the story of how a Soviet woman from the USSR came to France and stayed there because she fell in love with the French viscount. Unlike Marion Dixon, she does not seem to change the ideology, but in fact, just like in the Circus, not everything is well there, ideologically." According to Ph.D. O. V. Ryabov, “the villainization of the USSR” as a whole was the main American cinema on this topic, but not the only one: "Summing up the results used in the process of villainization of the USSR. Hollywood representations of the Soviet order of performing the construction of "red representation". At the same time, they serve as a significant component of the discourse of “mysticism of femininity” described in the bestseller by Betty Friedan. Finally, I would like to emphasize that many plots and images of American cinema were used in the anti-communist discourse of the perestroika with its slogans "return to normalcy", including the "natural relationships between men and women."

In 2014, Gender scholar Natalya Pushkareva wrote the comparative analysis on women in science portrayal: "The heroine of Grigory Aleksandrov's film Springtime is the first character of physicist Irina Nikitina played by Lyubov Orlova. The scientist lived alone in a two-story, bourgeois-looking apartment with a housekeeper, she was drinking her tea from the finest porcelain and tamed solar energy. The government was forming such a stereotype about the life of scientists, the myth of wealth. And those who were then loyal to the authorities and dealt with the allowed topic only, they had dachas and apartments. For the comparison, let's take the 2013-2014 film A Second Breath, also about a woman physicist Masha Sheveleva. In this plot, the main character is cheated on by her husband, with no housekeeper, she has a cruel shortage of money (and there are two children in her arms), she is not accepted by the "nano center". That is as our cinema has evolved, after over half a century, from the image of a woman professor, the one to whom the Soviet government gave everything just for her work, to a modern scientific worker whose work is not appreciated and is not adequately being paid. And they try to put it into the minds that a women's personal happiness is more important than her success in science, and, if she wants a scientific achievement, she should look for a husband who will replace her in the family. I remember such phrases from the series (screenwriters are men): "You are a good woman, Masha, even though you're intelligent!" or "I don't need a bluestocking full of ideas, I need a wife!"... These are the ideological concepts of the ruling party, and women's organizations associated with it understand unequivocally: it is necessary to return women to the family, to increase the birth rate. This conservative turn towards pronatalist politics has been evident since the early 2000s."

In 2015, Channel One Russia aired a television series about Grigori Aleksandrov and Lyubov Orlova, titled Orlova and Alexandrov.

Grigori Aleksandrov's top box-office hits, one year after the release date
| Year | Title | Millions of viewers |
|---|---|---|
| 1934 | Jolly Fellows | 30.0 |
| 1938 | Volga-Volga | 30.0 |
| 1936 | Circus | 28.0 |
| 1949 | Encounter at the Elbe | 24.2 |
| 1947 | Springtime | 16.2 |
| 1960 | Russian Souvenir | 16.0 |
| 1952 | The Composer Glinka | 15.0 |

== Filmography ==
| Year | Title | Original title | | | | |
| Year | Title | Original title | Director | Screenwriter | Actor | Notes |
|---|---|---|---|---|---|---|
| 1922 | Oh Russian Fate, a Female Destiny | Доля ты русская, долюшка женская | | | Yes | Vasili, son of the well-to-do peasant Egor, the film was lost |
| 1923 | Glumov's Diary | Дневник Глумова | | | Yes | Glumov |
| 1925 | Strike | Стачка | | Yes | Yes | Brigadier |
| 1925 | Battleship Potemkin | Броненосец «Потёмкин» | | | Yes | Chief Officer Giliarovsky, assistant director |
| 1928 | October: Ten Days That Shook the World | Октябрь | Yes | Yes | | Co-directed with Sergei Eisenstein |
| 1928 | The Girl from a Far River | Девушка с далекой реки | | Yes | | |
| 1929 | The General Line | Старое и новое | Yes | Yes | Yes | Traсtor driver, co-directed with Sergei Eisenstein |
| 1930 | Women's Trouble - Women's Happiness | German: Frauennot - Frauenglück | | Yes | Yes | Short, Switzerland |
| 1930 | Sleeping Beauty | Спящая красавица | | Yes | | Adaptation of Sleeping Beauty |
| 1931 | Oaxaca Earthquake | Spanish: La destrucción de Oaxaca | | Yes | | Short documentary |
| 1931 | Sentimental Romance | French: Romance sentimentale | Yes | Yes | | Documentary, formally co-directed with Sergei Eisenstein |
| 1932 | ¡Que viva México! | Spanish: ¡Que viva México! | Yes | Yes | | Co-directed with Sergei Eisenstein |
| 1932 | Five-year Plan | Пятилетний план | | Yes | | Short documentary |
| 1933 | Internationale | Интернационал | Yes | | | Short documentary |
| 1933 | Thunder Over Mexico | Гром над Мексикой | | Yes | | |
| 1934 | Jolly Fellows | Весёлые ребята | Yes | Yes | | |
| 1936 | Circus | Цирк | Yes | Yes | | |
| 1936 | Comrade I. V. Stalin's Report about the Constitution of the USSR Draft at the Extraordinary VIII All-Union Congress of Councils | Доклад товарища Сталина И. В. о проекте Конституции СССР на чрезвычайном VIII Всесоюзном съезде Советов | Yes | | | Documentary |
| 1938 | Volga-Volga | Волга-Волга | Yes | Yes | Yes | Rescue tug's Captain |
| 1938 | Sports Parade | Физкультурный парад | Yes | | | Documentary |
| 1940 | Tanya | Светлый путь | Yes | Yes | | |
| 1940 | Time in the Sun | Время на солнце | Yes | | | Documentary, co-directed with Sergei Eisenstein |
| 1941 | Fightin Film Collection #4 | Боевой киносборник № 4 | Yes | | | |
| 1943 | A Family | Одна семья | Yes | | | |
| 1944 | People of the Caspian | Каспийцы | Yes | Yes | | documentary |
| 1947 | Springtime | Весна | Yes | Yes | | |
| 1949 | Encounter at the Elbe | Встреча на Эльбе | Yes | | | |
| 1952 | The Composer Glinka | Композитор Глинка | Yes | Yes | | |
| 1953 | Great Mourning | Великое прощание | Yes | | | Documentary about Stalin's death |
| 1958 | From Man to Man | Человек человеку | Yes | Yes | | Documentary, Title translation: the word 'chelovek', often translated to English as 'man', is gender-neutral in Russian |
| 1960 | Russian Souvenir | Русский сувенир | Yes | Yes | Yes | Pilot (uncredited in titles) |
| 1961 | Lenin in Poland | Ленин в Польше | Yes | | | Documentary |
| 1962 | Queen's Companion | Спутница королевы | | Yes | | Educational, cartoon animation |
| 1965 | Before October | Перед Октябрём | Yes | | | Documentary |
| 1965 | Lenin in Switzerland | Ленин в Швейцарии | Yes | Yes | | Documentary, co-directed with Dmitri Vasilyev |
| 1966 | On the Eve | Накануне | Yes | | | Documentary, co-directed with Dmitri Vasilyev |
| 1974 | Starling and Lyre | Скворец и Лира | Yes | Yes | Yes | General |
| 1983 | Lyubov Orlova | Любовь Орлова | Yes | Yes | | Documentary |
