= Russian Souvenir =

- Russian: Русский сувенир
- Directed by: Grigori Aleksandrov
- Written by: Grigori Aleksandrov
- Produced by: Valentin Maslov
- Starring: Lyubov Orlova; Andrei Popov; Pavel Kadochnikov; Erast Garin; Elina Bystritskaya
- Cinematography: Grigory Eisenberg
- Edited by: Zoya Veryovkina
- Music by: Kirill Molchanov
- Production company: Mosfilm
- Release date: 1960
- Running time: 107 min.
- Country: Soviet Union
- Language: Russian

Russian Souvenir (Russian: Русский сувенир, romanized: Russkiy suvenir) is a 1960 Soviet comedy film directed by Grigori Aleksandrov. Despite the stellar cast, the film received devastating reviews from critics and was shelved. The worst film of 1960 according to the Soviet Screen magazine.

The film tells the story of when a plane makes an emergency landing in Siberia, an eclectic group of international passengers—including an American millionaire, a theology scholar, and a Soviet engineer—embarks on a transformative journey through the achievements of the Soviet Union, challenging their perceptions and culminating in a call for global peace.

== Plot ==
A plane flying from Vladivostok to Moscow makes an emergency landing on the shores of Lake Baikal. Among the passengers are John Peebles (played by Erast Garin), a theology scholar curious about what the Soviet people have replaced God with; American millionaire Adlai Scott (played by Andrei Popov), preoccupied with whether Russia could return to capitalism; his secretary, Homer Jones (played by Pavel Kadochnikov); the Italian "countess" Pandora Montesi (played by Elina Bystritskaya); and the enigmatic Dr. Adams. The only Soviet passenger, engineer Varvara Komarova (played by Lyubov Orlova), is forced to assume multiple roles: tour guide, diplomat, resource manager, and entertainer.

The characters journey to a newly developed city in Siberia, witnessing the construction of the Bratsk Hydroelectric Power Station and the launch of a rocket to the Moon. Through these experiences, their perceptions of the Soviet Union undergo a dramatic transformation.

By the film’s conclusion, the reformed American millionaire gives a sensational interview, while the main heroine, Varvara, delivers a heartfelt call for world peace. This moment is set against frescoes depicting Saint George slaying the dragon, symbolizing the triumph of good over evil.

== Cast ==
- Lyubov Orlova as Varvara Kapitonovna Komarova
- Andrei Popov as Adlai Hunter Scott, American millionaire and writer
- Pavel Kadochnikov as Homer Jones, Mr. Scott's secretary and an American writer of Canadian descent
- Erast Garin as John Peebles, Master of Theology, a committed misogynist and lifelong bachelor
- Elina Bystritskaya as Maria Pandora (Barbara) Montesi, Italian Countess
- Aleksandr Barushnoy as Dr. Adams
- Valentin Gaft as Claude Gérard, French composer
- Liu Zhi Chang as Wang Li Fu, Chinese pilot
- Anastasia Zuyeva as Maria Spiridonovna Yegorkina, wife of Yegorkin
- Georgiy Budarov as Yegorkin, Siberian hunter
- Alla Budnitskaya as Larisa Kurlychkina, oral translator
- Boris Novikov as Pyotr Safonov, newly settled worker
- Kola Beldy as student nicknamed “Shaman”
- Anatoly Vedyonkin as Sergei Komarov, Varvara's young brother
- Viktor Avdyushko as Spikhnulin
- Ivan Kashirin as watchman
- Elena Ponsova as Varvara's grandmother
- Nikolai Yudin as priest
- Lev Zolotukhin as Ivan Bobrov, academician
- Pyotr Savin as hunters' foreman
- Anatoly Solovyov as hunter in the bathhouse
- Emmanuil Geller as ginseng seller and con man
- Svetlana Kharitonova as Olimpiada Vasilyevna Safonova
- Mikhail Orlov as minister
- Leonid Chubarov as Ivanov, driver
- Arkady Tsinman as Arkady Tsinman, journalist
- Grigory Alexandrov as second Tu-104 pilot
- Inga Budkevich as flight attendant

== Reception ==
Soviet critics called the "Russian Souvenir" plotless, ideologically weak, superficial, propagandizing "architectural excesses in construction during the cult of Stalin's personality." In particular, the satirical magazine "Krokodil" published a review of the film, in which the director and actors were ridiculed. Lyubov Orlova herself was disappointed with this film: "Every frame is emptiness... And I have rehashes and rehashes of myself... As if I'm just doing what I'm trying to repeat the techniques I once found, but I can't do anything anymore".

Decades later, critics' opinions were still negative. Elina Bystritskaya in 2003 noted: "I will never forget how Lyubov Orlova, who was almost 60 at the time, starred in the film "Russian Souvenir", where she played a girl of about twenty-five. It was a painful sight, and the film justly failed.". Alexander Malakhov from Kommersant, evaluating this work by Alexandrov and Orlova, wrote in 2005: "They could not get rid of ideological cliches, and in the 60s, stories about reeducated American millionaires caused not laughter, but irritation. The "Russian Souvenir" failed". Peter Rollberg wrote in Historical Dictionary of Russian and Soviet Cinema (2016) that Russian Souvenir "proved beyond doubt that the actress’s official image had become an anachronism despite the persistent admiration of millions of viewers".
