= Night Mail (advert) =

1988 British railway advertisement

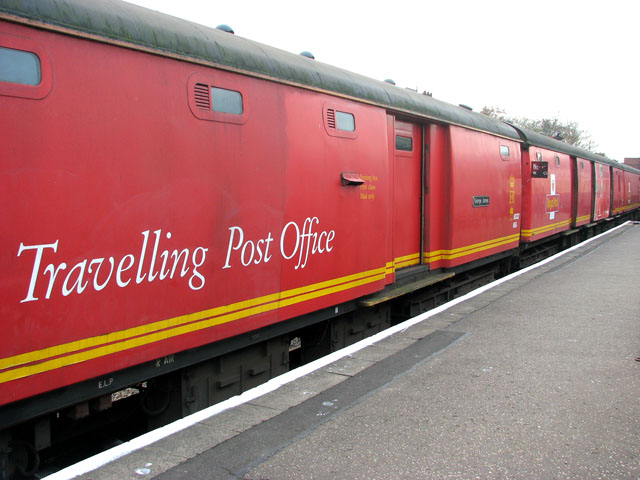
- A Travelling Post Office similar to the one featured in the advert
- Agency: Lowe Howard-Spink
- Client: British Rail
- Market: United Kingdom
- Language: English
- Media: Television
- Running time: 2 min 30 sec (full); 1 min 30 sec (shortened)
- Product: Rail travel in Great Britain
- Release date: 25 December 1988
- Slogan: Britain's Railway
- Written by: W. H. Auden (original verse)
- Directed by: Hugh Hudson
- Music by: Vangelis
- Starring: Tom Courtenay (voiceover)
- Production company: Ridley Scott Associates; British Transport Films

Night Mail, also known as Concerto or Britain's Railway, was a 1988 British advert produced by Ridley Scott Associates and British Transport Films for British Rail. It was based on the 1936 documentary of the same name, and used the first stanza of a poem by W. H. Auden that was written for the film. Further verses in the style of Auden were written to accompany the footage, read out by actor Tom Courtenay.

The advert showcased the newly created business sectors of British Rail (including InterCity, Network South East, Provincial, Railfreight and Parcels) and was the last advert to promote the network as a whole before privatisation in 1997. It was directed by Hugh Hudson and featured music by Greek composer Vangelis.

== Documentary ==
The advert was inspired by the GPO Film Unit's 24-minute film Night Mail, which documents the journey of the nightly "Postal Special" travelling from London to Scotland. This film was directed and produced by Harry Watt and Basil Wright, and ended with a specially commissioned poem by W. H. Auden. The documentary was critically acclaimed at the time, and a sequel was created for its 50th anniversary in 1986.

== Production ==
The advert was filmed in September 1988, and featured aerial shots of famous structures including the Forth, Tyne and Saltash bridges, that – although impressive – made it very expensive to produce.

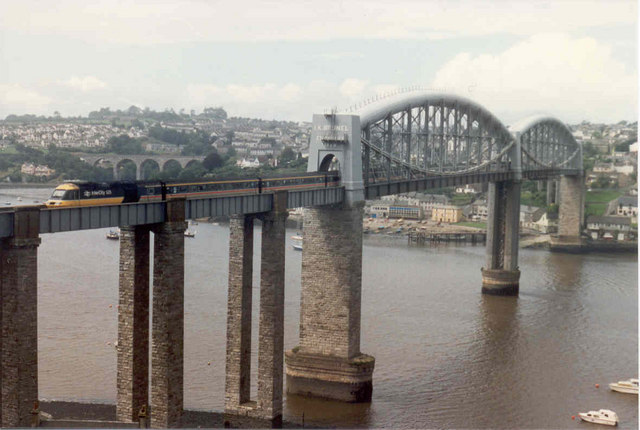
A High Speed Train crosses the Royal Albert Bridge

The opening shot is of a Travelling Post Office, as Tom Courtenay begins to recite Auden's poem:

This is the Night Mail crossing the border,
bringing the cheque and the postal order.
Letters for the rich, letters for the poor,
the shop at the corner and the girl next door.
Pulling up Beattock a steady climb,
the gradient's against her, but she's on time.

Courtenay then breaks from the original verse as the video goes on to detail British Rail's freight operations:

Passing the shunter intent on its toil,
moving the coke and the coal and the oil.
Girders for bridges, plastic for fridges.
Bricks for the site are required by tonight.
Grimy and grey is the engine's reflection,
down to the docks for the metal collection.

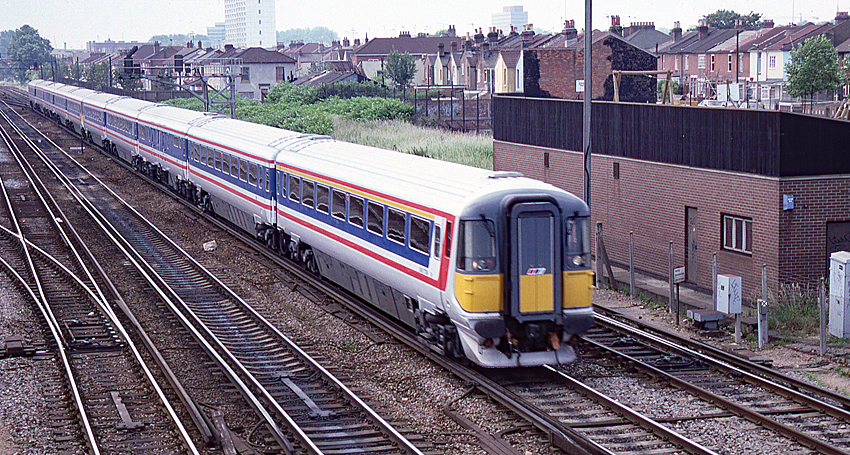
A Class 442 Wessex Electric

The narration then stops as a montage of aerial shots set to Vangelis' score is shown. The voiceover then restarts with a commentary of commuter trains, including the newly introduced Class 442 Wessex Electrics:

Passenger trains full of commuters,
bound for the office to work in computers.
The teacher, the doctor, the actor in farce,
the typist, the banker, the judge in first class.
Reading The Times with the crossword to do,
returning at night on the six forty-two.

The advert then ends with a shot of disembarking passengers, and a title card with the slogan "Britain's Railway".

== Release ==
The advert premiered in the UK at 9pm on Christmas Day 1988. It became apparent that the 2½ minute running time (as well as being expensive to air) limited the amount of showings it could receive, so an abridged 90 second version was later released.

== See also ==
- Age Of The Train
