= Travelling Post Office =

Railway vehicles for sorting and transporting mail

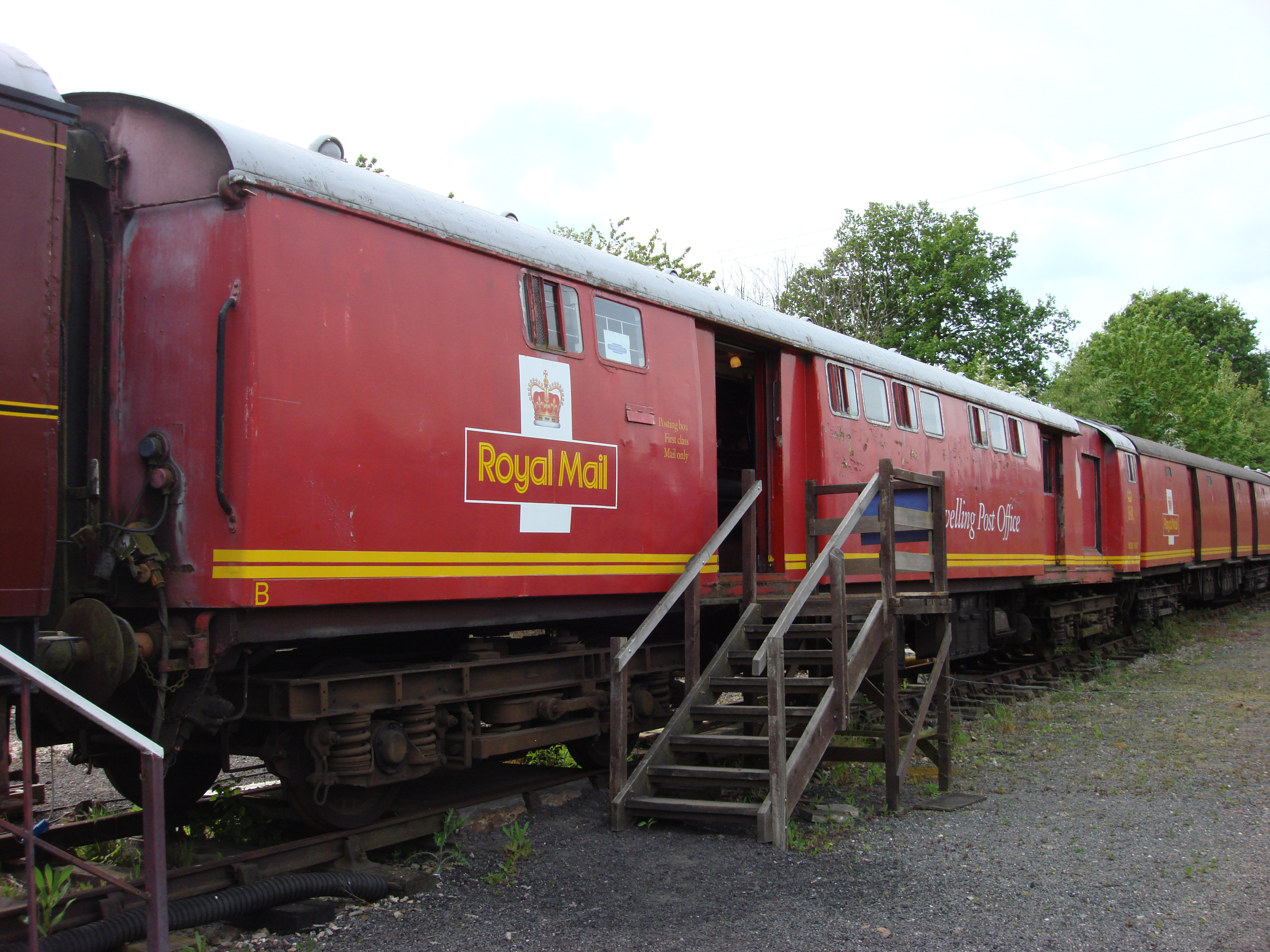
TPO at the Colne Valley Railway. Visible to the right of the Royal Mail logo is the letter box, for first class post only.

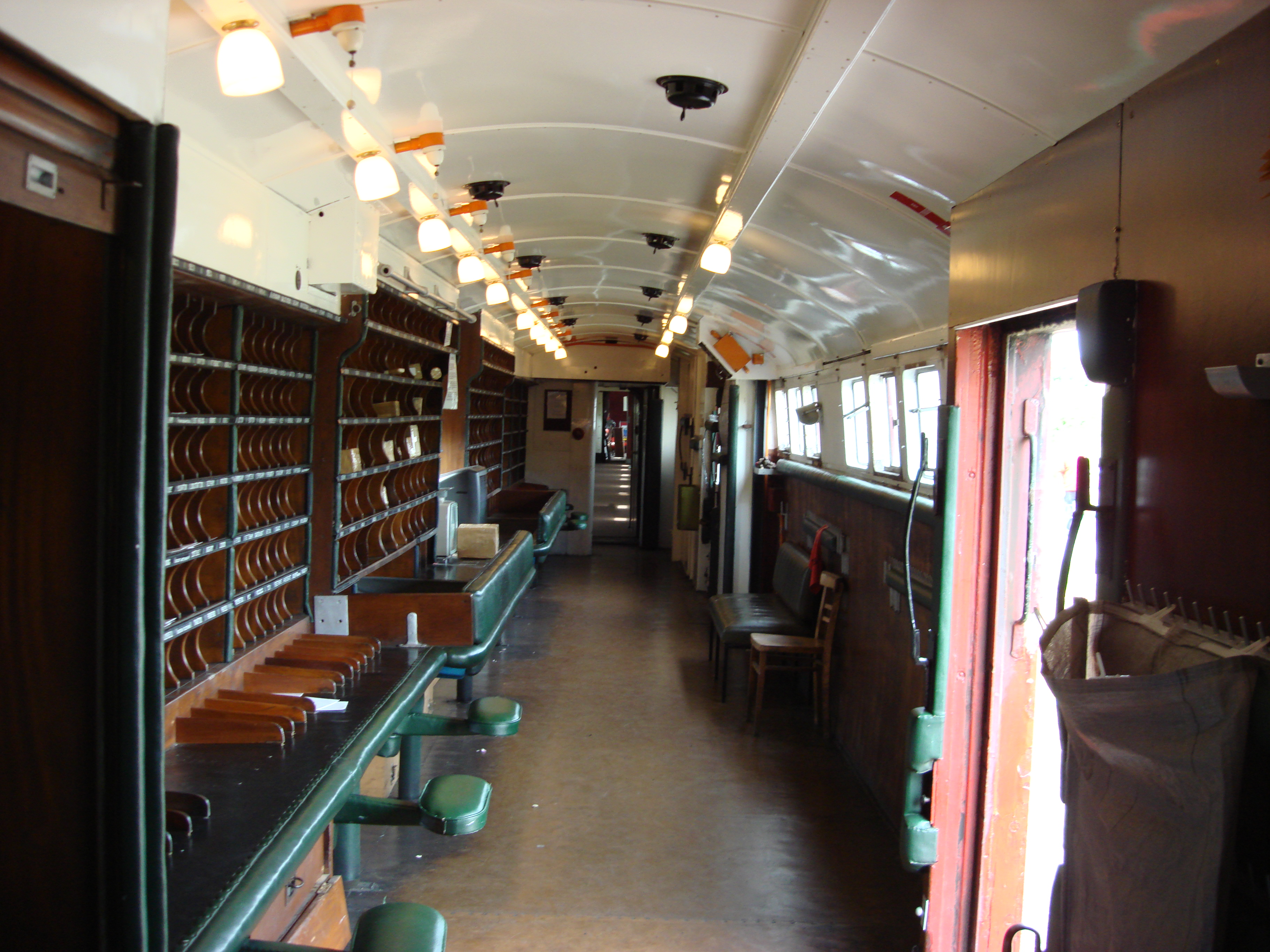
TPO interior

A Travelling Post Office (TPO) was a type of mail train used in Great Britain and Ireland where the post was sorted en route, used from 1830 to 1996.

The TPO can be traced back to the earlier days of the railway, the first ever postal movement by rail being performed by the Liverpool and Manchester Railway (L&MR) on 11 November 1830. The Railways (Conveyance of Mails) Act 1838 obliged railway companies to carry mail, and thus specialised rolling stock was quickly provided; the first true TPO emerged that same year. Further innovations followed, such as the development of lineside apparatus for picking up and setting down mailbags while underway, and the use of dedicated mail trains. By 1914, there were 126 TPO carriages in operation throughout the United Kingdom, while numerous other nations had adopted the concept, wholly or in part, as well.

During the latter part of the twentieth century, rail mail was subject to various changes. In Britain, Rail Express Systems (RES) was formed during the 1980s to rejuvenate the market, streamlining and centralising rail mail services, resulting in TPO coverage decreasing over the following years. During the 1990s, the Royal Mail, Britain's main customer for TPOs, ordered 16 four-car British Rail Class 325 electric multiple units to replace locomotive-hauled counterparts in handling parcels. However, wider economic factors, including increasingly effective mechanical sorting methods in comparison to the TPO's manual sorting by hand, along with operational safety concerns, made it increasingly unattractive to continue operating such services. Accordingly, the night of the 9/10 January 2004 saw the final TPO services run in Great Britain, with the carriages themselves used then sold for scrap or to preservation societies. The final load of mail to be loaded aboard a travelling post office was the consignment by air from Scotland via Bristol airport, put aboard the TPO at Yatton Station, Somerset in the early hours of 10 January 2004.

== History ==
=== Origins ===
On 11 November 1830, the first ever postal movement by rail was made by the Liverpool and Manchester Railway (L&MR), which had come to an agreement with the General Post Office (GPO) to move their mail upon L&MR services. It quickly became apparent that the railways were providing a much faster method of conveying letters across the country than traditional horse-drawn coaches. Accordingly, the carriage of mail by train in Great Britain became a routine event within a matter of years. Initially, the movement of mail was at the choice of individual railway companies, being able to accept or refuse to do so at their discretion. In these early years, the mail would arrive by road in a mail coach which would simply be loaded (together with its guard) on to a flat-bed truck attached to the back of the train.

The passing of the Railways (Conveyance of Mails) Act 1838 substantially reshaped the rail mail market. Chiefly, it required all railway companies to carry mail, either by ordinary or special trains, as required by the Postmaster General; however, this act did not stipulate what was to be charged for such services. In addition to making it mandatory for railway companies to carry mail, the act also required the provision of carriages fitted for sorting it as required; to handle this new obligation, these companies quickly developed specialised rolling stock for the task.

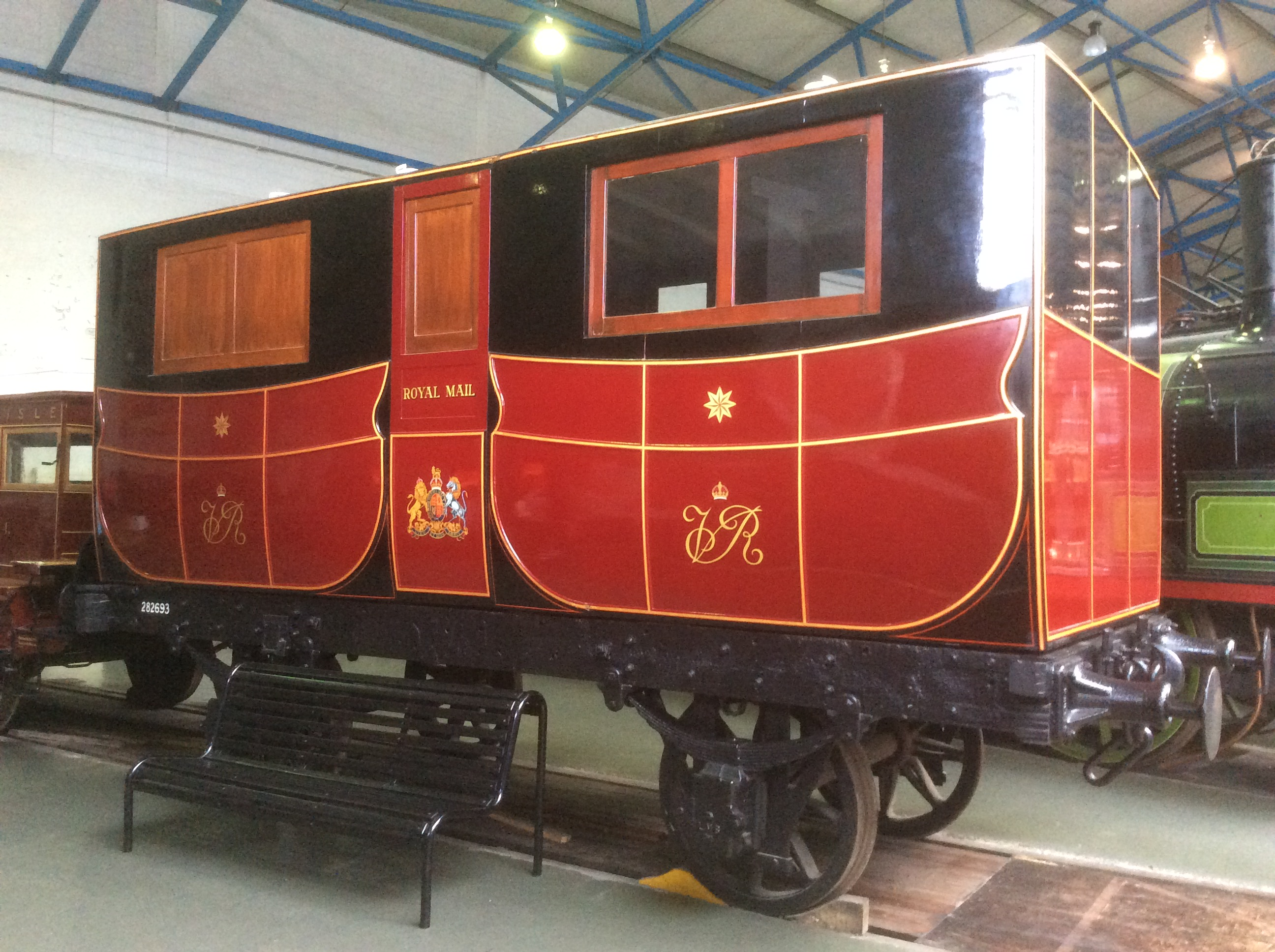
Replica 1838 Grand Junction Railway travelling post office van (constructed in 1938) on display in the National Railway Museum.

According to industry periodical Rail Magazine, the first Travelling Post Office (TPO) carriage emerged during 1838, and credited George Kastadt, a surveyor employed by the GPO, with the concept. On 6 January 1838, Kastadt proposed a trial of a 'travelling office', of which the first run was conducted just weeks later. The advantage of this innovation was that time could be saved by sorting mail while it was being transported, rather than separately sorting it either beforehand or afterwards and thus taking more time to do so. This initial TPO was a converted horse box and was initially operated on the Grand Junction Railway. Karstadt's son was one of two mail clerks who did the sorting.

During 1845, the Midland Railway decided to extend their TPO services via Derby to Newcastle upon Tyne; and soon after reached Scotland. The first special postal train was operated by the Great Western Railway between London and Bristol; the inaugural train ran on 1 February 1855, leaving Paddington station at 20:46, and arriving at Bristol at 00:30.

Prior to 1885, it was common practice for TPO carriages to be added to consists of normal passenger services. That same year, the first dedicated Mail Special was conducted. Early on, the TPOs were relatively barebones in terms of their onboard facilities. Internal space was limited and prioritised for the principal purpose of sorting mail, thus measures to enhance staff comfort was typically more of an afterthought. Initially, toilets were not even provided, although this position was reportedly reversed after the accidental death of a postal worker while relieving himself at the rear of a TPO.

=== Expansion and decline ===
While rail mail had emerged in Britain, the country was quickly followed by many of the member nations within the British Commonwealth along with various third party countries. TPOs were usually equipped with letter boxes, enabling people in stations to post mail whilst the train was stationary. The post-marks from TPOs are valued by philatelists.

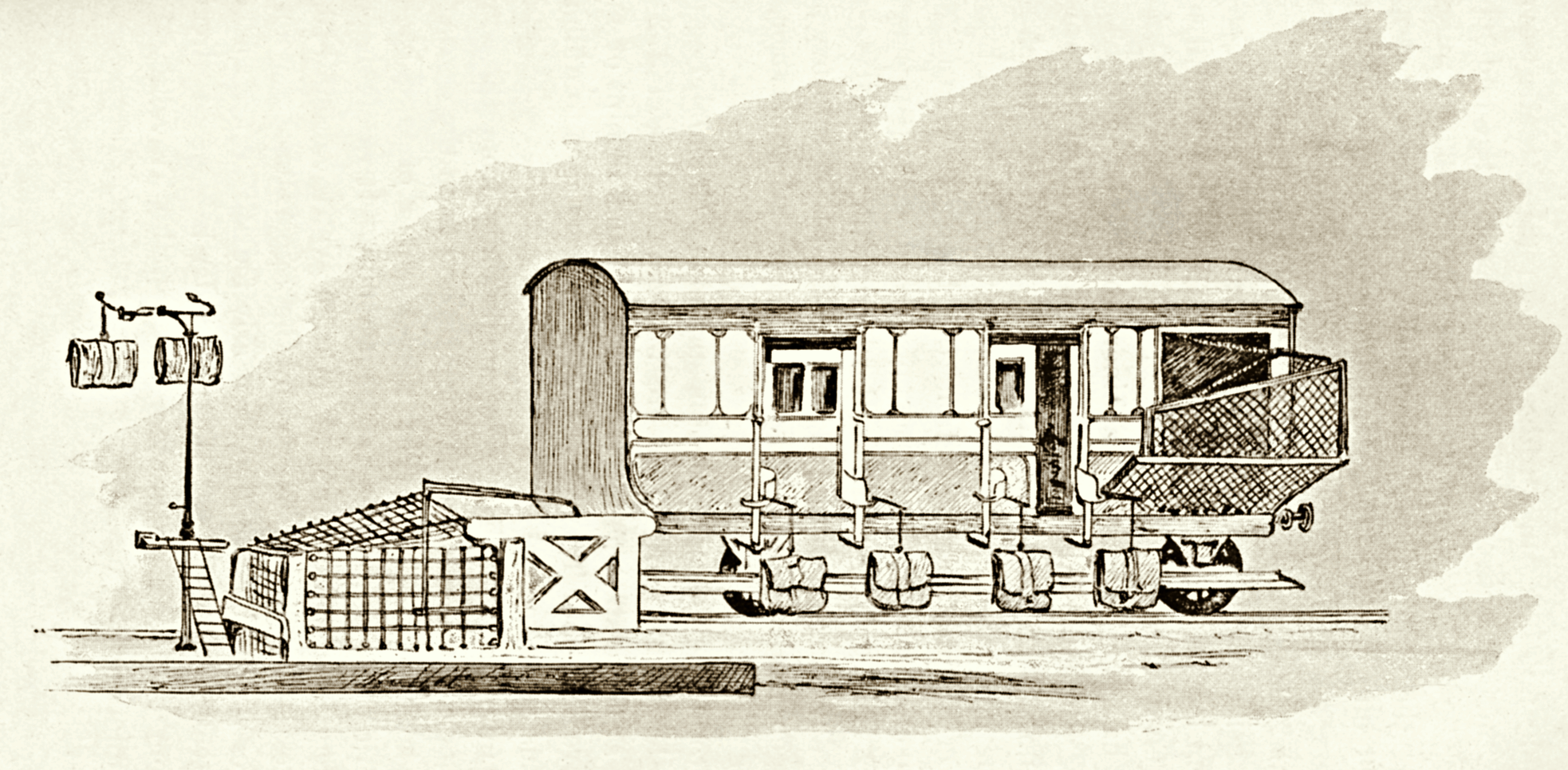
A TPO, circa 1890, showing the equipment used for transferring the mail bags to and from the train whilst it was travelling at full speed

During 1866, apparatus for picking up and setting down mailbags without stopping was installed at Slough and Maidenhead. This concept had first been patented in 1838 by Nathaniel Worsdell, first deputy mayor of Crewe, and carriage and wagon superintendent at Crewe Works. Use of the system became prevalent over the following decades, it became commonplace for TPO carriages to be fitted with several for handling automated mail pickups/dropoffs, sometimes being furnished with four separate arms per carriage.

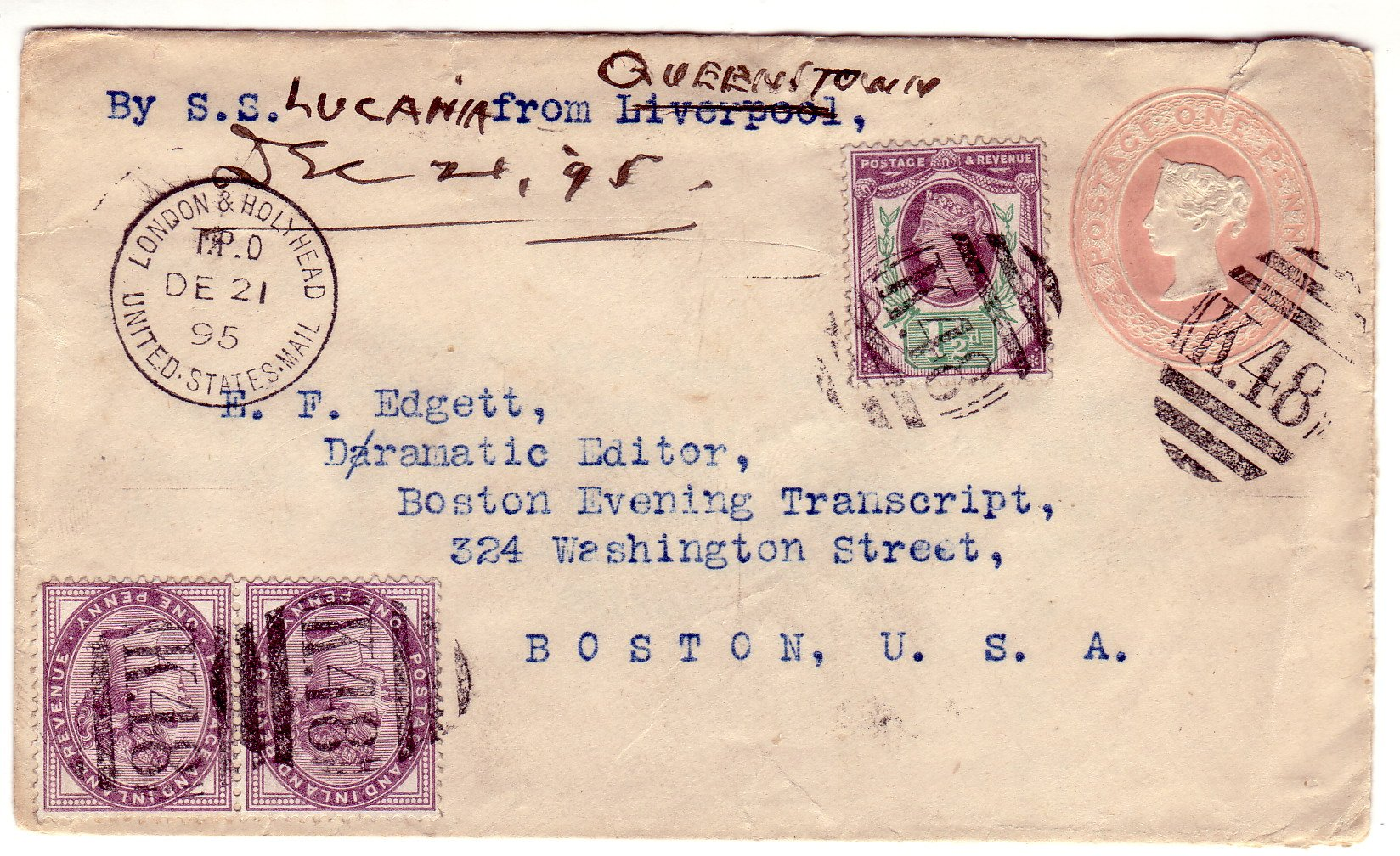
A 1895 cover postmarked on the London & Holyhead TPO to be placed on board ship at Queenstown, in Cork, per the manuscript annotation

By 1914, there were 126 TPO carriages in operation throughout the United Kingdom. They were only referred to as TPOs for the first time in 1928, prior to this, the common term for mail carriages had been Railway Post Offices (RPOs).

Following the nationalisation of the railways and the formation of British Rail (BR) in the late 1940s, TPOs continued to be operated by this new state-owned company. However, it was during the BR era that the transportation of mail by rail acquired a negative reputation for unreliability due to services frequently experiencing delays, typically resulting in late arrivals.

By 1963, the year of the Great Train Robbery, there were 49 mail trains in service, with between one and five TPOs being typically attached to passenger trains, while complete TPO trains were routinely being operated between London and Aberdeen and Penzance. The final mail drop from a moving train using automatic apparatus was carried out on 4 October 1971 at a location just north of Penrith. Although there were in excess of 40 TPOs running at this time, item transfers were only carried out at stations after this date.

During the 1980s, BR planners endeavoured to rejuvenate numerous aspects of its operations and to better fulfil customer demands. Under the policy of Sectorisation, the TPOS and all rail mail operations were consolidated into their own business unit, Rail Express Systems (RES). This reorganisation under its own management team led to a new focus of its operations on the specific needs of its primary customer, the Royal Mail (RM).

Seeking to rejuvenate rail mail, RES devised a £150 million strategy that focused on long-distance services that worked in conjunction with a central hub based in London at its heart, known as Railnet. During late 1993, RED and RM had signed a 13-year deal with RES to operate the trains from this new hub, also referred to as the London Distribution Centre or the Princess Royal Distribution Centre, at Stonebridge Park, near Wembley. Furthermore, RM commissioned ABB to manufacture 16 four-car British Rail Class 325 electric multiple units, which were designed specifically for the transport of pre-sorted mail.

=== Post-privatisation of British Rail ===
Following the privatisation of British Rail in the mid 1990s, all British TPOs were acquired along with RES by the privately owned company English, Welsh & Scottish Railway (EWS) in February 1996. Following the opening of the new London hub on 30 September 1996, British rail mail operations were drastically restructured; only dedicated mail trains were operated after this date while TPOs were no longer based at any main line stations, as it had been decided to centrally base all London TPOs at the hub instead. Accordingly, the final TPO services departed King's Cross, Euston, Liverpool Street and Paddington stations on 27 September 1996.

The restructuring of services, intended to enable the faster delivery of mail to distant destinations, necessitated the streamlining of both mail pick-ups and drop-offs, a policy which resulted in many intermediate locations seeing the permanent withdrawal of coverage by TPOs. Instead, mail was to be transported by road to the 45 stations that would be served by the remaining TPO services. Despite this, the increasing efficiency of mechanical sorting in comparison to the hand sorting methods used onboard TPOs meant that the latter was becoming increasingly uneconomic regardless of these changes.

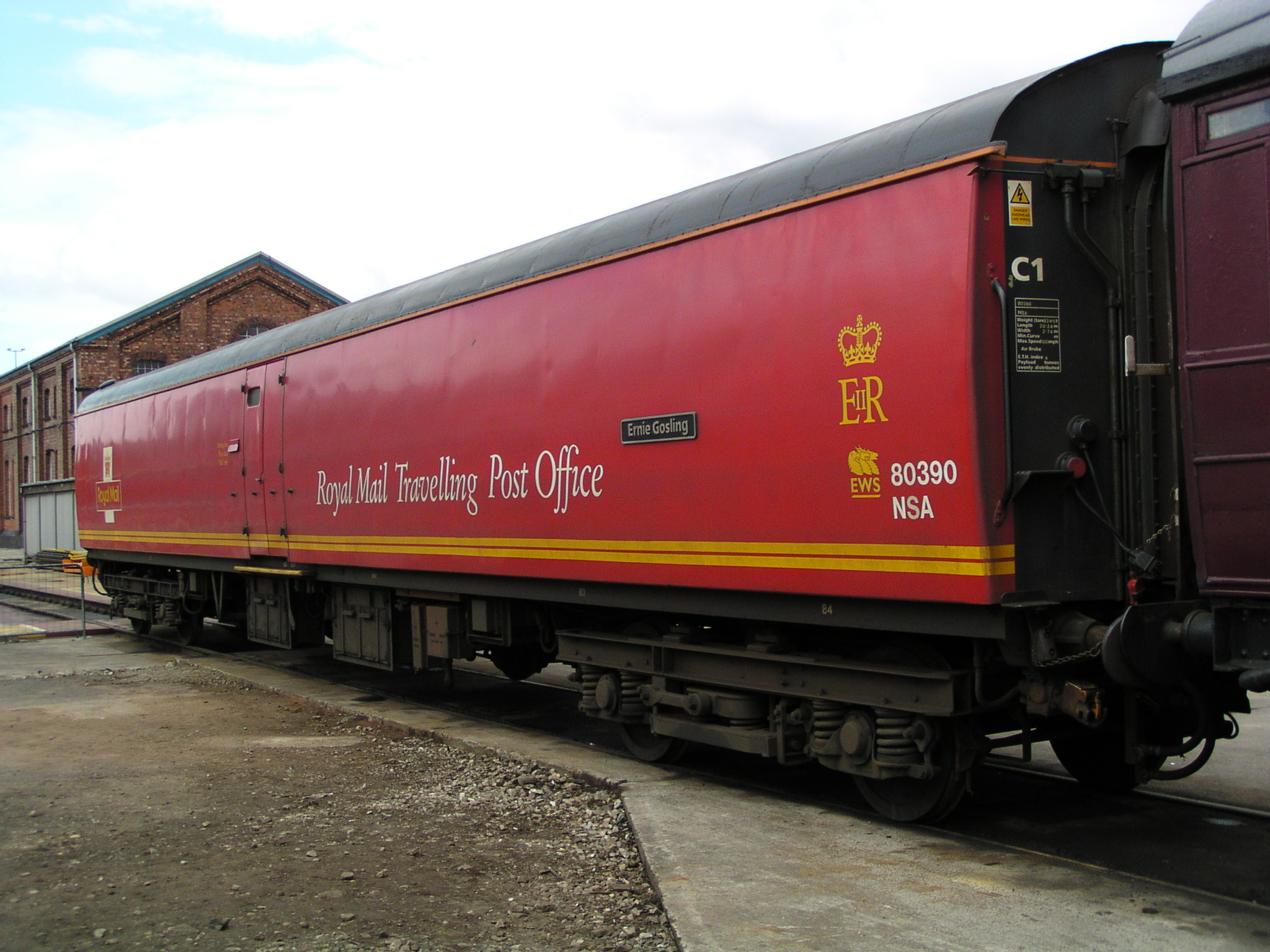
British Rail TPO vehicle NSA 80390 on display at Doncaster Works open day in 2003. This type of vehicle, based on the British Rail Mark 1 coach, was the final design of TPO vehicle used in the United Kingdom.

A further factor that negatively impacted TPO operations was the Hatfield rail crash during October 2000, which led to numerous restrictions being imposed upon TPOs, including new speed limitations and numerous cancellations across many routes. There were also rising concerns over wellbeing of workers within TPOs, as there was little consideration towards crashworthiness or the wellbeing of the occupants in the event of a major accident. Furthermore, RM had increasingly decided to make use of other means of transporting mail, including aircraft and road vehicles.

Amid these various factors, during 2003, it was announced that Royal Mail had decided to suspend all transportation of mail by rail. The discontinuation of TPOs reportedly saved RM £10m per year, while the contract to operate them reportedly equated to 10 per cent of EWS’ overall business, representing a major loss to the company. The last TPO services went out on the night of 9 January 2004, marking the end of sorting of mail on trains in Britain.

However, Royal Mail did restore the movement of some already-sorted letters by rail in time for the Christmas season that year, contracting with EWS's competitor GB Railfreight to resume bulk transfer services along the West Coast Main Line between its mail terminals at London (Willesden), Warrington and Glasgow (Sheildmuir) using the dedicated Class 325 electric multiple units that had been in operation since 1996. In 2009, the contract for these mail trains was transferred to EWS's successor DB Schenker Rail. For flexibility, Royal Mail had preserved rail access to its distribution centres on Tyneside (Low Fell) and at Tonbridge in Kent, and did occasionally send mail trains to Low Fell, for example when Newcastle Airport was closed by snow. In June 2013, a regular service resumed from Low Fell. Royal Mail ceased operation of its own dedicated mail trains in 2024; post is still moved on regular rail services, however.

== Ireland ==
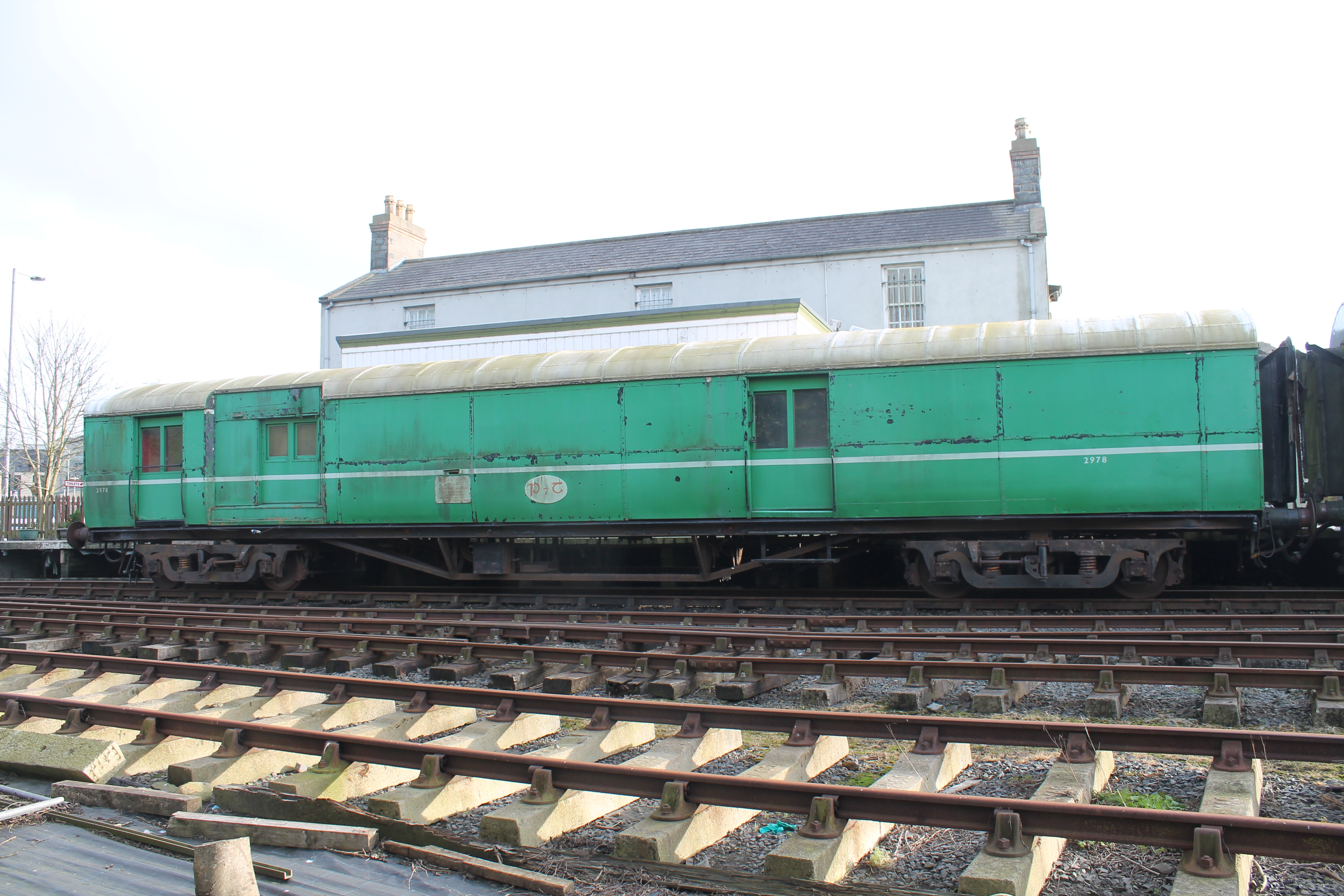
Former An Post travelling post office at the Downpatrick and County Down Railway. Note the P⁊T logo of the Irish Department of Posts and Telegraphs.

The carrying of mail by train commenced on 6 April 1835 and early TPOs began on Irish trains on the Dublin to Cork line on 1 January 1855, though general post-carrying vehicles had been around since the early days of the Dublin and Kingstown Railway. By 1910, a total of 13 TPOs were in operation throughout the country.

In 1958, Coras Iompair Eireann built four modern TPOs for Department of Posts and Telegraphs at their Inchicore Works. Some time before their withdrawal it had been decided that two would be dedicated to use on the Cork Mail and two to the Galway Mail, both of which originated from Connolly station in Dublin. The movement of post by rail in Ireland ended in 1994 with the last day mails on 14 January and the final operational night mails on 17 January on both the Cork and Galway routes.

Two of the 1958-built TPOs survived into preservation- 2977 of the Cork Mails and 2978 of the Galway Mails. Both are at the Downpatrick and County Down Railway, who own 2978, whilst 2977 is still owned by An Post.

== Preservation ==
Several Royal Mail TPOs have been preserved along with stowage vans and general utility vans (GUVs). Only one PCV (Propelling Control Vehicle) remains, currently at the Mid-Norfolk Railway. At these preserved lines the TPOs can be seen performing a live drop off/pick up from a preserved lineside apparatus. The Great Central Railway and the Nene Valley Railway are leading this endeavour with many weekends devoted to Mail by Rail. Other lines are following in their wake.

== TPO vehicles ==
TPOs were formed of several different types of vehicle:

- Post Office sorting van
- Post Office stowage van
- Brake Post Office stowage van
- Propelling control vehicle
- Brake van
- General utility van

== See also ==
- Great Central Steam Railway - where the Travelling Post Office and Mail Exchange on the Move is recreated
- Great Train Robbery (1963) - in which £2.3 million was stolen from a Glasgow to London TPO train
- Night Mail - Film and poem about Travelling Post Office
- Railways (Conveyance of Mails) Act 1838
- Railway post office - North American term for cars that served similar functions.
- SNCF TGV La Poste - French Post Office dedicated TGV sets.
- British Rail Class 325 - Royal Mail EMUs used in Britain.
- London Post Office Railway - that Royal Mail used to transport mail across London on private underground tracks.
- Nene Valley Railway - where visitors can ride the TPOs and get off at a remote exchange point to watch the mail pickup/drop off.
