= The General Line =

1929 Soviet drama film

- Film poster
- Directed by: Grigori Aleksandrov; Sergei M. Eisenstein
- Written by: Grigori Aleksandrov; Sergei M. Eisenstein
- Starring: Martha Lapkina; M. Ivanin; Konstantin Vasilyev; Vasili Buzenkov
- Cinematography: Eduard Tisse
- Release date: 1929
- Running time: 121 minutes
- Country: Soviet Union
- Language: Silent film

The General Line, also known as Old and New (Russian: Старое и новое, romanized: Staroye i novoye), is a 1929 Soviet propaganda film directed by Sergei Eisenstein and Grigori Aleksandrov.

The General Line was begun in 1927 as a celebration of the collectivization of agriculture, as championed by old-line Bolshevik Leon Trotsky. Hoping to reach a wide audience, the director forsook his usual practice of emphasizing groups by concentrating on a single rural heroine. Eisenstein briefly abandoned this project to film October: Ten Days That Shook the World, in honour of the 10th anniversary of the Revolution. By the time he was able to return to this film, the Party's attitudes had changed and Trotsky had fallen from grace. As a result, the film was hastily re-edited and sent out in 1929 under a new title, The Old and the New. In later years, archivists restored The General Line to an approximation of Eisenstein's original concept. Much of the director's montage-like imagery—such as using simple props to trace the progress from the agrarian customs of the 19th-century to the more mechanized procedures of the 20th—was common to both versions of the film.

== Plot ==
The General Line (1929)

When Martha's father dies and the inheritance is distributed, she is only left with a cow and a tiny piece of land that is hard to manage. In order to earn at least a minimum income, she asks a rich kulak for some help. She only needs a horse to till her small field. But the hard-hearted man does not even listen to her. Out of sheer despair, Martha wonders if there could be other ways to a promising agriculture.

One day a revolutionary awakens in Martha. Together with four other farmers who are in a similarly precarious situation, they set up their own kolkhoz. Time and again there are setbacks, but gradually the benefits of this production community are apparent to all parties involved. The cooperative becomes the model for effective agriculture, and an increasing number of local farmers are joining it. Soon they can even afford a tractor to optimally manage the fields. On the other hand, many around them, such as the deeply faithful and the priests, seem like worn down relics of long past times.

== Cast ==
- Martha Lapkina as Martha
- M. Ivanin as Martha's son
- Konstantin Vasilyev as tractor-driver
- Neyninkov as Miroshkin
- Chukamaryev as butcher
- Ivan Yudin as komsomol member
- E. Sukhareva as witch
- G. Matvey as priest

== Production ==
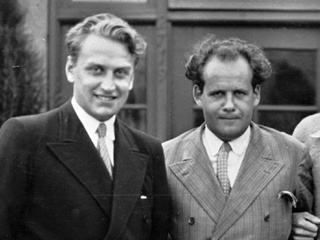
Directors Grigori Aleksandrov (left) and director Sergei Eisenstein (right) in 1930

At first Eisenstein considered hiring a professional actress for the lead role. But when the first question was asked during casting: "Can you milk cows, plough, guide a tractor?" all of them would confidently reply "No". After this he decided to cast farm worker Martha Lapkina, who had never starred in film, for the role.

== Reception ==
In a 2008 survey by Seans magazine, director Aleksei Khanyutin listed it third among his 10 favourite Russian films.
