= Gafencu =

Gafencu is a Romanian surname that may refer to:

- Eduard Gafencu (born 1993), Romanian kickboxer and boxer
- Grigore Gafencu (1892–1957), Romanian politician, diplomat, and journalist
- Liliana Gafencu (born 1975), Romanian rower
- Valeriu Gafencu (1921–1952), Romanian Orthodox theologian and Legionnaire
- Vasile Gafencu (1886–1942), Bessarabian politician
