= Bălănești =

Bălăneşti may refer to several places:

== Romania ==
- Bălănești, Gorj, a commune in Gorj County
- Bălăneşti, a village in Dealu Morii Commune, Bacău County
- Bălăneşti, a village in Podu Turcului Commune, Bacău County
- Bălăneşti, a village in Cozieni Commune, Buzău County
- Bălăneşti, a village in the town of Răcari, Dâmboviţa County
- Bălăneşti, a village in Bârgăuani Commune, Neamţ County
- Bălăneşti, a village in Mărunței Commune, Olt County
- Bălăneşti, a village in Gura Caliței Commune, Vrancea County

== Moldova ==
- Bălănești, Nisporeni, a commune in Nisporeni district
- Bălănești Hill, the highest hill in the country
