= Albot =

Albot is a Moldovan surname. Notable people with the surname include:

- Nata Albot (born 1979), Moldovan blogger, journalist, and producer
- Radu Albot (born 1989), Moldovan tennis player

== See also ==
- Albor
- Allot (surname)
