= Ion Țurcanu =

Moldovan writer and politician

Ion Țurcanu OR
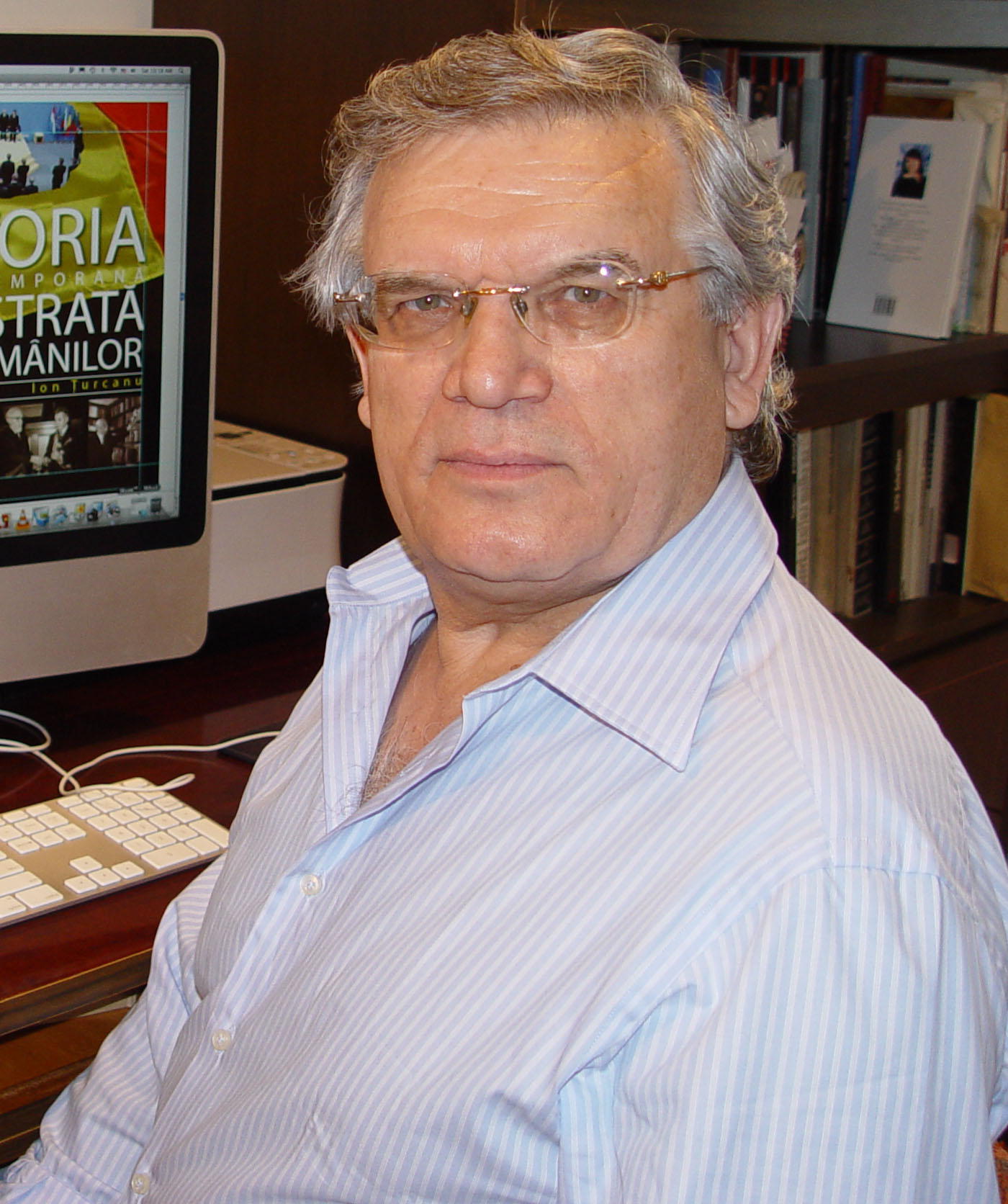
- Țurcanu in 2016

Member of the Moldovan Parliament
- In office 17 April 1990 – 29 March 1994
- Parliamentary group: Popular Front
- Constituency: Strășeni

Personal details
- Born: January 15, 1946 (age 80) Găureni, Moldavian SSR, Soviet Union
- Party: Working People's Party
- Other political affiliations: Moldavian Democratic Movement
- Education: Moldova State University

Ion Țurcanu (born 15 January 1946) is an author, educator, historian, memoirist, professor, former member of the Parliament (1990–1994), politician and Romanian writer from Moldova. He is one of the 277 MPs of the first parliament of the former Soviet Socialist Republic (later the Republic of Moldova), who voted for the Declaration of Independence of the Republic of Moldova on 27 August 1991.

== Biography ==
Țurcanu was born on January 15, 1946, in Găurenii de Sus, former Lăpușna County. He graduated from Moldova State University in 1969 and obtained his doctorate in history in 1975. He started work as a teacher in the village Bărboieni, Nisporeni District. After obtaining his PhD, he became a senior lecturer, then lecturer at the Pedagogical Institute "Ion Creangă". In the years 1993–1997, he worked at the History Institute of the Academy of Sciences of Moldova. Since 2001, he returned to his professorial career in higher education, this time at Moldova State University.

He participated in the creation, in 1988, of the Democratic Movement in Support of the Perestroika, (the future Moldovan Popular Front). In the years 1987–1990 he published a series of articles in the Chișinău press to inform the population on the thorny subjects of the history of Bessarabia, and that of all Romanians. In the same context he initiated a critique of the historiographical Soviet propaganda that falsified the historical themes mentioned above. In the years 1990–1994 he was a Member and Secretary of the Parliament. In 1998, he established the New Moldavian National Party, which participated in the local elections in 1999 and parliamentary ones in 2001, but without obtaining significant results.

Țurcanu was the editor of the publishing house "Moldovan Book" (1989–1990), and director of the publishing house "Universitas" (1993–1996). In the 1990–1993 he published, as editor, the historical journals "Patrimoniu" "Magazine of History of Moldova." He published a number of studies and books on various historical subjects: the political events in Bessarabia in 1917–1918, Bessarabian agrarian relations during the interwar period, the Bessarabian famine of 1946–1947, the resistance movement against Soviet occupation of Bessarabia during 1944–1953, political and ethnic relations east of the Carpathians in the period preceding the founding of the Romanian state of Moldova, the Greco-Roman antiquity on the Lower Dniester and the neighboring territories, the philosophy of history from the perspective of some Romanian thinkers, historical bibliography of Bessarabia and Transnistria, social and political realities in modern Moldova etc. He wrote several syntheses of Romanian history. He also had some literary preoccupations, which occurred occasionally and with great interruptions.

== Works ==
- Развитие материальной базы культуры села Молдавской ССР (1951–1970), Chișinău, 1978.
- Satul basarabean. Studii social-economice (1918–1940), Chișinău, 1980.
- Relații agrare din Basarabia în anii 1918–1940, Chișinău, 1991.
- Foametea din Basarabia în anii 1946–1947. Mecanismul organizării ei, Chișinău, 1993.
- Creangă în contextul pedagogiei timpului său, Chișinău, 1994.
- Basarabia din nou în fața opțiunii istorice, Chișinău, 1994.
- Unirea Basarabiei cu România în anul 1918. Preludii, premise, realizări, Chișinău, 1998.
- Moldova antisovietică. Aspecte din lupta basarabenilor împotriva ocupației sovietice. 1944–1953, Chișinău, 2000.
- Republica Moldova independentă (1991–2001), Chișinău, 2001.
- Istoricitatea istoriografiei. Observații asupra scrisului istoric basarabean, Chișinău, 2004.
- Bibliografia istorică a Basarabiei și Transnistriei, Chișinău, 2005.
- Cartea-album Ștefan cel Mare, Chișinău, 2005.
- Istoria relațiilor internaționale, Chișinău, 2005.
- Istoria: receptare, cercetare, interpretare, Iași, 2006.
- Istoria românilor (cu o privire mai largă asupra culturii), Brăila, 2007.
- Istoria ilustrată a românilor. De la origini pînă la Marea Unire, Chișinău/București, 2007.
- Istoria contemporană ilustrată a românilor, Brăila, 2010.
- În căutarea originii numelui Basarabia, Chișinău, 2010.
- Descrierea Basarabiei, Chișinău, 2011.
- Bessarabiana. Teritoriul dintre Prut și Nistru în cîteva ipostaze istorice și reflecții istoriografice, Chișinău, 2012.
- Republica Moldova: a fi sau a nu fi, Chișinău, 2012.
- Istoria istoriilor mele, Chișinău, 2013.
- Istoria Basarabiei, Vol. 1: Preludii. Din paleolitic până la sfârșitul Antichității, Chișinău 2016 (from early palaeolithic to late antiquity).
