= Lebedev-Kumach =

Lebedev-Kumach may refer to:

- Vasily Lebedev-Kumach, (1898–1949), a Russian poet and lyricist
- 5076 Lebedev-Kumach, an asteroid
