= Gura Slănic mine =

Salt mine in Bacău County, Romania

- Interactive map of Gura Slănic mine
- Location: Târgu Ocna, Bacău County, Romania; 45°14′08″N 25°56′30″E
- Products: Sodium chloride
- Company: Salrom

The Gura Slănic mine is a large salt mine located in eastern Romania in Bacău County, close to Târgu Ocna. Gura Slănic represents one of the largest salt reserves in Romania having estimated reserves of 1 billion tonnes of NaCl.
