= Life has become better =

Phrase uttered by Joseph Stalin in 1935

Footage of the speech

"Life has become better, life has become joyous" (Note: Russian: Жить стало лучше, жить стало веселей, romanized: Žitj stalo lučše, žitj stalo veselej, IPA: [ʐɨtʲ ˈstalə ˈlutʂːɨ ʐɨtʲ ˈstalə vʲɪsʲɪˈlʲej]) is a widespread version of a phrase uttered by Soviet leader Joseph Stalin at the First All-Union Conference of Stakhanovites on 17 November 1935. The full quote from Joseph Stalin was, when translated into English, is:

Life has improved, comrades. Life has become more joyous. And when life is joyous, work goes well. Hence the high rates of output. Hence the heroes and heroines of labour. That, primarily, is the root of the Stakhanov movement. If there had been a crisis in our country, if there had been unemployment - that scourge of the working class - if people in our country lived badly, drably, joylessly, we should have had nothing like the Stakhanov movement.

In modern Russian the phrase is used in an ironical sense.

== Song ==
"Life's Become Better"

Song
- Language: Russian
- Written: c. 1936
- Songwriter: Vasily Lebedev-Kumach
- Composer: Alexander Alexandrov

In 1936, the words were used in the chorus of a song of the same name, with music by Alexander Alexandrov and lyrics by Vasily Lebedev-Kumach. The opening bars of the song and some sequences share a notable resemblance to those of the State Anthem of the Soviet Union, as the two songs had the same composer. Alexandrov apparently liked the opening bars of this piece. He used them again, with only minor alterations, just a few years later in the tune for the State Anthem (1944–1991).

=== Song lyrics sample ===
Russian original

Звонки, как птицы, одна за другой,
Песни летят над советской страной!

Припев:
𝄆 Весел напев городов и полей,
Жить стало лучше, жить стало веселей! 𝄇

Дружно страна и растёт, и поёт,
С песнею новое счастье куёт!
(С песнями общее счастье куёт!)

Припев:
𝄆 Глянешь на солнце – и солнце светлей,
Жить стало лучше, жить стало веселей! 𝄇

Romanization of Russian

Zvonki, kak ptitsy, odna za drugoy,
Pesni letyat nad sovetskoy stranoy!

Pripev:
𝄆 Vesel napev gorodov i poley,
Zhit' stalo luchshe, zhit' stalo veseley! 𝄇

Druzhno strana i rastyot, i poyot,
S pesneyu novoye schastye kuyot!
(S pesnyami obshcheye schastye kuyot!)

Pripev:
𝄆 Glyanesh' na solnce – i solnce svetley,
Zhit' stalo luchshe, zhit' stalo veseley! 𝄇

English translation

Jingly, like birds, one by one,
Songs fly over the Soviet land!

Chorus:
𝄆 Happy is the song of cities and fields,
Life's become better, life's become more joyous! 𝄇

Our friendly country grows and sings,
And with their song forge a new happiness!
(And with their songs forge a common happiness!)

Chorus:
𝄆 When you look at the sun, it's brighter,
Life's become better, life's become more joyous! 𝄇

A 1936 song recording

== See also ==
- Anthem of the Bolshevik Party
- National anthem of Russia
