= Rodica Ciorănică =

Moldovan journalist (born 1976)

Rodica Ciorănică-Gavriliţă
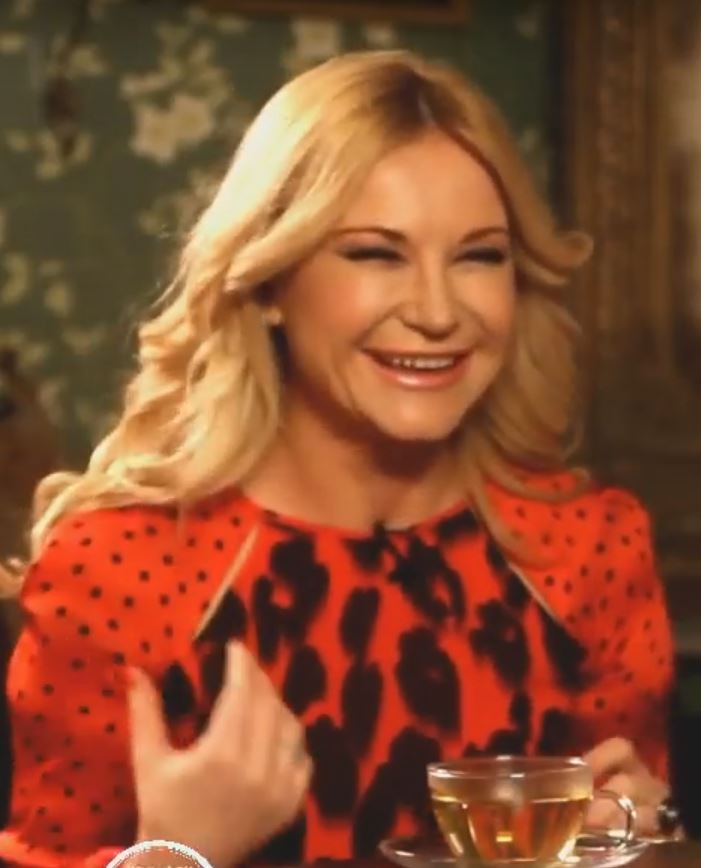
- Ciorănică in 2016
- Born: 25 March 1976 (age 50); Tartaul, Moldavian SSR, Soviet Union
- Citizenship: Moldova, Romania
- Education: Moldova State University
- Occupation: Editor
- Known for: her activity as an editor
- Spouse: Sergiu Gavriliţă
- Children: 1
- Relatives: Sergiu Mocanu

Rodica Ciorănică-Gavriliţă (born 25 March 1976) is a journalist and editor from Moldova. She founded VIP Magazin in 2004. Since 2007, she has had a TV show on Pro TV Chişinău and then on Prime TV. Rodica Ciorănică is the head of VIP Magazin Grup. Besides VIP Magazin, she edits two other magazines, 50 cei mai influenti Moldoveni (The 50 most influential Moldavians) and 99 femei din Moldova (99 women from Moldova). She is married to Sergiu Gavriliţă (their marriage godfather being Sergiu Mocanu) and they have a daughter.

== Awards ==
- Premiul „Managerul anului 2007” oferit de Centrul Independent de Jurnalism și Comitetul pentru Libertatea Presei
- Premiul „Speranța anului în jurnalism”, oferit de CIJ, 1998
- Premiul VIP 2004 pentru „Cel mai reușit debut în presa scrisă”,
- Premiul „Iurie Matei” pentru Jurnalism, 2006.
