= Chubchik (song) =

Russian folk song

"Chubchik" (Russian: Чубчик), also "Curly chubchik" (Russian: Чубчик кучерявый, romanized: Chubchik kucheryavy) is a Russian folk blatnaya pesnya (a song of criminal subculture) of unknown authorship. It was performed by many famous Russian singers, both in Russia and in Russian diaspora, with varying lyrics, the most notable version belonging to Pyotr Leshchenko.

It is a song about a dashing thief with curly chubchik (forelock), who ended up in Siberia. The approximate time of the origin of the song may be deduced from the fact that it mentions the jury trial, which existed in Russia from 1866 until the Russian Revolution of 1917.

== Notable performers ==
- Munia Serebroff, "Chupchik", a Brunswick record 51913-В, New York 1927, the earliest known recorded version

Чубчик, чубчик, чубчик кучерявый,
Разве можно чубчик не любить?!
Раньше девки чубчик все любили
До сих пор не могут позабыть.

Так бывало, одену картуз я на затылок,
И пойду я погулять в лесок.
А чубчик, чубчик, чубчик так и вьется,
Так и вьется, словно ветерок.

Но я не знаю, как это случилось,
До сих пор того не разберешь.
Из-за бабы, скверной и лукавой,
Сам всадил товарищу я нож.

Пока же меня за чубчик захватили
И с тех пор мне света не видать.
На суде присяжные решили
На двадцать лет в Сибирь меня послать.

Но я Сибири, Сибири не боюся,
Сибирь ведь тоже русская страна.
Так вейся, вейся, чубчик кучерявый,
Развевайся весел, как и я.

- David Medov
- Yuri Morfessi , 1930
- Pyotr Leshchenko, 1933; he performed it much earlier

Чубчик, чубчик, чубчик кучерявый
Развевайся, чубчик, по ветру
Раньше, чубчик, я тебя любила
О тебе забыть я не могу

Бывало, шапку оденешь на затылок
Пойдёшь гулять ты днём иль вечерком
Из-под шапки чубчик так и вьётся
Эх, так и вьётся, вьётся по ветру

Пройдёт зима, настанет лето
В саду деревья пышно расцветут
А мне бе-бе-бедному да мальчонке
Эх, цепями ручки-ножки закуют

Но я Сибири, Сибири не страшуся
Сибирь ведь тоже Русская земля
Эх, вейся, ве-ве-вейся, чубчик кучерявый
Эх, развевайся, чубчик, по ветру

- Alexander Malinin
- Willi Tokarev
- Viktor Korolev
- Pelageya and Garik Sukachov duo
- There are two different Hebrew lyrics for the tune. One, "עכו ארץ ישראל", "Acre, the Land of Israel" is of unknown authorship, another one, about Latrun is by Avraham Shlonsky. Acre and Latrun were replacing Siberia, because these were places of detention of members of Palmach, Haganah, and other anti-British activists.

== In culture ==
"Chubchik kucheryavy" is the title of the book about Leshchenko by Eduard Volodarsky. It was the base of the TV miniseries Pyotr Leschenko. Everything That Was....
