= Arbol =

Arbol or Árbol (Spanish: árbol, 'tree') may refer to:

- Árbol, Villalba, a parish in Vilalba, Spain
- Árbol, Antas de Ulla, a parish in Antas de Ulla, Spain
- Field of Arbol, a name for the Solar System in C. S. Lewis' Space Trilogy
- "Arbol", a 2019 song by Fede Vigevani

== See also ==
- Chile de árbol, a chili pepper
- Arboll, a place in Scotland
- Albor
- Abrol
- Arbor (disambiguation)
