= Chubchik =

Chubchik, Chupchick, Chupchik may refer to:

- Chubchik, a small chub (haircut)
- Chubchik (album) a 1996 solo studio album by Boris Grebenshchikov
- Chubchik (song), sometimes transliterated as "Chupchik", Russian criminal folk song
- Chupchick, a song from the 1997 album by Silence of the Balkans Goran Bregovic
- Chupchik, a colloquial term for the geresh sign in Hebrew writing, with several
- Chupchik, a Hebrew placeholder name for any small object or a small part of an object
