= Viktor Korolev =

Viktor Korolev may refer to:

- Viktor Korolev (mathematician)
- Viktor Korolev (musician)
