= Târgu Ocna Prison =

Prison in Romania

Coordinates: 46.2799°N 26.5945°E

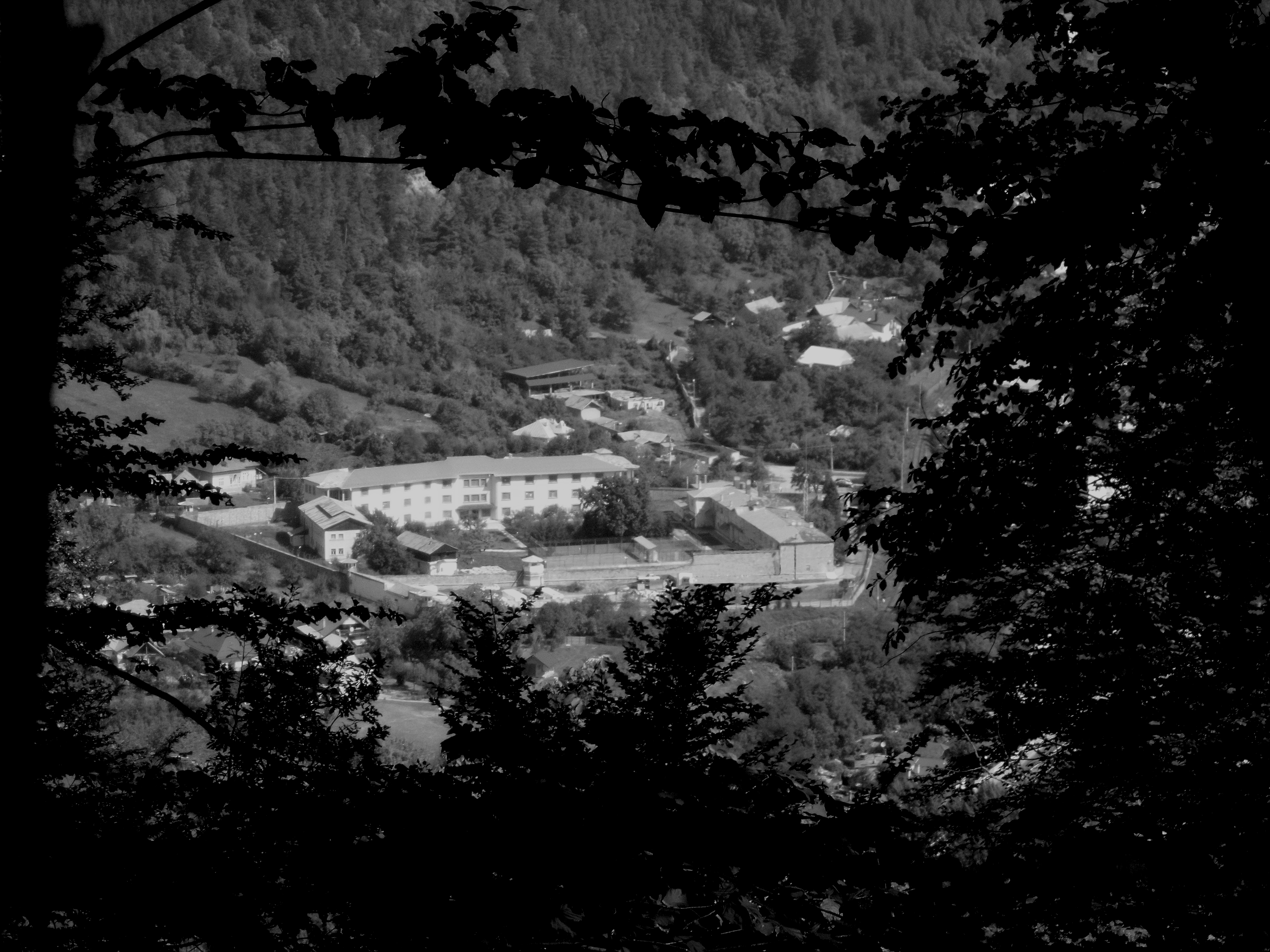
Târgu Ocna Prison

Târgu Ocna Prison is a prison located in Târgu Ocna, Bacău County, Romania.

== History ==
=== Early years ===
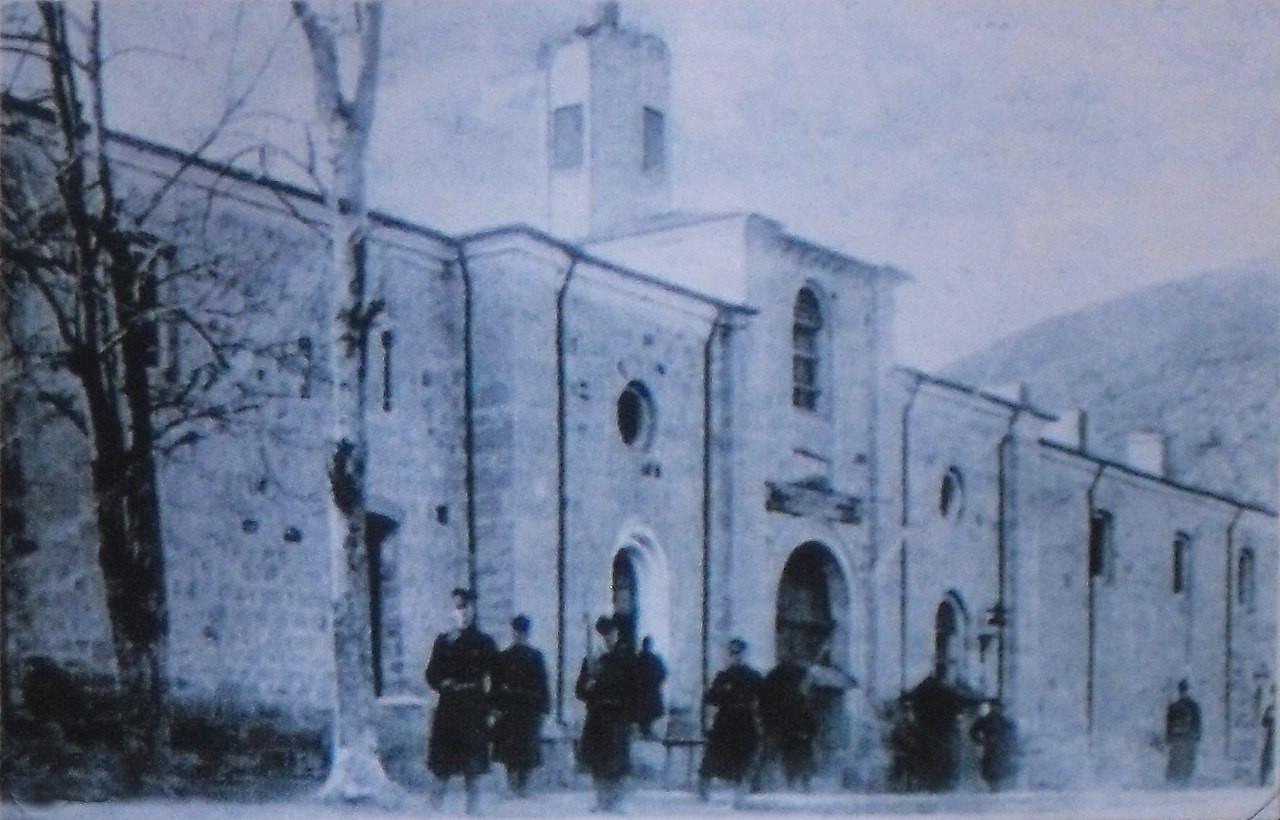
Târgu Ocna Prison in 1906

In 1851, when Prince Grigore Alexandru Ghica visited the area, he was impressed by the poor conditions in which detainees worked at the local salt mine, ordering the construction of a new penitentiary. Until completion in 1855, they were housed at his castle. The prison was horseshoe-shaped, with entry through the castle gate. There were twelve rooms, each fitting 25–30 men, for a total of around 350. The administration was on the ground floor, the deposits and chapel on the upper floor, the kitchen and bakery in the basement, staffed by prisoners. During the day, they were escorted to the salt mine, only returning to sleep. From 1851 to 1931, common criminals such as murderers and thieves were held at Târgu Ocna. From 1916 to 1919, during World War I, most detainees were deserters and draft resisters. Members of the banned Romanian Communist Party were brought there during the 1930s, including Chivu Stoica, Alexandru Drăghici, Gheorghe Apostol, Alexandru Moghioroș, Simion Bughici, and Marin Florea Ionescu. A safe house in town maintained links with the prisoners.

In 1931, tests revealed that most prisoners suffered from severe tuberculosis. At that point, forced labor stopped and the prison was used only for tuberculosis patients. Healthy prisoners were sent to Ocnele Mari and Aiud, while sick ones were brought in from other places. In 1936, construction of a new prison began. Designed as a tuberculosis sanatorium, benefiting from the atmospheric conditions of the area, it was on three levels. It was completed in 1939, when the old prison was demolished in stages, the stone used to build the perimeter.

=== Communist era ===
Under the communist regime, the 1939 building was used as a prison for tubercular inmates, while the castle was the administrative headquarters. It served as a psychiatric hospital from 1977 to 1997, when the prison hospital was revived. In the immediate aftermath of the 1944 coup, the communist prisoners were freed and a field hospital set up. After the end of hostilities, Târgu Ocna held "counter-revolutionaries" and common criminals of both sexes, as well as male minors from 1956 to 1997. The population at any given time varied between 350 and 550. The fact that prisoners suffered from a deadly communicable disease was a mixed blessing. On the one hand, medicines were in constant short supply, although families could send them, and medical care was largely supplied by incarcerated doctors. On the other hand, as recalled by Richard Wurmbrand, the guards never approached too close, leaving detainees largely to their own devices, and it was among the mildest communist prisons. Five escapes took place in 1946, with other attempts until 1955. Hunger strikes took place in 1946 when prisoners were kept beyond their sentence, and in 1955, when their windows were painted. Political prisoners rioted in the latter year when one of them was forcibly shaved.

For a year starting in May 1950, there was an abortive attempt at introducing "re-education" to Târgu Ocna. Around 40 tubercular "re-educators", veterans of Pitești Prison, were transferred there with direct orders from Eugen Țurcanu to continue the process. The warden approved only isolating prisoners, not torturing them; the first attempted beating prompted him to threaten them with transfer elsewhere. After administrative delays of some months, the efforts were revived in February 1951, again with orders not to apply beatings. The experiment came to an abrupt halt on May Day 1951. A detainee, seeing the torturers approach, broke the door glass and started shouting for help. Other prisoners started making noise, which was heard in the streets full of celebrating crowds. Investigations were carried out, and the episode was classified as a failure: the Securitate secret police were unable to replicate the conditions at Pitești, and the prison's position in the middle of town meant that torture victims’ screams could not be concealed. Inmates who died at Târgu Ocna Prison in the early 1950s include Valeriu Gafencu, Pyotr Leshchenko, and Constantin Tobescu.
