= Ciobalaccia =

- Commune and village
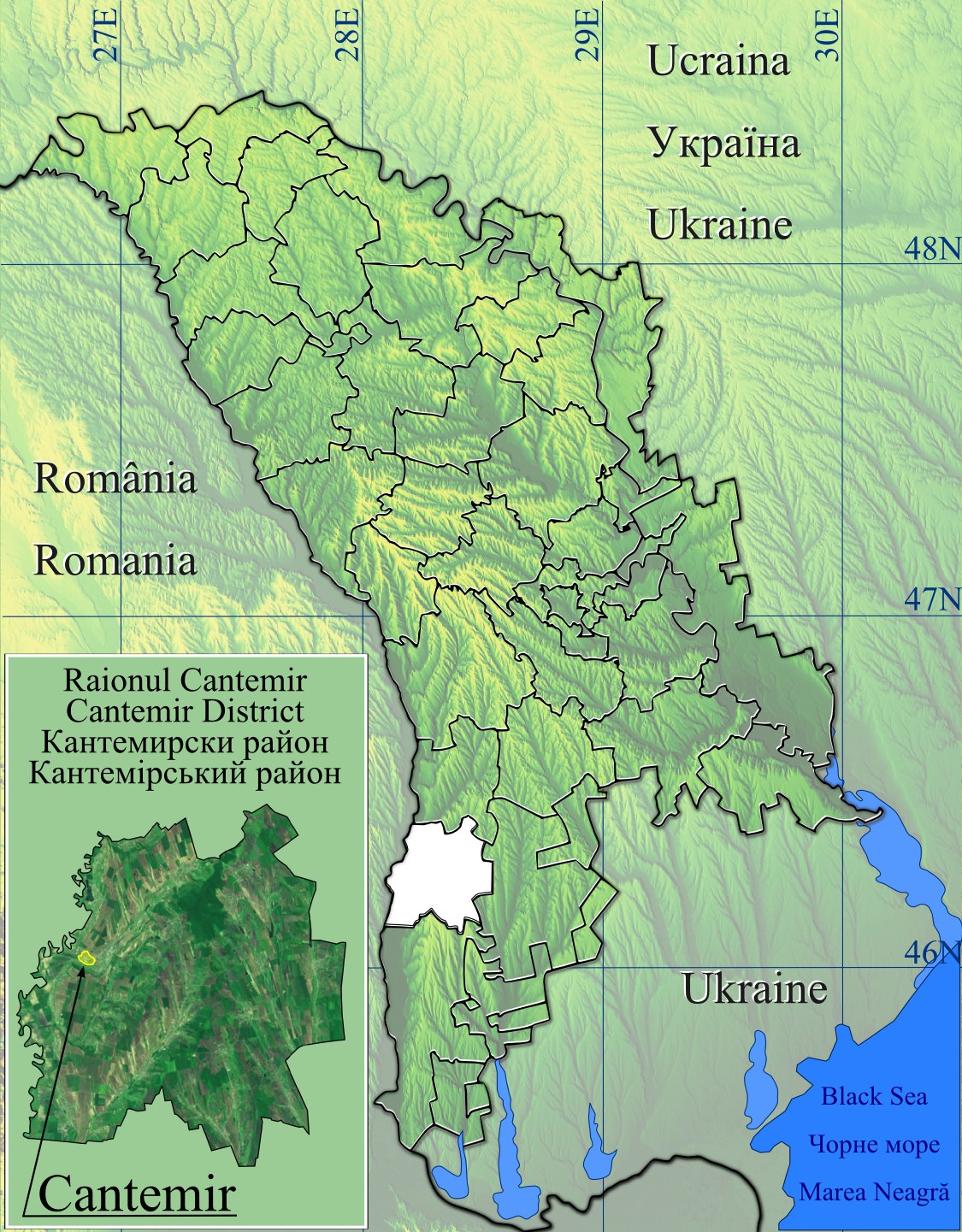
- Location in Moldova
- Coordinates: 46°10′N 28°17′E
- Country: Moldova
- District: Cantemir District

Population (2014)
  - Total: 3,017
- Time zone: UTC+2 (EET)
  - Summer (DST): UTC+3 (EEST)

Ciobalaccia is a commune in Cantemir District, Moldova. It is composed of three villages: Ciobalaccia, Flocoasa and Victorovca.

== Notable people ==
- Sergiu Mocanu
- Alexandr Petkov
