= Andrei Bolocan =

Moldovan television personality

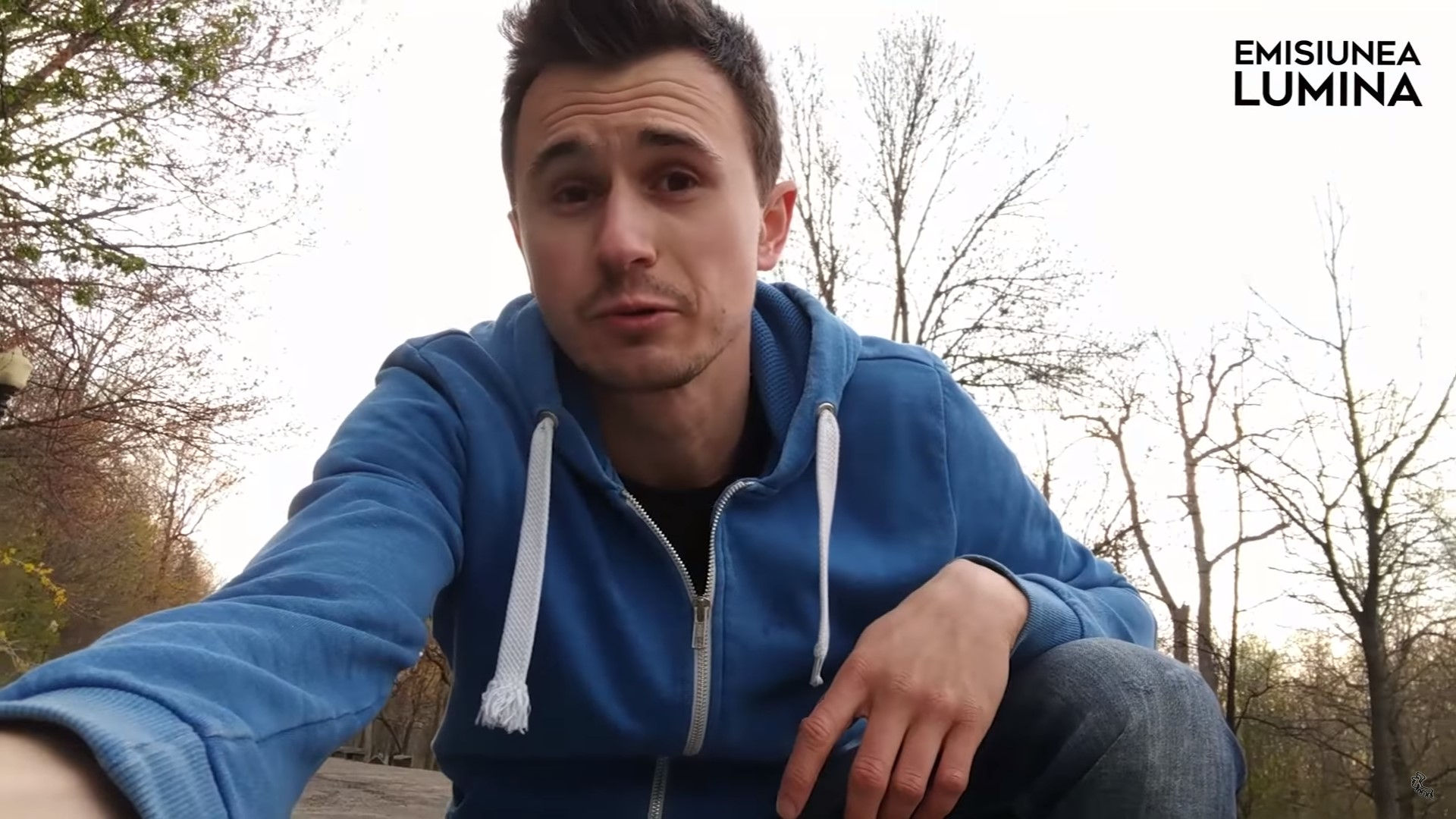
- Andrei Bolocan hosting "Lumina"
- Born: July 17, 1987 (age 38); Chișinău, Moldovan SSR
- Education: Academy of Economic Studies of Moldova (not graduated)
- Occupation(s): Television personality, stand-up comedian
- Years active: 2010-present

Andrei Bolocan (born July 17, 1987, Chișinău, USSR) is a Moldovan television personality and stand-up comedian.

== Biography ==
Bolocan graduated the Mircea Eliade Lyceum in his hometown, Chișinău. He then studied at the Academy of Economic Studies of Moldova, followed by a German university (where he followed a Philosophy degree), and finally a university in Romania – without graduating any.

He started his career in entertainment by briefly working at a radio station, then entered the television business when he joined Jurnal TV in 2010. Bolocan gained popularity as a co-host of "Sare și Piper" ("Salt & Pepper"), "Ministerul Adevărului" ("Ministry of Truth"), "Deșteptarea" ("Wake Up"), as well as other media projects.

Bolocan currently hosts and produces his own show "Lumina" ("The Light"). Initially streamed over the internet, the show was included in TV8's schedule in September 2017. Starting with 2018, he co-hosts a new show, "Internetu' Grăiește" ("Internet is Speaking"), on the same channel, together with his spouse, fellow TV personality Nata Albot.

== Personal life ==
Bolocan is married to Nata Albot. They have four children.
