= Tartaul =

- Village
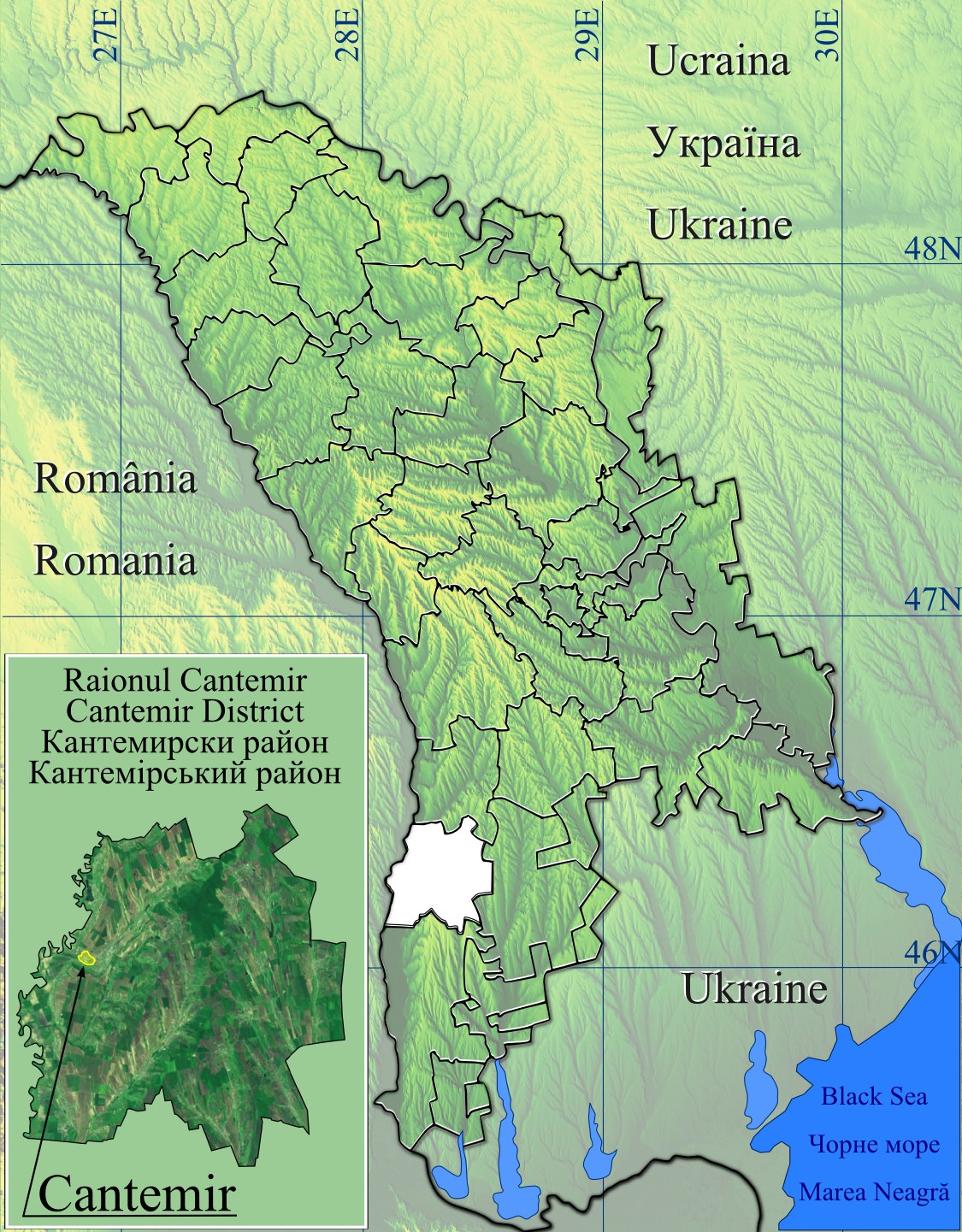
- Location within Cantemir
- Coordinates: 46°12′23″N 28°19′5″E
- Country: Moldova
- District: Cantemir District

Government
  - Mayor: Vasile Lupașco (PLDM)

Area
  - Total: 8.83 km^{2} (3.41 sq mi)
- Elevation: 68 m (223 ft)

Population (2014 census)
  - Total: 952
- Time zone: UTC+2 (EET)
  - Summer (DST): UTC+3 (EEST)
- Postal code: MD-7338
- Website: www.tartaul.md

Tartaul is a village in Cantemir District, Moldova.

== Notable people ==
- Rodica Ciorănică
