= Pyotr Leshchenko =

Ukrainian-Russian singer (1898–1954)

Pyotr Leshchenko Пётр Константинович Лещенко
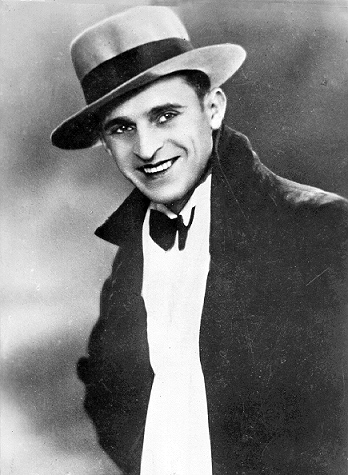
- Pyotr Leshchenko in the 1930s

Background information
- Born: Pyotr Konstantinovich Leshchenko; 2 June 1898; Isayevo, Kherson Governorate, Russian Empire
- Died: 16 July 1954 (aged 56) Târgu Ocna, Romania
- Occupation: Singer
- Years active: 1920s–1950s

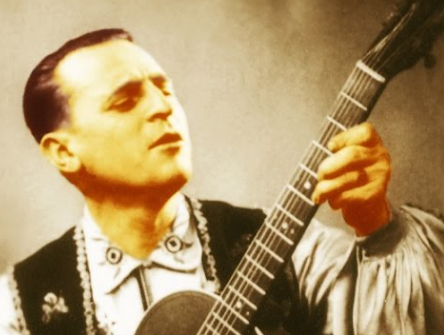
From an album cover, circa 1929.

Pyotr Konstantinovich Leshchenko (Ukrainian: Петро Константинович Лещенко; Russian: Пётр Константинович Лещенко; 2 June 1898 Isayevo, Odessa uezd, Kherson Governorate, Russian Empire (now Ukraine) – 16 July 1954 Bucharest), a singer in the Russian Empire, and later Romania, is universally considered "the King of Russian Tango" and specifically known for his rendition of "Serdtse"—a European tango, sung in Russian.

== Biography ==
He was born in the village of Isaieve, Kherson Governorate (now part of Odesa Oblast, Ukraine) to a poor and illiterate Ukrainian peasant mother and without a father. During the First World War, his mother and stepfather moved to Chișinău (Bessarabia Governorate), which was later united with Romania (today's Moldova).

He was proficient in numerous languages: Russian, Ukrainian, Romanian, German, and others. In his early childhood, he sang in a church choir and learned how to play the 7-string guitar.

He was drafted into the Russian army, and attended an officers' college in Kyiv. After graduating he was sent to the front, and was wounded soon thereafter, recuperating at a military hospital in Chișinău.

After the war, Pyotr, who had never learned a real trade, worked at various restaurants, serving, dish-washing and performing small theatrical acts. He had a soft baritone voice.

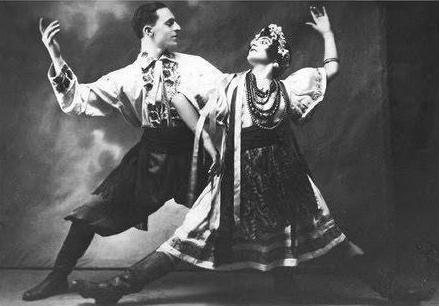
Pyotr Leshchenko and Zinaida Zakit performing a Ukrainian dance in 1929

After taking some ballet lessons in Paris, he started performing with his Latvian wife Zinaida Zakit, a dancer. Their act was a mixture of ballet, folklore dance and European tango, which was so popular it led to tours to Egypt, Syria, Lebanon, Turkey, Germany, and Great Britain. It was at Riga, when he improvised Romani style music and tango singing to make up for the absence of his pregnant wife, that he discovered he could sing in front of an audience.

In 1935, he was at the peak of his success. Though he still included old Russian romances, and even Soviet songs (like "Serdtse", which was originally sung by Leonid Utyosov) in his repertoire, songs were now composed for him exclusively (with the tango songs turning Argentine in style and arrangement). One of his favourite non-Russian composers was Jerzy Petersburski, but he also sang work composed by Pavel German, Konstantin Podrevsky, and Isaak Dunayevsky. Composers who composed certain songs specifically for him included Oscar Strok, Mark Maryanovsky, and Yefim Sklyarov. Many lyrics of Leshchenko songs were written by Boris Fomin.

Leshchenko performed for European nobles and "White" (anti-Bolshevik) Russian émigrés at his own "Leschenko" cabaret in Bucharest (dubbed the "Eastern Maxim's"). The first part of every performance would typically be dedicated to Romani style music, but during the second part Leshchenko would dress up in a tuxedo, with a white silk handkerchief and sing and dance Argentine tango.

In the Soviet Union his work was banned both because he was believed to be a "white émigré" (which he was not legally) and because the style (tango and foxtrot) was deemed counterrevolutionary. Nevertheless, secretly he was very popular: people would even listen to Radio Tehran to hear his music, 1978-records were smuggled into the country from the Baltics, and specialists would bootleg his music onto "ribs" (used X-ray plates).

When during the Second World War and the subsequent occupation of Odessa by the Romanian army, Leshchenko was finally able to perform in Ukraine, the country he still considered his own. People would queue for hours on end to buy a ticket to one of his Odessa concerts. It was at Odessa that Pyotr met his second wife, Vera Georgievna Belousova, for whom he would later, back in Romania, divorce Zinaida.

After Romania switched sides in August 1944 and the Soviet army entered Romania, Leshchenko was not arrested, and became the protégé of general Vladimir Burenin, military commander of the Red Army garrison in Bucharest. Some sources believe this was due to Marshal Georgy Zhukov being a secret admirer of his music – Pyotr probably thought so, and after the war, wrote many letters to friends in the Soviet Union asking them to contact high-level officials so that he and Vera might be allowed back to the country of their birth.

In 1951, a week after receiving an official letter granting them permission to settle in the Soviet Union, Vera and Pyotr were arrested by the Romanian police. Vera was extradited to the Soviet Union, where she was condemned to forced labour for amongst other things, "marrying a foreigner". Pyotr was detained in a prison near Bucharest, and then was sent to a forced labour camp at the Danube–Black Sea Canal. Both outlived Joseph Stalin, but Pyotr died in a prison hospital in Târgu Ocna on 16 July 1954, without Vera at his side (she had already been released but did not know her husband was still alive). Some friends present when he died claimed his last words were "Friends, I am happy, for I will return to my fatherland! I am going away, but I leave you my heart." Vera died on 18 December 2009 at the age of 86.

In 1988, his 90th birthday was marked by several articles in Soviet newspapers, and several radio shows were dedicated to him at the time.

== Notable songs ==
While most tango dancers around the world only know Serdtse, on special theme evenings and modern CDs, other songs sung by Pyotr Leshchenko may get a mention. They include: the Argentinian Tangos Anikusha, Barselona, Chornye Glaza, Davay Prostimsya, Golubye Glaza, Moyo Poslednee Tango (Strok), Ne Uhodi, Ostansya, Priznaysya Mne, Studentochka, Skazhite Pochemu, Skuchno, Ty I Eta Gitara (both sometimes called "Polish Tangos"), Vernulas Snova Ty, Vino Lyubvi (Maryankovsky), and Zabyt Tebya, the Romani Romances Chto Mne Gorye and Za Gitarnyi Perebor, and finally the "waltzes" Moy Drug and Pesnya o Kapitane (this last one, like Serdtse, with text written by the Soviet poet Vasily Lebedev-Kumach), and Russian criminal folk song "Chubchik".

== In popular culture ==
- In August 2012, Russian production company, Central Partnership, produced a television drama based on his biography, The series Pyotr Leschenko. Everything That Was... stars Konstantin Khabensky as Leshchenko.
