= Heart (1934 song) =

1934 song

Argentine tango dancing to Serdtse

"Serdtse" (Russian: Сердце; translated as "Heart") is in its version sung by Pyotr Leshchenko one of the most frequently performed European style tango.

== Title ==
Originally the song was referred to by its first line as Как много девушек хороших (Kak mnogo devushek khoroshikh, So many nice girls). It was written by Vasily Lebedev-Kumach for the 1934 Soviet film musical Jolly Fellows. The music was by Isaak Dunayevsky. The first singer of the song was Leonid Utyosov.

In 1935, Pyotr Leshchenko started to sing the song in Argentine tango fashion. Although music by Leshchenko was officially disliked in the Soviet Union, the version as sung by Leshchenko gradually became the norm. In the former Soviet Union, the song is still perceived as a traditional Russian romance, whereas elsewhere in the world, the song is seen exclusively as an Argentine tango song. This tango version was always known as Сердце (Serdtse), according to the popular convention of naming a song after its chorus. But the title change may also have come due to a mistake, since Serdtse was also the title of another song in the same musical.

In 1984, a collection of songs and poems by Vasily Lebedev-Kumach was published in Moscow. The text of this song was arranged in the Leshchenko fashion, but the title was quoted as Kak khorosho na svete zhit'! (How great it is to be alive!)

The Russian Romance version of the song has been translated in Polish as Jak wiele jest ładnych dziewczyn.

Later a native Lvivian, Yuri Hnatovsky, performed a Ukrainian version as a Dance cover-version of Yuriy Gnatkovski clip Heart featuring the Tango-club Street people.

== Russian lyrics ==
Russian

Как много девушек хороших
Как много ласковых имён
Но лишь одно из них тревожит
Унося покой и сон - когда влюблён

Любовь нечаянно нагрянет
Когда совсем её не ждёшь
И каждый вечер сразу станет
Удивительно хорош - и ты поёшь

Припев:
Сердце - тебе не хочется покоя
Сердце - как хорошо на свете жить
Сердце - как хорошо что ты такое
Спасибо сердце что ты умеешь так любить

Roman transliteration

Kak mnogo devushek khoroshikh
Kak mnogo laskovykh imyon
No lish' odno iz nikh trevozhit
Unosya pokoy i son - kogda vlyublyon

Lyubov nechayanno nagryanet
kogda sovsem eyo ne zhdyosh'
i kazhdyi vecher srazu stanet
Udivitel'no khorosh - i ty poyosh'

Chorus:
Serdtse - tebe ne khochetsya pokoya
Serdtse - kak khorosho na svete zhit'
Serdtse - kak khorosho chto ty takoe
Spasibo serdtse, chto ty umeesh' tak lyubit'
(the whole song is then repeated instrumentally only, except for the last two lines)

English translation

There're so many nice girls!
There're so many endearing names!
But only one of them bothers me,
keeping away my calm and sleep - when I am in love.

Love will visit you by accident
when you're least expecting it
and every evening immediately gets
wonderfully nice - and then you sing

Chorus:
Heart - there is no way to keep you calm
Heart - how great it is to be alive in this world
Heart - how great it is that you are like that
Thank you, heart, for being so good at the art of love

== Ukrainian lyrics ==
Ukrainian

Дівчат чарівних є немало
Ласкавих безліч є імен
Лише одне ім'я бентежить
Та надихає до пісень, вночі і день

Кохання в груди закрадеться
Не буде спокою і сну
Весь світ казковим раптом стане
Коли любов свою знайду і збережу

Серце, чому ти спокою не знаєш?
Серце - кохання полум'я на мить
Серце, усе казкове, як кохаєш
Я вдячний, серце, за те що вмієш так любить

Серце, чому ти спокою не знаєш?
Серце, як добре нам з тобою жить
Серце, усе казкове, як кохаєш
Я вдячний, серце, за те що вмієш так любить

Roman transliteration

Divchat charivnykh ye nemalo
Laskavykh bezlich ye imen
Lyshe odne odne imia bentezhyt
Ta nadykhaye do pisen, vnochi i den

Kokhannya v hrudy zakradetsya
Ne bude spokoyu i snu
Vse svit kazkovym raptom stane
Koly lyubov svoju znaidu i zberezhu

Sertse chomu ty spokoyu ne znayesh
Sertse - kokhannya polumia na myt
Sertse use kazkove, yak kokhayesh
Ya vdyachnyi sertse, za te shcho vmiyesh tak lyubyt

Sertse chomu ty spokoyu ne znayesh
Sertse, yak dobre nam z toboyu zhyt
Sertse use kazkove, yak kokhayesh
Ya vdyachnyi sertse, za te shcho vmiyesh tak lyubyt

English translation

The girls stunning are not few
There are uncountably many good names!
But only one of them upturns me,
and inspires to do songs at night and day

The love will sneak into your chest
You'll know no rest or neither sleep
Whole world suddenly becomes fantastic
After I find my love and keep

Heart, why don't you know a rest
Heart is a love of a fire in a moment
Heart, everything's fantastic when you love
I appreciate, my heart, that you are able so to love

Heart, why don't you know a rest
Heart, how good to live together in the world
Heart, everything's fantastic when you love
I appreciate, my heart, that you are able so to love

== Other versions ==
The original version was sometimes sung with a refrain after both A and B.

The Russian pop group Aquarium in its 1996 rendition replaced the second (instrumental) part with

(C)Ya Vam pishu, chego ty bole?

Chto ya mogu eshchyo skazat'?

Теper' ya znayu - v Vashey vole

Меnya prezren'em nakazat'

(D)No mimо teshchinogo doma

Ya vsyo zh bez shutok ne khozhu:

То "Тikhiy Don" v оknо zаsunu

То "Kаmа-Sutru" pоkаzhu.

(followed by a complete Serdtse refrain)

The first fragment is a fragment of the novel in verse "Eugene Onegin" by the Russian poet Alexander Pushkin. The second fragment (B) is humorous and translates as follows: "But I still don't go past my mother-in-law's house without joking - I'll stick The Silent Don in the window, then I'll show the Kama Sutra".

Note that Akvarium called the song "Serdtse/Kak mnogo devushek khoroshikh". In the same year, Sergey Penkin did the same.

Line 3 and 4 of A are sometimes, e.g. by Konstantin Sokolsky rendered as:

"no lish' odno menya trevozhit

otgonyaya noch' i son, kogda vlyublyon"

While the second change ("chasing away my nightly sleep") does not affect the meaning, dropping "of them" in the third line may actually mean that the singer is not troubled by a girl's name, but by something else.

The film Jolly Fellows was shown in Tel Aviv and the Israeli poet Nathan Alterman wrote new lyrics to be used in the musical "Tel Aviv Ha'Ktana", entitling the song "Rina". The new words are a sardonic dialogue between two lovers.

== Arguments ==
Apart from the argument about the title, and about the original text (some sources say the author of the lyrics had a longer text in mind), there is also a problem with the exact meaning of the word "nice" ("khoroshiy"). Some translate as "good, well-mannered" (not naughty - a humorous approach), others translate as "pretty".
