= Ovidiu Creangă =

- Born: February 14, 1921; Vărzărești, Kingdom of Romania
- Died: December 4, 2017 (aged 96); Toronto, Ontario
- Education: Politehnica University of Bucharest
- Spouse: Laura (d. 2000)
- Awards: Order of Work; Medal of Work

Ovidiu Creangă (February 14, 1921 – December 4, 2017) was a Romanian activist and author. He served as an official of the Ministry of Economy (Romania) and taught at the Politehnica University of Bucharest. He lived in Canada from 1982 until his death in late 2017.

== Biography ==
Ovidiu Creangă was born on February 14, 1921, in Vărzăreşti, present-day Moldova, but at the time part of the Kingdom of Romania. He attended high school in Bălți, where Eugen Coșeriu, Sergiu Grossu, Valeriu Gafencu, Vadim Pirogan, Valentin Mândâcanu were his classmates After the Soviet occupation of 1940, he fled from Bessarabia and in 1944 from Cernăuți, where he was attending university. He then graduated from the Politehnica University of Bucharest, where he later also taught. In the 1970s, Creangă was an official of the Romanian Ministry of Economy. In 1982, when he was 61, Ovidiu Creangă emigrated to Canada. He died in December 2017 at the age of 96.

== Awards ==
- Order of Work (Romanian: Ordinul Muncii), Romania
- Medal of Work (Romanian: Medalia Muncii), Romania
- "Magna Cum Laude" from the Bucharest Polytechnic

== Works ==
- Ovidiu Creangă, "Cu şi fără securişti", Preface Paul Goma, (Vicovia, Bacău, 2009)

== Notes ==
1. Present-day Moldova.
