= Allot (surname) =

Allot is a surname. Notable people with the surname include:

- Robert Allot (died 1635), London bookseller and publisher
- William Allot (16th century), English Roman Catholic priest
- John Allot (died 1591), 16th-century English merchant and politician
- Well Emmanuel Allot (1919–2012), birth name of François Brigneau
- William Dixon Allott (1817–1892)
