= Hymn of the Bolshevik Party =

Unofficial anthem of the Bolshevik Party

Gimn Pártii Bolshevikóv
English: Anthem of the Bolshevik Party
- Гимн партии большевиков
- Party anthem of the Bolshevik Party (1939–56); Party anthem of the Communists of Russia (2016–)
- Lyrics: Vasily Lebedev-Kumach, c. 1938
- Music: Alexander Alexandrov, c. 1938
- Adopted: 1939
- Readopted: 2016

Audio sample
- Anthem of the Bolshevik Party: file; help

The Anthem of the Bolshevik Party (Russian: Гимн партии большевиков, romanized: Gimn partii bolshevikov) is a Russian communist song composed by Alexander Alexandrov. Its lyrics are written by Vasily Lebedev-Kumach. The opening bars of the song are sampled from Life Has Become Better (Жить стало лучше), one of Alexandrov's previous pieces. From the 1930s to the 1950s, this served as the unofficial anthem of the All-Union Communist Party (Bolsheviks), later CPSU. In 2016, the Communists of Russia party declared this piece to be their anthem.

The same melody for the hymn with some minor alterations is used for the State Anthem of the Soviet Union and the State Anthem of the Russian Federation. The melody is also used ironically for the National Anthem of Libertaria, a popular right-libertarian song in the public domain.

== Lyrics ==
Russian original

Страны небывалой свободные дети,
Сегодня мы гордую песню поём
О партии самой могучей на свете,
О самом большом человеке своём.

Припев:
Славой овеяна, волею спаяна,
Крепни и здравствуй во веки веков!
Партия Ленина, партия Сталина,
Мудрая партия большевиков!

Cтрану Октября создала на земле ты,
Могучую Родину вольных людей.
Стоит как утёс государство Советов,
Рождённое силой и правдой твоей.

Припев

Изменников подлых гнилую породу
Ты грозно сметаешь с пути своего.
Ты гордость народа, ты мудрость народа,
Ты сердце народа и совесть его.

Припев

И Маркса и Энгельса пламенный гений
Предвидел коммуны грядущий восход.
Дорогу к свободе наметил нам Ленин,
И Сталин великий по ней нас ведёт.

Припев

Romanization of Russian

Strany nebyvaloy svobodnyye deti,
Segodnya my gorduyu pesnyu poyom
O partii samoy moguchey na svete,
O samom bol'shom cheloveke svoyom.

Pripev:
Slavoy oveyana, voleyu spayana,
Krepni i zdravstvuy vo veki vekov!
Partiya Lenina, partiya Stalina,
Mudraya partiya bol'shevikov!

Stranu Oktyabrya sozdala na zemle ty,
Moguchuyu Rodinu vol'nykh lyudey.
Stoit kak utyos gosudarstvo Sovetov,
Rozhdyonnoye siloy i pravdoy tvoyey.

Pripev

Izmennikov podlykh gniluyu porodu
Ty grozno smetayeshy s puti svoyego.
Ty gordosty naroda, ty mudrosty naroda,
Ty serdtse naroda i sovesty yego.

Pripev

I Marksa i Engel'sa plamennyy geniy
Predvidel kommuny gryadushchiy voskhod.
Dorogu k svobode nametil nam Lenin,
I Stalin velikiy po ney nas vedyot.

Pripev

English translation

Free children of an unprecedented country,
Today we sing our proud song
About the mightiest party in the world,
About our greatest man ever.

Chorus:
Surrounded by glory, soldered by will,
Grow stronger and live for eternity!
The party of Lenin, the party of Stalin,
The wise party of Bolsheviks!

You've created the country of October on Earth,
The mighty motherland of free people.
Our Soviet state stands like a rock,
Born off your power and verity.

Chorus

Rotten breeds of sneaky traitors
You fearsomely sweep away from your path.
You're the people's pride, you're the people's wisdom,
You're the heart and conscience of the people.

Chorus

The brilliant genius of Marx and Engels
Predicted the future rise of the commune.
Lenin outlined to us the road to freedom,
And Great Stalin is leading us through.

Chorus

== See also ==
- State Anthem of the Soviet Union
- Life has become better
- National anthem of Russia
