= Valeriu Gafencu =

Romanian paramilitary member (1921–1952)

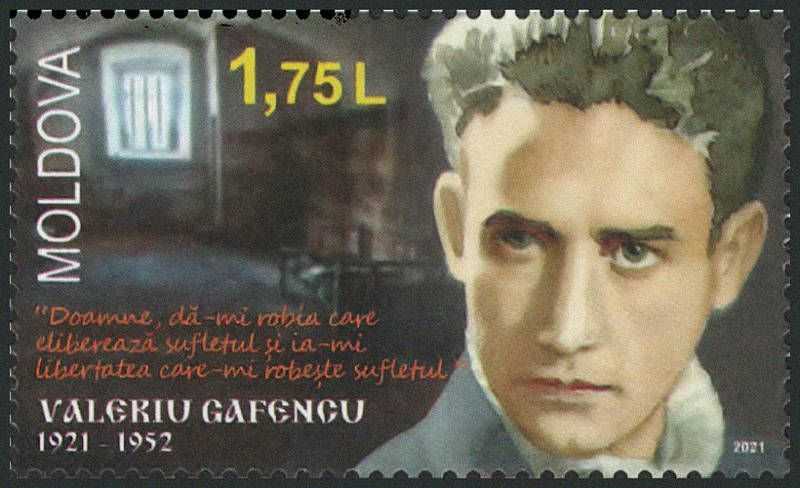
- Gafencu on a 2021 stamp of Moldova

Personal details
- Born: 24 January 1921 Sîngerei, Kingdom of Romania (now in Moldova)
- Died: 18 February 1952 (aged 31) Târgu Ocna, Romanian People's Republic
- Denomination: Romanian Orthodox Christian
- Parents: Vasile Gafencu (father)

Valeriu Gafencu (24 January 1921 – 18 February 1952) was a Romanian Legionary activist. After attempting to spread the Legionnaires' rebellion to Iași, he was arrested; he died at Târgu Ocna Prison 11 years later.

He was declared "Saint of the Prisons" by theologian Nicolae Steinhardt for his "exemplary Christian conduct and devotion to those in suffering", and has been widely commemorated by the Romanian Orthodox Church, which reportedly considered his canonization in 2013.

== Biography ==
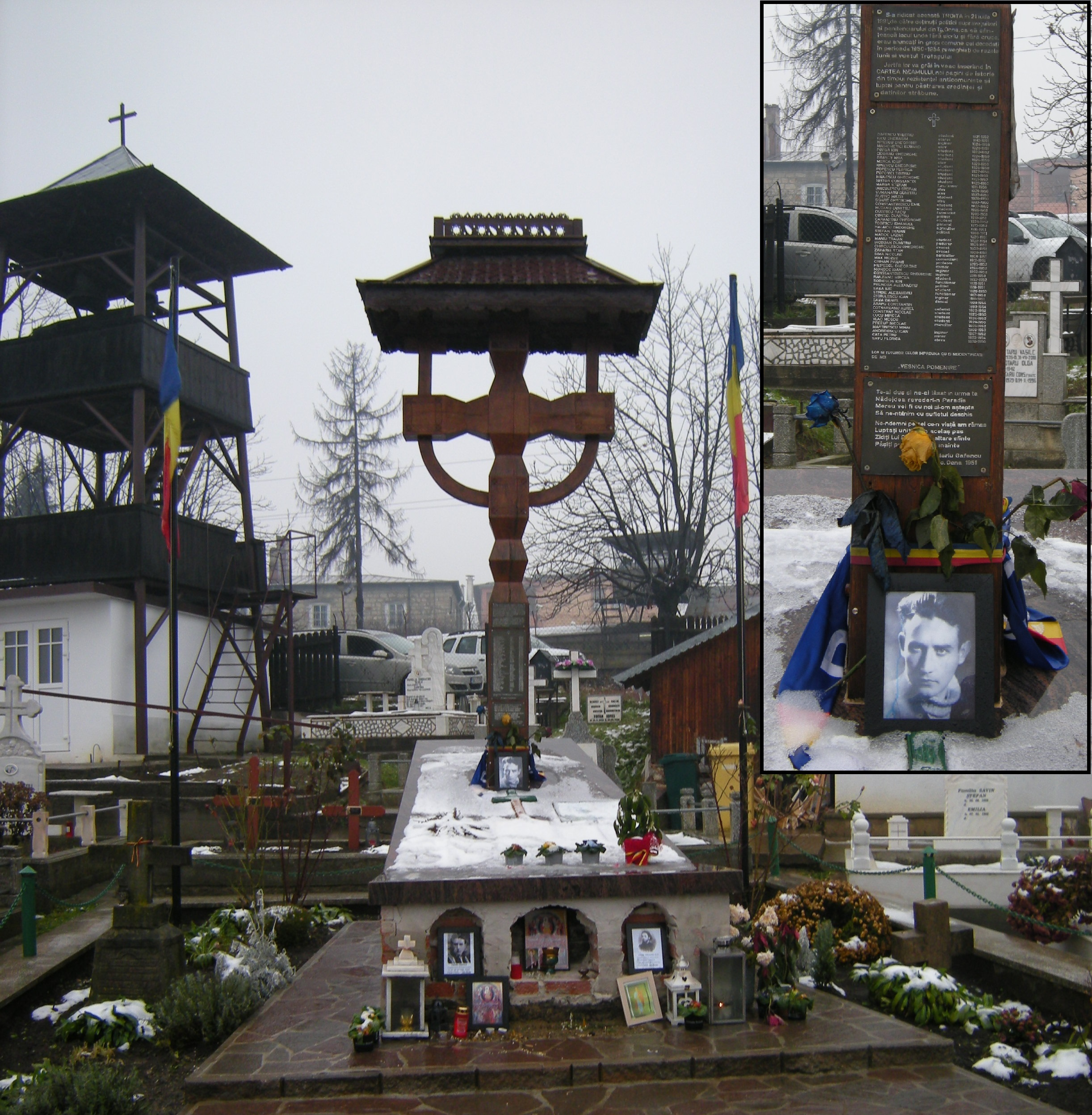
Cross erected in memory of detainees at Târgu Ocna Prison; Gafencu's photograph is at the base of the cross

Gafencu was born in 1921 in Sîngerei, at the time a city in Bessarabia, a region in the northeastern part of the Kingdom of Romania (now in the Republic of Moldova). His father, Vasile Gafencu, was a local nationalist politician, for which he was deported to Siberia upon the occupation of Bessarabia. He attended the Ion Creangă High School in Bălți, where Eugen Coșeriu, Sergiu Grossu, Vadim Pirogan, Ovidiu Creangă, and Valentin Mândâcanu were his classmates. As a high schooler, he became a sympathizer of the Legionary Movement and collected funds for it. Shortly after he graduated in 1940, the Soviet Union occupied Bessarabia and northern Bukovina; as a result, Gafencu and his family took refuge in Romania.

In Iași, Gafencu enrolled in the Faculty of Law. Upon the outbreak of the Legionnaire's Rebellion, Gafencu, armed with a pistol, visited two local high schools and attempted to incite support for the rebellion. After the crushing of the rebellion, Gafencu was arrested and sentenced to three months in prison; the sentence was soon extended to 25 years. In prison, Gafencu became an Orthodox "mystic" and studied theology. He was held in prisons at Aiud and Pitești. After contracting tuberculosis in 1950, he was moved to Târgu Ocna, where he died in 1952.

== Memory ==
Gafencu was remembered for his religiosity by fellow prisoners. Doxologia, the publishing house of the Archdiocese of Iași, characterizes his conduct in prison as "mystical", "ethereal", and "a light for those who resisted", and states that he disavowed ideology in favor of religion following his arrest. Gafencu's conduct resulted in him being declared one of the "Saints of the Prisons".

Gafencu was declared an honorary citizen of the town of Târgu Ocna in 2009, but the decision was rescinded in 2013 due to his participation in the Legionnaires' rebellion in January 1941. This rescission itself was overturned in 2015 by the Bacău County Court of Appeals, reinstating Gafencu as honorary citizen of Târgu Ocna. A book published in 2018 attests that Valeriu Gafencu was still an honorary citizen of Târgu Ocna as of that year.

In 2015, a bust of Gafencu was installed in the Alley of Ecclesiastical Personalities in Chișinău; it was cast in bronze by sculptor Veaceslav Jiglițchi and placed on a pedestal made of Cosăuți stone, crafted by folk master Veaceslav Lozan.

In 2021, a bust of Gafencu was inaugurated in front of the Palace of Culture of Sângerei, his hometown, by the Bishop of Bălți.

In 2025, Gafencu's visage, along with those of his fellow Legionnaires Ilie Lăcătușu and Radu Gyr, was painted onto the exterior of the newly erected Chapel of the Martyrs and Confessors of Communist Prisons in Bucharest. The mural was partially paid for by funds provided by the State Secretariat for Religious Affairs, which, when asked about the depiction of Legionnaires, disavowed the project.
