= Nata Albot =

Moldovan journalist

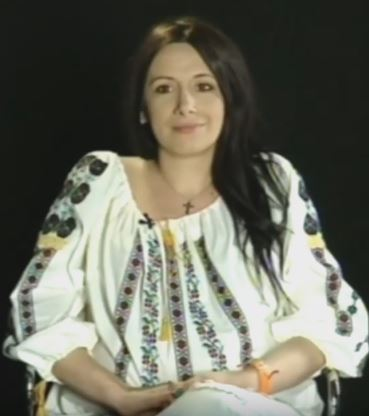
- Albot in 2016
- Born: 26 October 1979 (age 46); Chișinău, Moldavian SSR, Soviet Union
- Education: Moldova State University
- Occupation: Journalist
- Children: 4
- Website: nataalbot.md

Nata Albot (born 26 October 1979) is a blogger, TV producer, journalist and a media manager from Moldova. She has had several popular shows on radio and televisions in Moldova since she was 16 years old. She graduated from the Law School of Moldova State University. Nata Albot served as the general producer of Jurnal TV from March 2010 until July 2013. She also worked as the director of Radio Pro FM Chișinău, reporter for Pro TV, Director of TV reality talent show "Star Academy" at Prime TV. Also, as a freelancer, has produced the TV series "Aventura Americană" about Moldovan students summers spent with work and travel in the United States.

She forms a couple with Andrei Bolocan, a Moldovan TV presenter, and previously was married to R. Uskov, a lawyer. Albot has four children.

In 2013 she moved from Chișinău to Montreal.

== Awards ==
- On December 10, 2011, the United Nations awarded Nata Albot for a media campaign against intolerance towards children with physical disabilities.
- Woman of the Year 2010 in Moldova, VIP Magazin
