= Vărzărești =

- Commune
- Location in Moldova
- Coordinates: 47°07′N 28°12′E
- Country: Moldova
- District: Nisporeni District

Population (2014)
  - Total: 5,187
- Time zone: UTC+2 (EET)
  - Summer (DST): UTC+3 (EEST)

Vărzărești is a commune in Nisporeni District, Moldova. It is composed of two villages, Șendreni and Vărzărești.

== Notable people ==
- Ovidiu Creangă
- Valentina Ursu

== Gallery ==
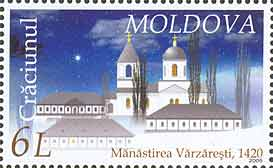
Vărzărești Monastery
