= Bălăurești =

- Village
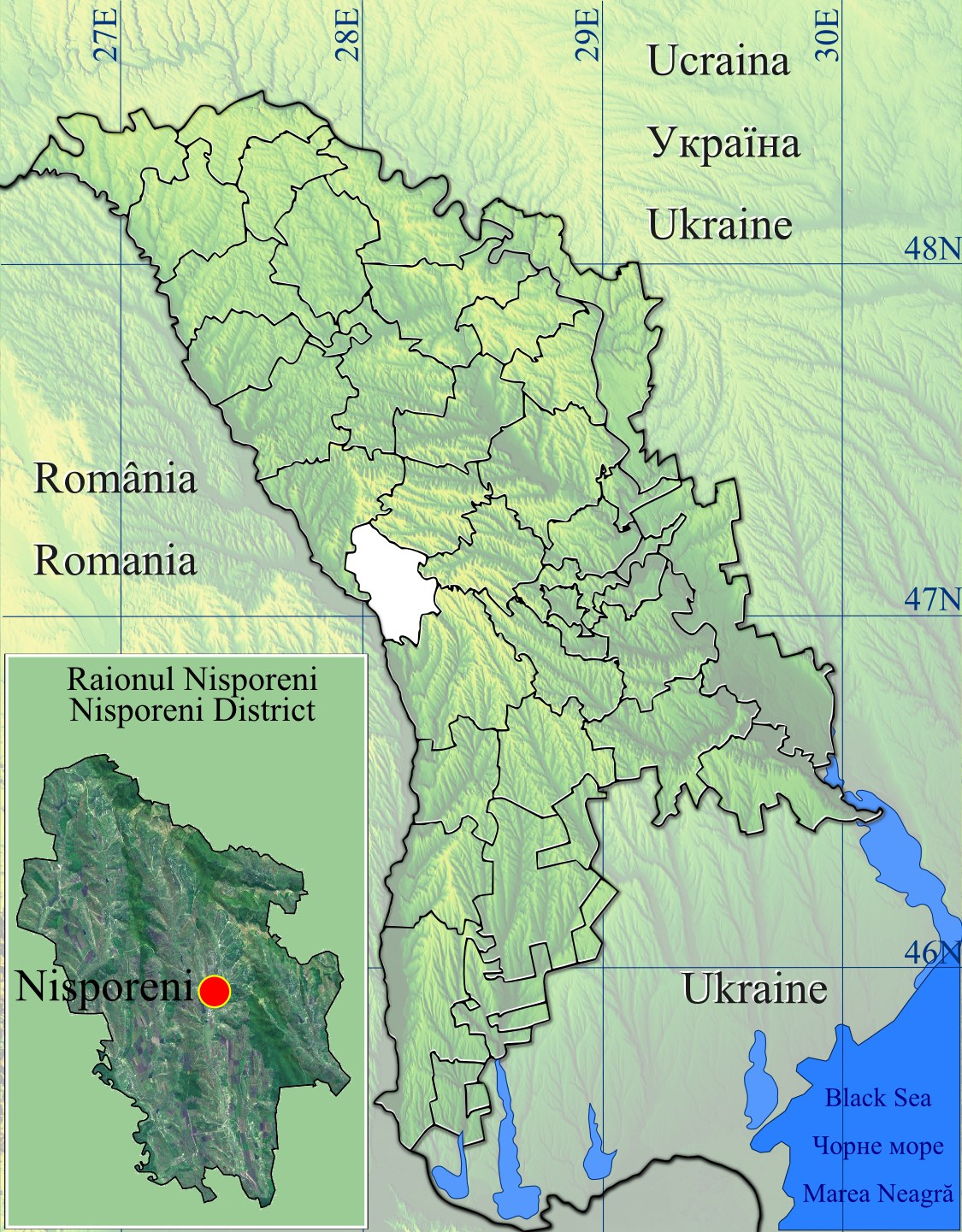
- Location within Nisporeni
- Coordinates: 46°56′24″N 28°8′13″E
- Country: Moldova

Government
  - Mayor: Alexandru Ion (PDM)
- Elevation: 111 m (364 ft)

Population (2014 census)
  - Total: 2,129
- Time zone: UTC+2 (EET)
  - Summer (DST): UTC+3 (EEST)
- Postal code: MD-6413

Bălăurești is a village in Nisporeni District, Moldova.
