= Yurko Hnatkovsky =

Ukrainian retro and jazz performer (born 1975)

Yuri Hnatkovsky Yurko Hnatkovsky
- Birth name: Юрій Гнатковський
- Born: 17 September 1975 (age 49)
- Origin: Lviv, Ukraine
- Genres: retro, psychedelic, waltz
- Years active: 2006–present
- Website: snizhnist.com

Yuri Hnathovsky (Ukrainian: Юрій Гнатковський; born 17 September 1975) is a Ukrainian retro and jazz performer. His first album Snizhnist was released in 2006, featuring Yulia Lord.

== Biography ==
Yuri Hnatkovsky was born in Lviv. He finished the Lviv's Politekhnika (Lviv Polytechnic) as a civil engineer.

In 2006, with the help of the concert band of Maria Zankovetska Theatre conducted a charity Christmas music show Snizhnist with intentions to reanimate the Lviv's jazz life, for which it was well known.

== Personal life ==
Hnatovsky has two sons: Bohdan and Lev-Daryi and a daughter, Emilia.

== Works ==
The samples are also available at the official website of Snizhnist.

- Tilky u Lvovi on YouTube
- Sertse on YouTube

== See also ==
- Serdtse
