= Ciutești =

- Commune
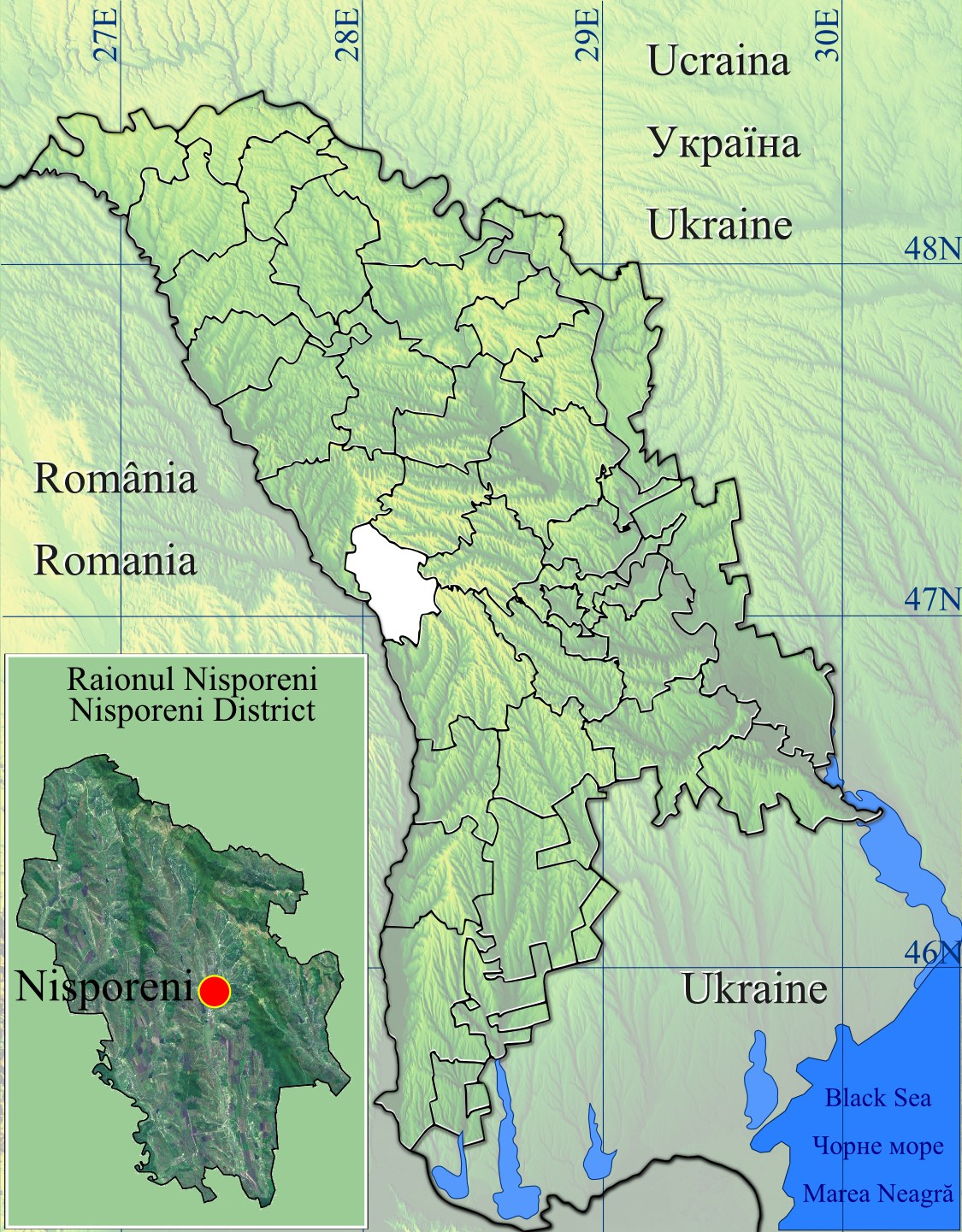
- Location within Nisporeni
- Coordinates: 47°10′39″N 28°7′34″E
- Country: Moldova
- Elevation: 178 m (584 ft)

Population (2014)
  - Total: 1,530
- Time zone: UTC+2 (EET)
  - Summer (DST): UTC+3 (EEST)
- Postal code: MD-6423

Ciutești is a commune in Nisporeni District, Moldova. It is an agricultural area. It is composed of two villages, Ciutești and Valea Nîrnovei.
