= Mihăiță Nițulescu =

Romanian boxer (c. 1969–2022)

- Born: c. 1969; Târgu Ocna, Romania
- Died: 6 July 2022 (aged 52–53). Bacău, Romania
- Nationality: Romanian

Mihăiță Nițulescu (c. 1969 – 7 July 2022) was a Romanian professional boxer in the 1980s and 1990s, best known for his bouts against Francisc Vaștag and Rudel Obreja, among others, at the National Championship Finals that were held at the Polyvalent Hall in Bucharest in 1989.

== Early life ==
Born to poor parents, Nițulescu was brought up in an orphanage in Târgu Ocna. From a young age, he was interested in sport, and through hard work and determination, he started training as a professional boxer, coached by boxing coach Mihai Pătrățeanu at CSM Borzești.

== Boxing career ==
Nițulescu's boxing career took off in 1989 when he reached the Romanian National Boxing Championship, which took place at the Polyvalent Hall in Bucharest in November. This gave him the opportunity to fight famous Romanian boxers such as Francisc Vaștag, Rudel Obreja, and many others.

== Death ==
Nițulescu died on 6 July 2022 from a stroke which allegedly was triggered by an assault on a street in Bacău by two men after he accidentally clipped the wing mirror of their van.
