= Vasile Gafencu =

Bessarabian politician (1886–1942)

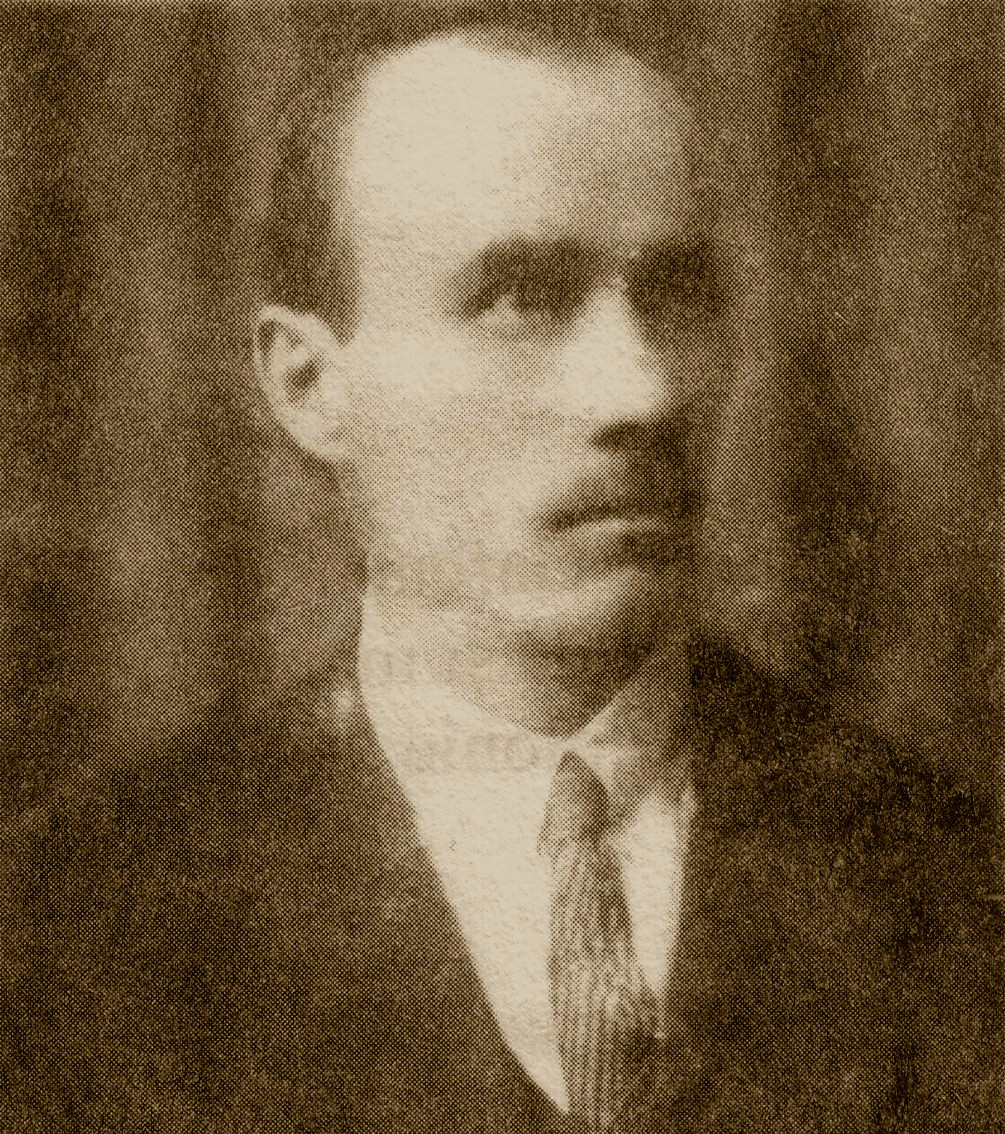

Member of the Moldovan Parliament
- In office 1917–1918

Personal details
- Born: 1 February 1886 Sîngerei
- Died: 16 March 1942 (aged 56) Arkhangelsk
- Party: National Moldavian Party
- Children: Valeriu, Valentina, Eleonora, and Elizabeta

Vasile Gafencu (1 February 1886 – 16 March 1942) was a Bessarabian politician.

He was the father of Valeriu Gafencu (1921–1952), nicknamed The Saint of Prisons.

== Biography ==
He served as Member of the Moldovan Parliament (1917–1918). After the Soviet occupation of Bessarabia and northern Bukovina in 1940, Gafencu was deported to Siberia by the Soviet authorities.

== Gallery ==
Moldovan stamp, 1998

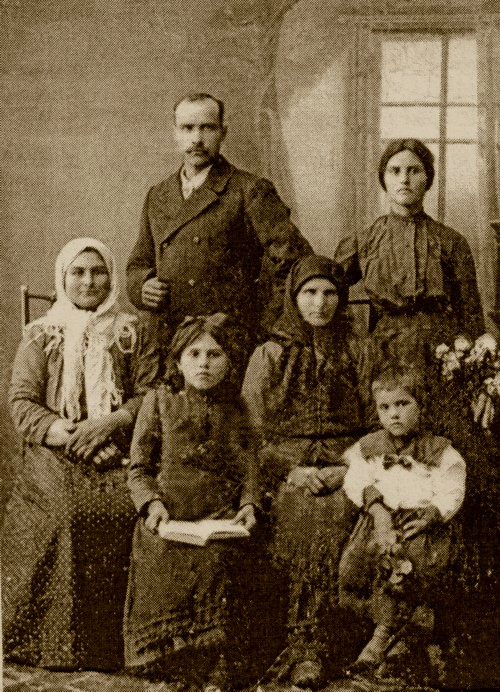
The standing man is Vasile Gafencu

== Bibliography ==
- Gheorghe E. Cojocaru, Sfatul Țării: itinerar, Civitas, Chişinău, 1998, ISBN 9975-936-20-2
- Mihai Taşcă, Sfatul Țării şi actualele autorităţi locale, "Timpul de dimineaţă", no. 114 (849), June 27, 2008 (page 16)
