= Albor =

Albor is a surname. Notable people with the surname include:

- Alejandro Albor (born 1964), American cyclist
- Xerardo Fernández Albor (1917–2018), Spanish physician and politician

== See also ==
- Albor Tholus, a Martian volcano
- Albot
