= Bălănești, Nisporeni =

Bălănești
- Commune
- Location in Moldova
- Coordinates: 47°12′N 28°12′E
- Country: Moldova
- District: Nisporeni District

Population (2014)
  - Total: 2,170
- Time zone: UTC+2 (EET)
  - Summer (DST): UTC+3 (EEST)

Bălănești is a commune in Nisporeni District, Moldova. It is composed of two villages, Bălănești and Găureni.

The highest point of Moldova, Bălănești Hill, is located in Bălănești.

Bălănești is the highest village in Moldova with an elevation of 436 m.
