= Pyotr Leschenko. Everything That Was... =

2013 Russian television mini-series

- Genre: Biopic; Musical
- Written by: Eduard Volodarsky
- Directed by: Vladimir Kott
- Starring: Konstantin Khabensky; Ivan Stebunov; Viktoriya Isakova
- No. of seasons: 1
- No. of episodes: 8

Production
- Producer: Denis Frolov
- Running time: 50–54 minutes
- Production company: Central Partnership

Original release
- Network: Inter; 1TV
- Release: 14 October 2013

Pyotr Leschenko. Everything That Was... (Russian: Пётр Лещенко. Всё, что было…, romanized: Pyotr Leschenko. Vse, chto bylo...) is a Russian biographical television mini-series, directed by Vladimir Kott, starring Konstantin Khabensky as Pyotr Leshchenko.

The show depicts the most significant events and milestones in the singer's life: childhood and youth, battles in the First World War, the beginning of his career, his success, touring Romanian-occupied Odessa, his women, and his tragic death in a prison in Romania in 1954.

The first episode of the series aired on Inter on 14 October 2013. From 22 until 25 May 2017, it was shown on 1TV.

== Cast ==
- Konstantin Khabensky as Pyotr Leshchenko
- Ivan Stebunov as Pyotr Leshchenko in his youth
- Andrey Merzlikin as Georgy Khrapak
- Miriam Sehon as Zhenya Zakitt, the first wife of Pyotr Leshchenko
- Viktoriya Isakova as Ekaterina Zavyalova
- Timofey Tribuntsev as Captain Sokolov
- Boris Kamorzin as Colonel Barankevich
- Aleksei Kravchenko as Sergey Nikanorovich Burenin, commandant of Bucharest
- Yevgenia Dobrovolskaya as Maria Burenina
- Sergey Byzgu as Daniil Zeltser, the impresario of Pyotr Leshchenko
- Yevgeny Sidikhin as Colonel of the Russian Imperial Army
- Dmitry Lipinsky as Andrei Kozhemyakin, Pyotr Leshchenko's childhood friend
- Nikolai Dobrynin as Konstantin, father of Pyotr Leshchenko
- Vera Panfilova as Zlata Zobar, a gypsy
- Mikhail Bogdasarov as Kostake, the owner of the restaurant
- Semyon Furman as Chorbe
- Elena Lotova as Vera Georgievna Belousova, second wife of Pyotr Leshchenko
- Olga Lerman as Katya Zavyalova in her youth
- Sergei Frolov as Georges Ypsilanti, head of Pyotr Leshchenko's orchestra
- Alexander Klukvin as Feodor Chaliapin
- Oleg Mazurov as Vasil Zobar, a Gypsy
- Aleksandr Adabashyan as Paul, the bartender
- Yevgeny Berezovsky as Zaletayev, the captain
- Yuri Anpilogov as Hauptmann
- Sergei Belyaev as Popescu, General
- Oksana Burlai-Piterova as mother of Pyotr Leshchenko
- Yevgeny Gerchakov as Antonescu
- Anton Fyodorov as German officer
- Denis Starkov as schoolboy
- Elena Muravyova as hotel attendant
- Fedor Rumyantsev as sound engineer of the Columbia studio
- Rasmi Djabrailov as Mikhai

== Production ==
Khabensky was chosen to play Pyotr Leshchenko, because the creators of the series said that he resembles the singer with his eyes, smile and an air of "nervousness". Leshchenko's widow, Vera Belousova, met Khabensky in the late 1990s and also noted at that time that the actor reminds her of Pyotr.

Konstantin Khabensky and Ivan Stebunov took singing classes to prepare for the shooting, and performed the songs themselves in the film.

Filming took place in Moscow, Moscow Oblast, Yaroslavl, as well as in Lviv and Odessa.
