= Nisporeni District =

Coordinates: 47°05′N 28°10′E

Nisporeni
- District (Raion)
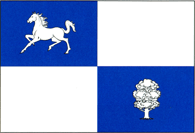
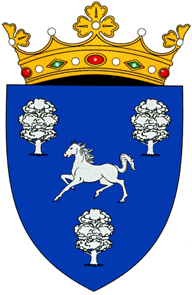
- Flag Coat of arms

- Country: Republic of Moldova
- Administrative center (Oraş-reşedinţă): Nisporeni
- Established: 2002

Government
  - Raion President: Ion Diavor (Party of Action and Solidarity, 2023)

Area
  - Total: 629.0 km^{2} (242.9 sq mi)
  - Water: 15.8 km^{2} (6.1 sq mi) 2.50%
- Elevation: 430 m (1,410 ft)

Population (2024)
  - Total: 36,413
  - Density: 57.89/km^{2} (149.9/sq mi)
- Time zone: UTC+2 (EET)
  - Summer (DST): UTC+3 (EEST)
- Area code: +373 64
- Car plates: NS
- Website: www.nisporeni.md

Nisporeni (Romanian pronunciation: [nispoˈrenʲ]) is a district (Romanian: raion) in west-central Moldova, with its administrative center at Nisporeni. According to the 2024 Moldovan census, its population was 36,413.

== History ==
The Vărzărești monastery was first mentioned on 25 April 1420. The oldest locations in the district (Bălăurești, Ciutești, Seliște, Nisporeni and Vărzărești) were first mentioned in 1420–1425. The 15th to 18th centuries were marked by economic (trade and agriculture) and cultural development (the construction of monasteries and churches) and population growth. The city of Nisporeni was first mentioned by Gaspar Graziani in his book dated 4 January 1618. According to Graziani, at that time Nisporeni was ruled by Farima Nicolae II, descendant of the Farima dynasty and cousin of Michael the Brave. Nicolae II is one of Moldova's national heroes. Local people were primarily involved in farming (grapes and other fruit) and hunting. In 1812, after the Russo-Turkish War (1806-1812), the Russian Empire occupied Basarabia; during the period 1812–1917, there was an intense russification of the native population. In 1918, after the collapse of the Russian Empire, Bessarabia united with Romania; during this period (1918–1940, 1941–1944), Nisporeni District was part of Chisinau County. After the 1940 Molotov–Ribbentrop Treaty, Basarabia was occupied by the USSR. In 1991, as a result of the independence of Moldova, Nisporeni District became part of Ungheni County (1991–2003); in 2003, it became a separate administrative unit.

== Geography ==
Nisporeni District is located in the central part of the Republic of Moldova. It is bordered by Ungheni District on the northwest, Calarasi District on the northeast, Straseni District on the east, Hincesti District on the south, and Romania on the Prut River. The district is in the Cantral Moldavian Plateau. The hilly landscape is fragmented by valleys 150 to 250 metres (490 to 820 ft) deep, with steep ravines which develop landslides. Nisporeni District is situated on the highest part of the plateau, encompassing the Codri forest. The terrain has been called "Basarabian Switzerland." Paradoxically, the forested Codri is most prone to erosion and landslides. In the western part of the Codri is the highest point in Moldova, Bălănești Hill, at a height of 430 metres (1,410 ft).

=== Climate ===
Nisporeni District, in common with the republic, has a temperate continental climate with mild, short winters and warm, long summers. On average, there are 2,195 hours of sunshine in central Moldova. Sunshine ranges from 43 to 65 hours in December to 300–340 hours in July. The average annual temperature is 10 °C (50 °F). Monthly temperatures are above the annual average from March to November and below from December to February. Average annual precipitation ranges from 500–650 millimetres (20–26 in). Fall rains are highly variable.

=== Fauna ===
Fauna is typical of that found in European forests and includes fox, deer, red deer, spotted deer, badger, wild boar, raccoon dog, wolf and wildcats. Birds include hawk, owl, cuckoo, eagle and stork.

=== Flora ===
Forests occupy 34 percent of the district and include oak, beech, hornbeam, English oak, linden, maple and locust. Wildflowers include clover, knotweed, nettle, bellflower and fescue.

=== Rivers ===
The Prut, which crosses the district in the west, borders Romania; its principal tributaries are the Nîrnova and the Lăpușna. The Cogâlnic River, which flows into the Black Sea, rises in the district. There are also 45 ponds, with a total area of 1,580 hectares (6.1 sq mi).

== Administrative subdivisions ==
- Localities: 39
- Administrative center: Nisporeni
- City: Nisporeni
- Villages: 16
- Communes: 22

== Demographics ==
As of the 2024 Census, the district population was 36,413, of which 25.1% was urban and 74.9% was rural.

=== Ethnic groups ===
Ethnic group	% of total
Moldovans *	89.4
Romanians *	8.6
Romani	1.3
Ukrainians	0.3
Russians	0.2
Other	0.1
Undeclared	0.1

Footnote: * There is an ongoing controversy regarding the ethnic identification of Moldovans and Romanians.

=== Religion ===
- Christians - 99.4%
  - Orthodox Christians - 98.6%
  - Protestant - 0.8%
- Other - 0.1%
- No religion - 0.2%
- Not Declared - 0.3%

== Economy ==
The district has a total of 21,956 registered businesses. Agricultural land comprises 38,779 hectares (149.73 sq mi), 61.5 percent of total land area. Land in production makes up 21,736 hectares (83.92 sq mi) (34.5 percent of total land area) as follows:

- Orchards: 3,943 hectares (15.22 sq mi) (6.3 percent)
- Vineyards: 6,118 hectares (23.62 sq mi) (9.7 percent)
- Pasture: 6,838 hectares (26.40 sq mi) (10.8 percent)

Principal crops include grapes, cereals (wheat and oats), orchards (peach, apple and plum), sunflowers and rapeseed.

== Education ==
There are 36 educational institutions in the district with a total student population of 9,300 (including 350 graduate-level students). The total number of teachers is 731, with 144 at the graduate level.

== Politics ==
Centre-right political parties, particularly the AEI, are popular in the district; conversely, the PCRM has the lowest popularity of any Moldovan district. During the last three elections, the AEI vote increased by 74.5 percent.

Parliament election results
Year	AEI	PCRM
2010	21,193 (75.20%)	5,352 (18.99%)
July 2009	19,674 (69.73%)	7,670 (27.18%)
April 2009	12,143 (47.16%)	9,587 (36.16%)

=== Elections ===
Summary of 28 November 2010 Parliament of Moldova election results, Nisporeni District
Party	Votes	%	+/−
Liberal Democratic Party of Moldova	10,489	37.22	+14.46
Party of Communists of the Republic of Moldova	5,352	18.99	−8.19
Democratic Party of Moldova	5,292	18.78	+11.90
Liberal Party	4,220	14.97	−12.04
Party Alliance Our Moldova	1,192	4.23	−8.94
European Action Movement	702	2.49	+2.49
Other parties	942	3.32	+0.23
Total (turnout 60.63%)	28,386	100.00	

== Culture ==
In the district are two museums, 112 art museums, 13 musical ensembles, 34 public libraries and 30 cultural centers.

== Health ==
The district has a 200-bed general hospital. There are thirteen family-medicine offices, nine health centers and eight clinics. Nisporeni District has 73 doctors, 267 nurses and 240 auxiliary health-care workers.
