= VIP Magazin =

Magazine from Chișinău, Moldova

- Editor: Sergiu Gavriliță
- Frequency: Monthly
- Publisher: Rodica Ciorănică
- First issue: 2004
- Company: VIP Magazin Grup
- Language: Romanian
- Website: www.vipmagazin.md
- ISSN: 1857-0534

VIP Magazin is a magazine from Chișinău, Moldova, that was established in 2004. The magazine is published monthly and also has an online version available. The magazine had a show with the same name on Pro TV Chișinău, which ran from 2007 until it ended in 2010.
