= William Allot =

William Allot was a Catholic student of the University of Cambridge. He retired to Leuven on the accession of Elizabeth (1558), was ordained priest there, but soon returned to England. He was highly esteemed by Mary, Queen of Scots, whom he frequently visited in her prison, suffered imprisonment for his faith, and was banished.

Allot was from Lincolnshire.

At Mary's request he was made a canon of St. Quentin in Picardy (France). He died about 1590, and left a work entitled Thesaurus Bibliorum, omnem utriusque vitae antidotum secundum utriusque Instrumenti veritatem et historiam succincte complectens, with which is printed an Index rerum memorabilium in epistolis et evangeliis per anni circulum (Antwerp, 1577).
