= Sergiu Mocanu =

Moldovan politician (born 1961)

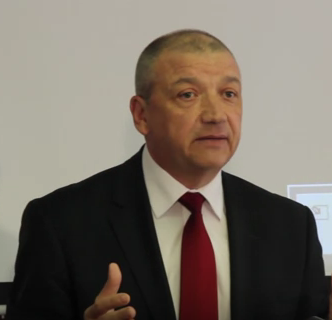
- Mocanu in 2015

President of the Republic of Unification Party

Special Missions Advisor to the President
- In office 6 February 2004 – 29 June 2007
- President: Vladimir Voronin
- Preceded by: Gheorghe Cîrlan
- Succeeded by: Valeriu Balaban

Member of the Moldovan Parliament
- In office 21 April 1998 – 20 March 2001
- Parliamentary group: Democratic Convention
- In office 29 March 1994 – 18 March 1997
- Succeeded by: Marin Beleuță
- Parliamentary group: Christian Democratic People's Front

Personal details
- Born: 6 June 1961 (age 64) Ciobalaccia, Moldavian SSR, Soviet Union
- Citizenship: Moldova; Romania
- Party: Popular Movement Anti-Mafia Party
- Other political affiliations: Christian-Democratic People's Party; The Party of Rebirth and Reconciliation of Moldova
- Spouse: Nadejda Mocanu
- Children: 2

Sergiu Mocanu (born 6 June 1961) is a Moldovan politician who served as member of Parliament of Moldova for two terms (1994–1997; 1998–2001) and held the position of Presidential Advisor with special missions for President Vladimir Voronin from 2004 to 2007. He has been leader of Popular Movement Anti-Mafia Party of Moldova since 2011.

== Biography ==
Sergiu Mocanu held the position of member of the Parliament of the Republic of Moldova from 1994 to 2001, member of the Christian Democratic Popular Front and editor of the newspaper "Ţara" from 1994 to 1998. He was also member of the Party of Rebirth and Reconciliation of Moldova from 1998 to 2003 and of the Liberal Party (Moldova).

He was a special guest (15 May 1994 – 25 September 1995) and representative (25 September 1995 – 23 June 1997) at the Parliamentary Assembly of the Council of Europe.

Sergiu Mocanu served as adviser of the president of Moldova Vladimir Voronin from February 2, 2004 to June 26, 2007. Since 2011, he holds the position of president of the Popular Movement Anti-Mafia Party of Republic of Moldova.

== Awards ==
- Order „Ştefan cel Mare”, 1992 (highest military distinction in Moldova)
