= Bălănești Hill =

Highest point in Moldova

- Dealul Bălănești
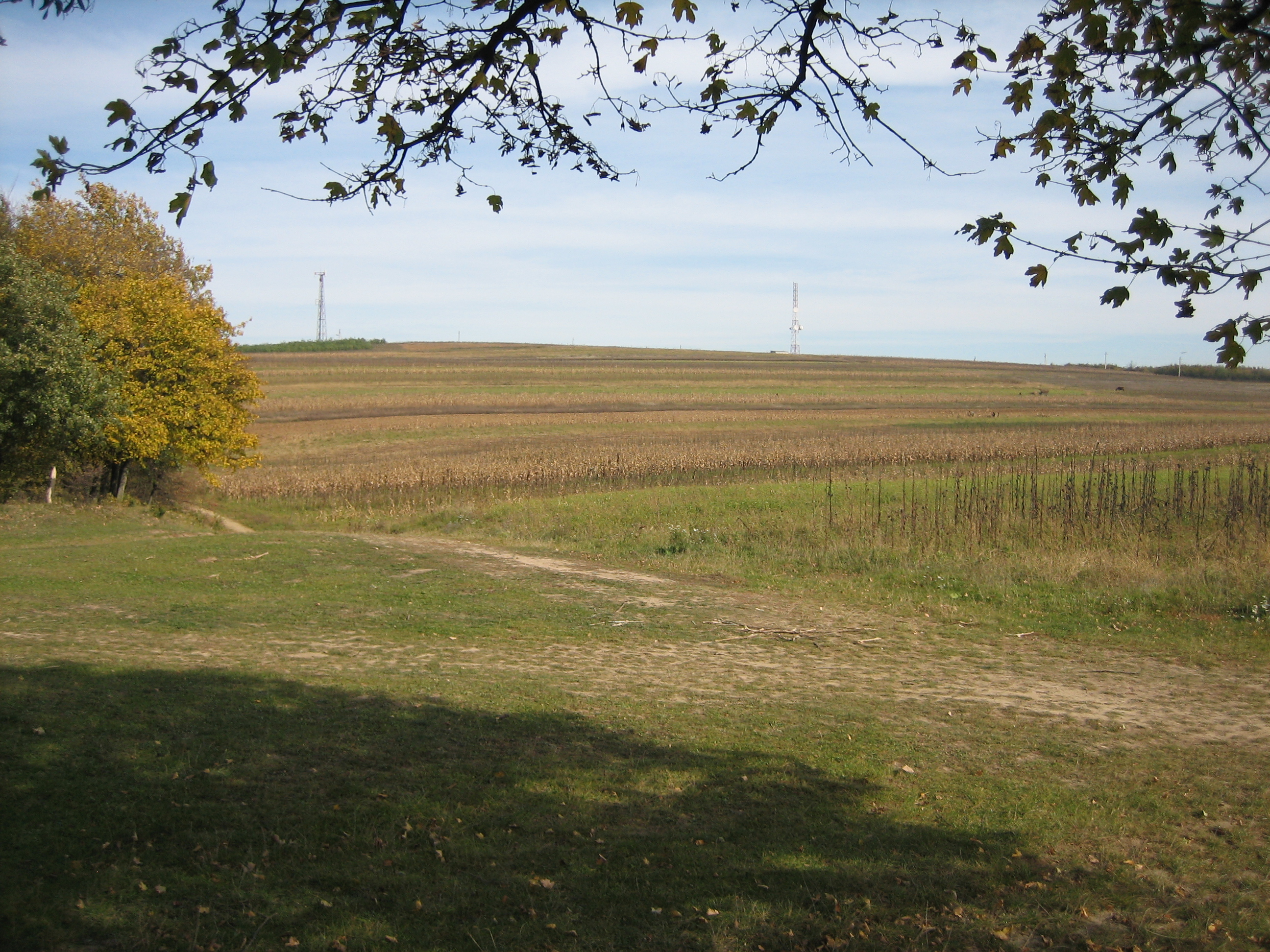

Highest point
- Elevation: 430 m (1,410 ft)
- Listing: Country high point
- Coordinates: 47°13′02″N 28°04′59″E

Geography
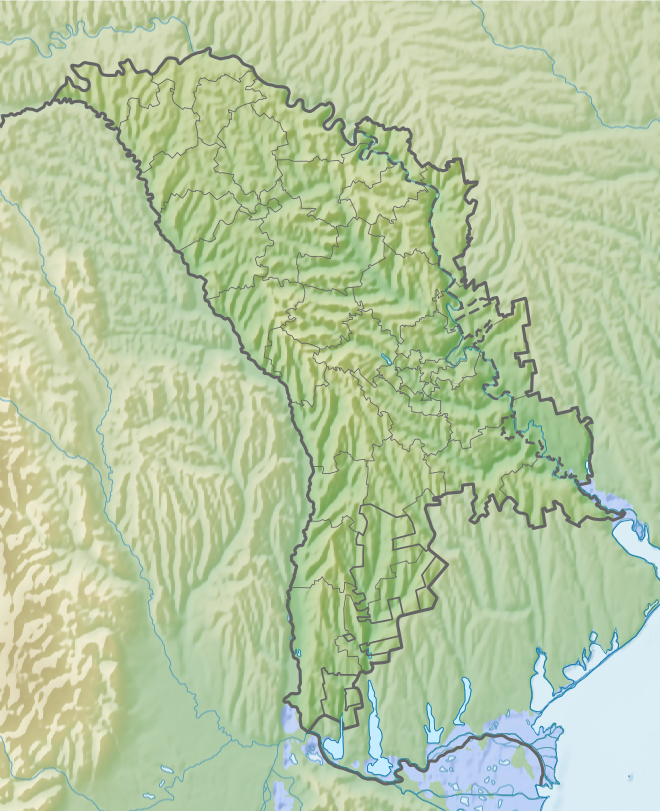
- Location within Moldova
- Location: Moldova

Bălănești Hill (Romanian: Dealul Bălănești, pronunciation: [bələˈneʃtʲ]) is the highest geographical point in Moldova, with an altitude of 430 metres (1,410 ft) (429 metres; 1,407 ft according to some sources). It is located in Bălănești and belongs to the Cornești Hills.

== Gallery ==
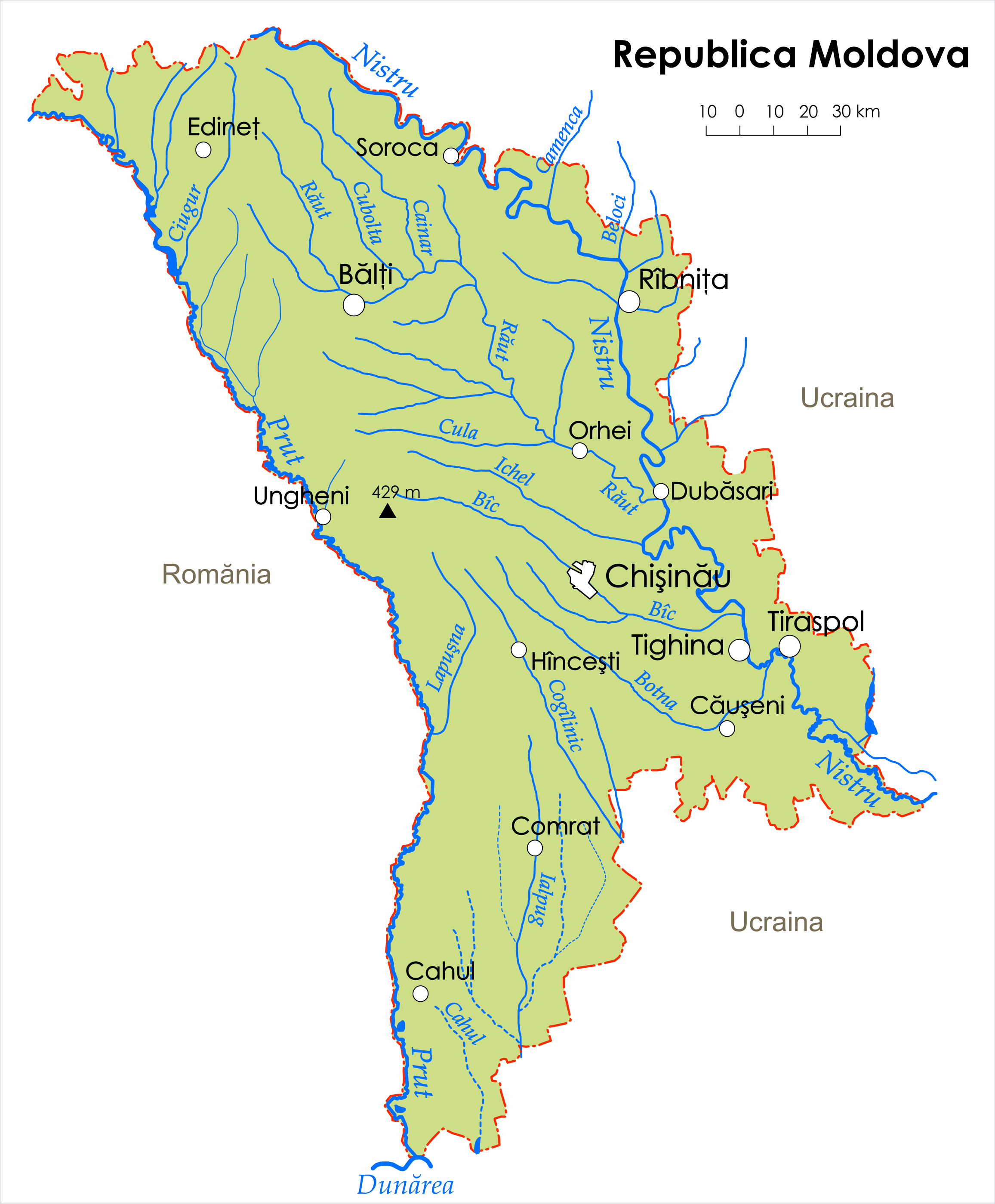
Moldova and Bălănești Hill, 429 metres (1,407 ft)

== See also ==
- Extreme points of Moldova
