= Viktor Korolev (musician) =

Viktor Korolev Ви́ктор Ива́нович Королёв
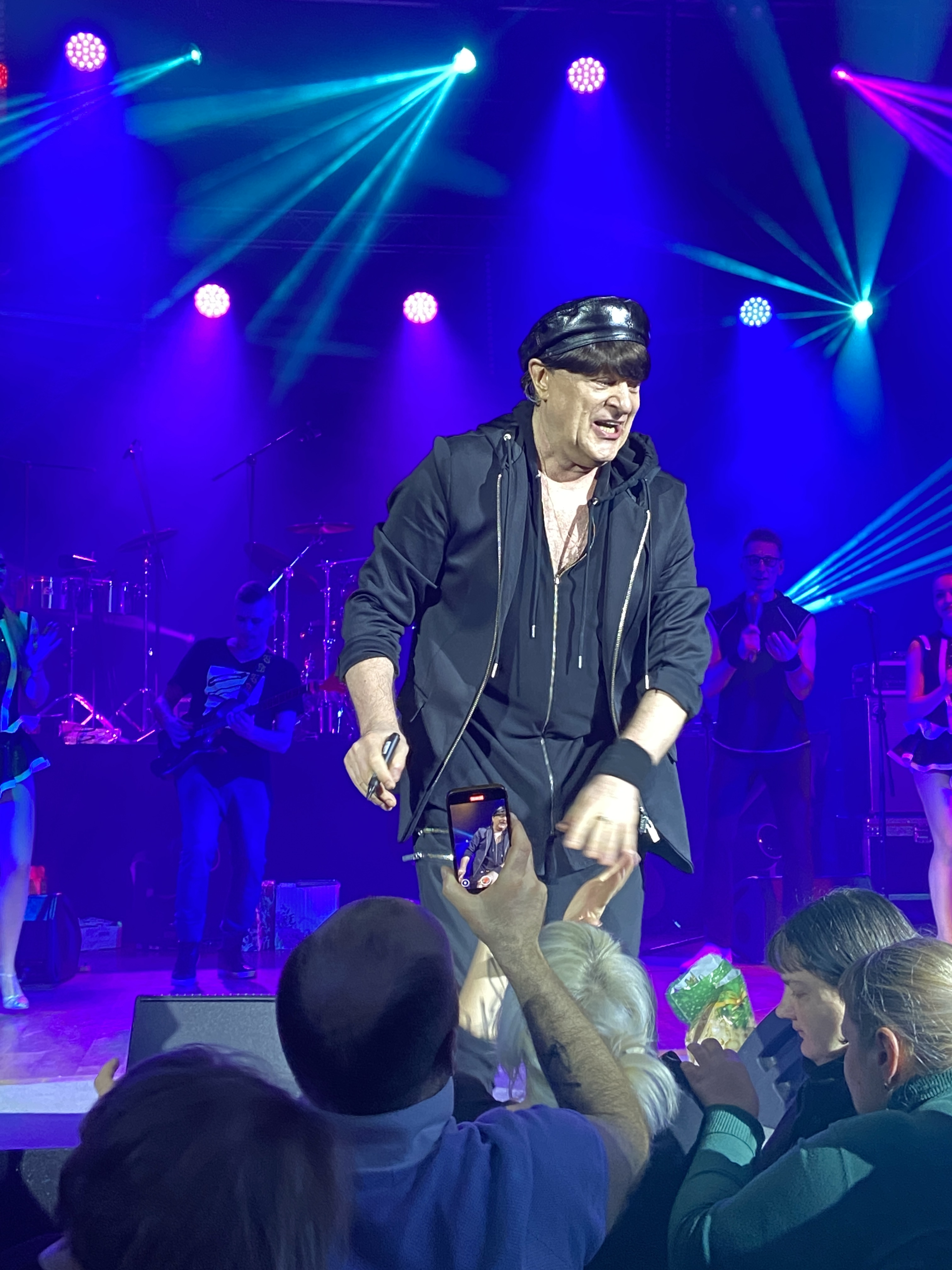

Background information
- Born: Tayshet, Irkutsk Oblast, U.S.S.R.
- Genres: Russian chanson, pop, Russian rock
- Occupations: Singer, songwriter, actor
- Instruments: Singing, piano
- Years active: 1992–present
- Website: viktor-korolev.ru youtube.com/MrKorolevViktor

Viktor Ivanovich Korolev (Note: In this name that follows East Slavic naming customs, the patronymic is Ivanovich and the family name is Korolev.) (born July 26, 1961) is a Russian singer and songwriter specializing in the Russian chanson music genre.

He won the Chanson of the Year award in both 2011 and 2019.

In 1992, he was awarded a diploma at the Golden Stag International Pop Song Festival in Brașov, Romania.

== Early life ==
Korolev was born in Tayshet, USSR on July 26, 1961. His mother, Alexandra Vasilievna, was a teacher in Siberia, and his father worked at the construction site of the Abakan-Taishet Railway. Korolev attended public school from 1968 to 1976.

From 1977 to 1981, Victor studied at the S. I. Taneyev Musical Institute of Kaluga majoring in piano. In 1981, he tried to attend theater school but did not succeed. By 1982, Korolev had been drafted to the Soviet Army, where he was stationed in Belarus as a private in missile forces, where he considered himself "fortunate" to participate in the military orchestra. According to Korolev, army musicians in the orchestra had special privileges including time off and the ability to see films in theater. Korolev has described the army musician life as a type of "army bohemia".

In 1984, he was accepted to Mikhail Shchepkin Higher Theatre School in Moscow, from which he graduated in 1988. After graduating, he worked with theatrical director Yuri Sherling and was featured in films, mostly prominently in 1990 Soviet-Italian-Spanish-Moroccan film The Battle of the Three Kings as well as 1993's Силуэт в окне напротив (lit. 'Silhouette in the opposite window') and 1993's Играем "Зомби", или Жизнь после битв (lit. 'Playing "Zombies": or, Life After the Battles').

He began recording albums from 1992 onwards.

The comedic claymation music video for Korolev's song "Базар-Вокзал" (lit. 'Bazaar Station') was released in 1997, which Korolev referred to as the first animated music video in Russia.

== Discography ==
- 1992 — «Бродвей на Тверской» (LP)
- 1994 — «Бродвей на Тверской» (CD)
- 1995 — «Наливай!»<
- 1997 — «Базар-вокзал»
- 1998 — «Любовь окаянная»
- 1998 — «Пьяная вишня»
- 1999 — «А я бухой»
- 2000 — «За любовь»
- 2002 — «Белая сирень»
- 2003 — «Укушу»
- 2004 — «Ля-ля-тополя»
- 2004 — «Московский озорной гуляка!» (DVD)
- 2005 — «Здравствуйте, гости!»
- 2006 — «Лимончики»
- 2006 — «Чёрным вороном»
- 2007 — «Шумел камыш»
- 2008 — «Горячий поцелуй»
- 2010 — «За твою красивую улыбку»
- 2011 — «Хрустальный замок»
- 2012 — «Я брошу жизнь к твоим ногам…»
- 2013 — «SMS»
- 2014 — «Я буду скучать…» (CD, DVD, LP)
- 2016 — «55!»
- 2018 — «На сердце белыми нитями»
