= Vasily Lebedev-Kumach =

Soviet poet and lyricist (1898–1949)

- Василий Лебедев-Кумач
- Born: 5 August 1898; Moscow, Russia
- Died: 20 February 1949 (aged 50); Moscow, Soviet Union
- Education: Moscow State University
- Occupations: Poet and Lyricist
- Writing career
- Pen name: (Vasily) Kumach

Vasily Ivanovich Lebedev-Kumach (Russian: Василий Иванович Лебедев-Кумач); 5 August [O.S. 24 July] 1898 — 20 February 1949) was a Soviet poet and lyricist.

== Biography ==
Vasily was born on 5 August 1898, to a shoemaker. He went on to work in the printing department of the Revolutionary Military Council, moving on to Russian Telegraph Agency (ROSTO). He attended Moscow State University. He adopted the nickname Kumach, a Turkish name for a variety of red cloth used to symbolise revolution. In time the nickname was added to his surname, as Lebedev-Kumach.

Vasily's satirical verses published in such papers as Rabochaya gazeta, Krest’ianskaia gazeta, Gudok, and Krokodil led to his growing popularity.

He was also one of the first persons to use the term blat (блат) in print, when Krokodil published the poem Blat-not.

Vasily also wrote numerous songs, the most famous being probably Священная война (Svyaschennaya Voyna, 'The Sacred War'), Песня о Родине (A Song About the Motherland), Гимн партии большевиков (Hymn of the Bolshevik Party), and Как много девушек хороших (Such a lot of nice girls!), later immortalised as the Argentine Tango song Serdtse (Сердце-Heart) by Pyotr Leshchenko. He also wrote songs for the film Late for a Date (1936).

He worked closely with the composer Isaak Dunayevsky. Composer Lyubov Streicher used Lebedev-Kumach‘s text for her song "A Simple Soviet Man", which was recorded commercially by pianist Maria Yudina in 1937.
