= Târgu Ocna =

- Town
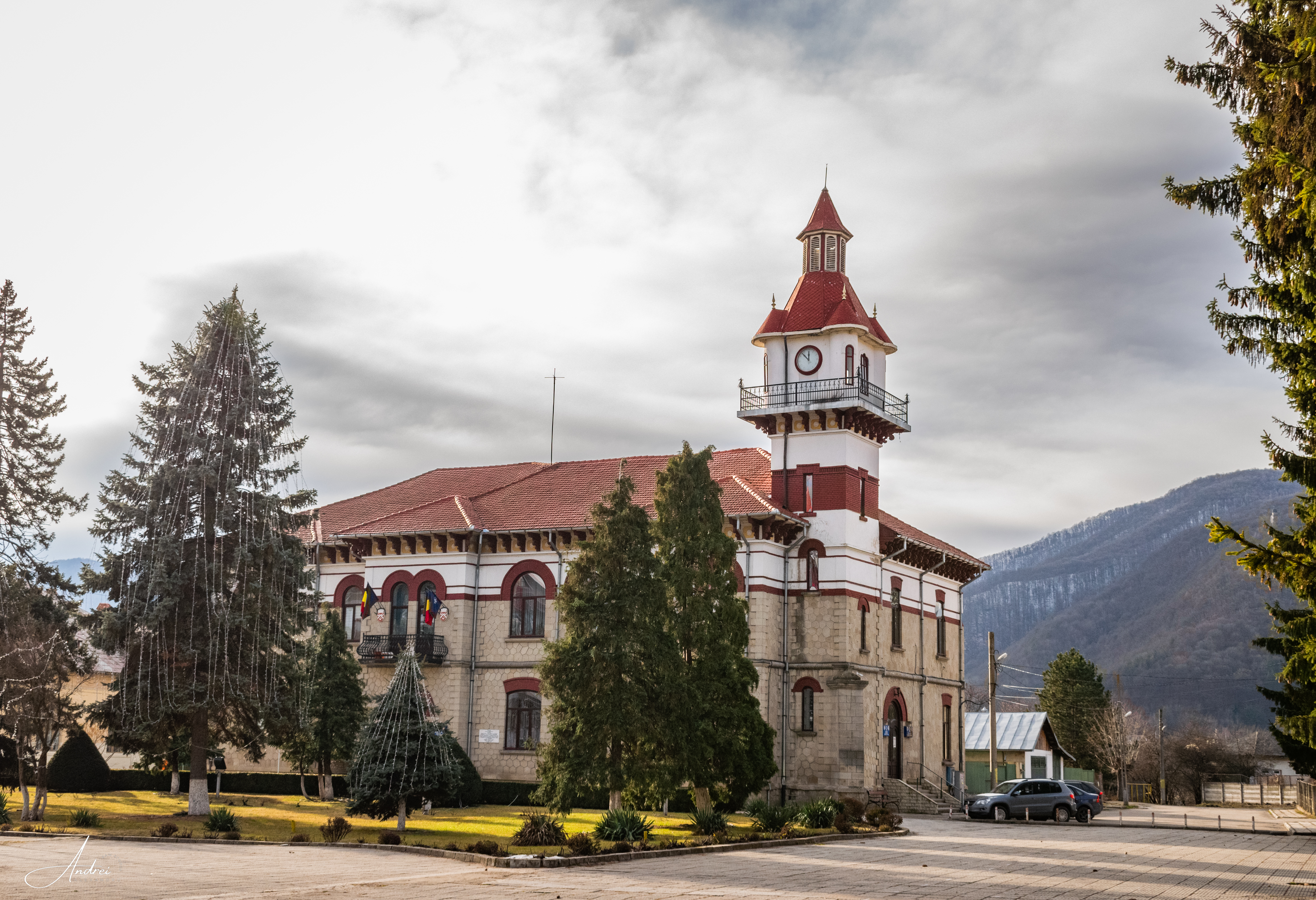
- Târgu Ocna town hall

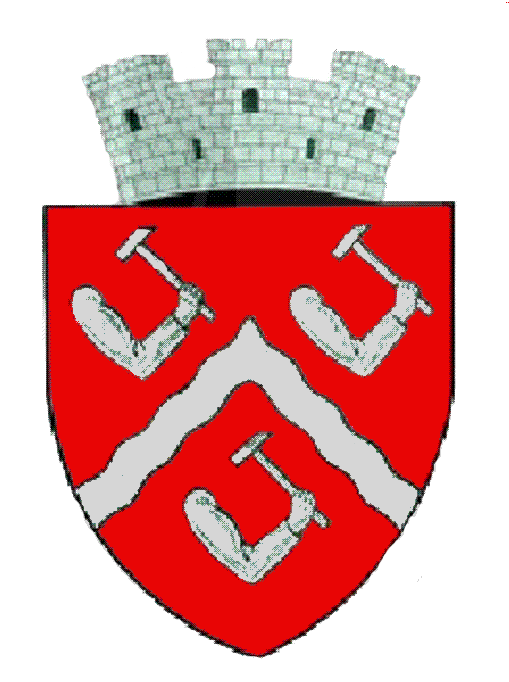
- Coat of arms

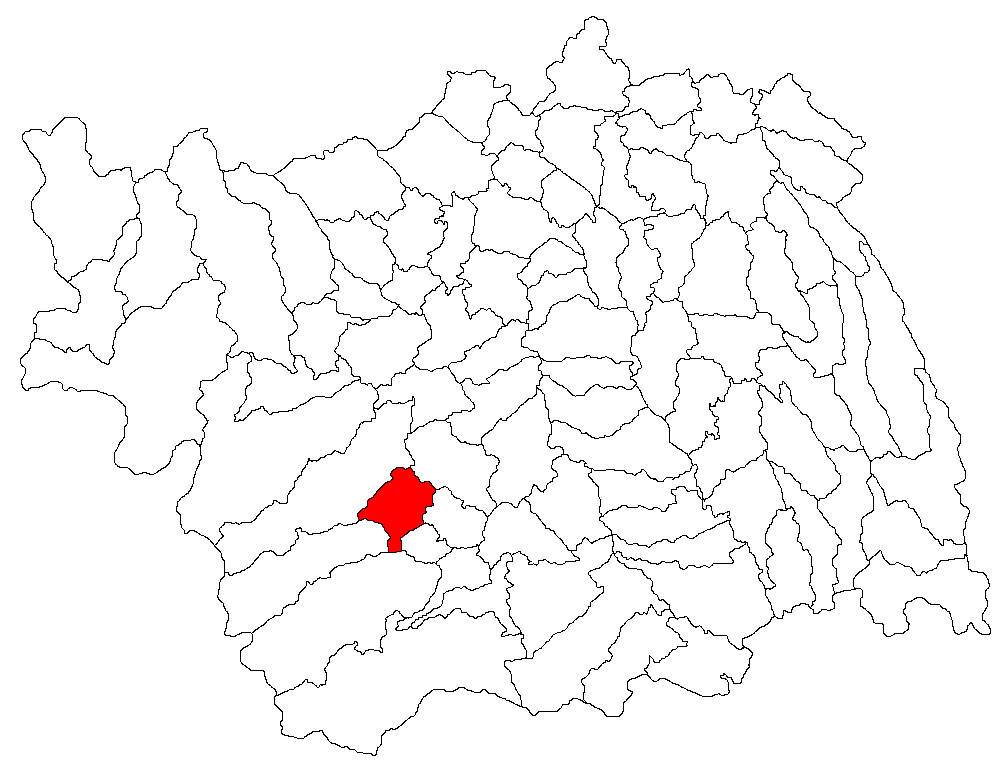
- Location in Bacău County

- Location in Romania
- Coordinates: 46°16′48″N 26°37′12″E
- Country: Romania
- County: Bacău

Government
  - Mayor (2024–2028): Cristian-Aurelian Ciubotaru (PSD)
- Area: 48.90 km^{2} (18.88 sq mi)
- Elevation: 263 m (863 ft)
- Population (2021-12-01): 10,410
  - Density: 212.9/km^{2} (551.4/sq mi)
- Time zone: UTC+02:00 (EET)
  - Summer (DST): UTC+03:00 (EEST)
- Postal code: 605600
- Area code: (+40) 02 34
- Vehicle reg.: BC
- Website: orasul-targuocna.ro

Târgu Ocna (Romanian pronunciation: [ˌtɨrɡu ˈokna]; Hungarian: Aknavásár) is a town in Bacău County, Romania. It administers two villages, Poieni and Vâlcele.

The town is situated on the left bank of the Trotuș River, an affluent of the Siret, and on a branch railway which crosses the Ghimeș Pass from Moldavia into Transylvania. Târgu Ocna is built among the Carpathian Mountains on bare hills formed of rock salt. In fact, the English translation of Ocna is salt mine.

The Târgu Ocna Salt Mine is one of the oldest and the third-largest salt mine in Romania, situated at a depth of 240 metres. It features the largest underground treatment base in the country, offering halotherapy for respiratory conditions, as well as recreational facilities and the Saint Barbara Orthodox Church, built in 1992 as the first underground Orthodox church in Europe.

Târgu Ocna's main industry is salt production, as it is the largest provider in Moldavia. Other industries include wood processing, coal mining, steel producing, and petroleum-based industries.

Historical population
Year	Pop.	±%
1900	8,033	—
1912	7,989	−0.5%
1930	12,588	+57.6%
1948	9,796	−22.2%
1956	11,227	+14.6%
1966	11,647	+3.7%
1977	12,603	+8.2%
1992	16,071	+27.5%
2002	14,184	−11.7%
2011	11,300	−20.3%
2021	10,410	−7.9%
Source: Census data

== People ==
- Gabriela Adameșteanu (born 1942), writer
- Dinu Tănase (born 1946), film director and screenwriter
- Sorin Antohi (born 1957), political scientist
- Ștefan Constantinescu (1898–1983), painter
- Miron Grindea (1909–1995), journalist
- Dan Iuga (born 1945), pistol shooter
- Grigore Marteș (1914–1973), vice admiral, commander of the Romanian Navy (1963–1973)
- Dumitru Motreanu (born 1949), mathematician
- Costache Negri (1812–1876), writer
- Mihăiță Nițulescu (c. 1969–2022), boxer
- Claude Sernet (1902–1968), poet
- Michel Sturdza (1886–1980), nobleman, diplomat, and convicted war criminal
- Ion Talianu (1898–1956), actor
- Traian Vasai (1929–2013), painter

== See also ==
- Târgu Ocna Prison
