= Rimgaila (personal name) =

Rimgaila (first name and surname), Rimgailas (masculine first name) Rimgailė (feminine first name) is a dual-stemmed pagan Lithuanian name constructed from rim- (rimti - "be calm") + gail- (*gailas - "strong"), which is quite common in Lithuania at present.

== Notable bearers ==
- Rimgailė (14th–15th centuries), Lithuanian noblewoman
- Fulgencijus Rimgaila (1805–1870), Lithuanian architect
- Robertas Rimgaila (1932–2008), Lithuanian journalist
- Rimgaila Salys, Lithuanian-American slavist
