= Wide is My Motherland =

1936 Russian patriotic song

"Широка страна моя родная"

Song
- Language: Russian
- English title: Wide is My Motherland
- Released: 1936
- Genre: Traditional Pop
- Songwriter: Vasily Lebedev-Kumach

"Wide Is My Motherland", (Note: Russian: Широка страна моя родная, romanized: Shiroká straná moyá rodnáya, IPA: [ʂɨrɐˈka strɐˈna mɐˈja rɐdˈnajə]) also known as the "Song of the Motherland", (Note: Russian: Песня о родине, romanized: Pésnya o ródine, IPA: [ˈpʲesʲnʲə ɐ‿ˈrodʲɪnʲe]) is a Soviet patriotic song from 1936. The music was composed by Isaac Dunaevsky and the lyrics were written by Vasily Lebedev-Kumach. The song was first featured in the classic Soviet film Circus.

== History ==
The song made its debut in the 1936 film Circus, starring Lyubov Orlova and Sergei Stolyarov. The film depicts the story of an American woman who flees from racism in the United States after giving birth to an African-American child. She comes to the USSR to sing as part of an act in the circus, and soon falls in love with a performance director Ivan Petrovich Martinov. As she becomes assimilated into her new surroundings, her love blossoms into a love not only for Martinov but for the Soviet motherland itself, the ideals that have refined it, and the newly found freedoms of Soviet society. The melody and chorus of the song appear throughout the film, and both parts of the final stanza are sung at the end where all the characters are seen marching in a May Day parade on Red Square.

The song gained immediate popularity. A full three-stanza recording was published in 1937. In 1939, the opening chorus notes played on vibraphone became the official call sign of Soviet radio. Later on, however, during the period of de-Stalinization, the third stanza was dropped due to its mention of Joseph Stalin. It was replaced with a new stanza emphasizing comradeship and proletarian internationalism. The song was also translated into several other languages of Eastern Bloc countries, including German and Hungarian. Since the dissolution of the Soviet Union, the song remains a popular patriotic tune in Russia.

== Lyrics ==
The third stanza of the lyrics has been removed after de-Stalinization.

Russian original

Припев:
Широка страна моя родная,
Много в ней лесов, полей и рек!
Я другой такой страны не знаю,
Где так вольно дышит человек.

I
От Москвы до самых до окраин,
С южных гор до северных морей
Человек проходит, как хозяин,
Необъятной Родиной своей.

Всюду жизнь привольно и широко,
Точно Волга полная, течёт.
Молодым везде у нас дорога,
Старикам везде у нас почёт.

Припев

II
Наши нивы глазом не обшаришь,
Не упомнишь наших городов,
Наше слово гордое – товарищ –
Нам дороже всех красивых слов.

С этим словом мы повсюду дома.
Нет для нас ни чёрных, ни цветных.
Это слово каждому знакомо,
С ним везде находим мы родных.

Припев

III
За столом у нас никто не лишний,
По заслугам каждый награждён,
Золотыми буквами мы пишем
Всенародный Сталинский закон.

Этих слов величие и славу
Никакие годы не сотрут:
— Человек всегда имеет право
На ученье, отдых и на труд!

Припев

IV
Над страной весенний ветер веет.
С каждым днём все радостнее жить,
И никто на свете не умеет
Лучше нас смеяться и любить.

Но сурово брови мы насупим,
Если враг захочет нас сломать,
Как невесту, Родину мы любим,
Бережём, как ласковую мать.

Припев

Romanization of Russian (Croatian-styled)

Pripev:
Široka strana moja rodnaja,
Mnogo v nej lesov, polej i rek!
Ja drugoj takoj strany ne znaju,
Gde tak voljno dyšit čelovek.

I
Ot Moskvy do samyh do okrain,
S južnyh gor do severnyh morej
Čelovek prohodit, kak hozjain,
Neob’jatnoj Rodinoj svojej.

Vsjudu žiznj privoljno i široko,
Točno Volga polnaja, tečjot.
Molodym vezde u nas doroga,
Starikam vezde u nas počjot.

Pripev

II
Naši nivy glazom ne obšarišj
Ne upomnišj naših gorodov,
Naše slovo gordoje – tovarišč –
Nam dorože vseh krasivyh slov.

S etim slovom my povsjudu doma.
Net dlja nas ni čjornyh, ni cvetnyh.
Eto slovo každomu znakomo,
S nim vezde nahodim my rodnyh.

Pripev

III
Za stolom u nas nikto ne lišnij,
Po zaslugam každyj nagraždjon,
Zolotymi bukvami my pišem
Vsenarodnyj Stalinskij zakon.

Etih slov veličije i slavu
Nikakije gody ne sotrut:
– Čelovek vsegda imejet pravo
Na učenje, otdyh i na trud.

Pripev

IV
Nad stranoj vesennij veter vejet.
S každym dnjom vse radostneje žitj,
I nikto na svete ne umejet
Lučše nas smejatjsja i ljubitj.

No surovo brovi my nasupim,
Jesli vrag zahočet nas slomatj,
Kak nevestu, Rodinu my ljubim,
Berežjom, kak laskovuju matj.

Pripev

English translation

Chorus:
Wide is my Motherland,
Of her many forests, fields, and rivers!
I know of no other country
Where a man can breathe so freely.

I
From Moscow to the borders,
From southern peaks to northern seas,
As the master a man stands
In his wide Motherland.

Throughout life, freely and widely,
Just like the Volga flows.
The youth are always dear to us,
The elderly always honoured by us.

Chorus

II
Too wide for the eyes are our fields,
Too many to remember are our cities.
Our proud word – comrade –
There's no word dearer to us.

Everywhere with this word we feel at home.
For us there are no blacks nor coloreds.
This word is familiar to everyone,
Everywhere with it we find friends.

Chorus

III
At our table no one is excluded,
Everyone is rewarded on merit,
In golden letters we write
The National Stalin Law.

These great and glorious words
Shall live through the years:
A person always has the right
To study, rest, and work.

Chorus

IV
Over the country, the spring breeze blows.
Everyday life becomes more joyful,
And no one on earth knows better
Than us how to laugh and love.

But our brows shall frown sternly
If an enemy attempts to break us.
As a bride, we love our Motherland,
We protect her like a gentle mother.

Chorus

== See also ==
- Culture of the Soviet Union
- Cinema of the Soviet Union
- List of socialist songs
