= Kashchey =

Koschei or Kashchey is an archetypal male antagonist in Russian folklore, often given the epithet "the Immortal", or "the Deathless".

Kashchey may also refer to:

- Kashchey the Immortal (film) is a 1945 black and white Soviet fantasy film.
- Kashchey Bessmertnyi (album) is a 1994 album by Russian punk group Sektor Gaza.
- Kashchey the Deathless, a one-act opera in three scenes by Nikolai Rimsky-Korsakov.
- Kashchey the Deathless (Vasnetsov), a 1926 painting by Viktor Vasnetsov
