= Isaak Dunayevsky =

Soviet composer and conductor (1900–1955)

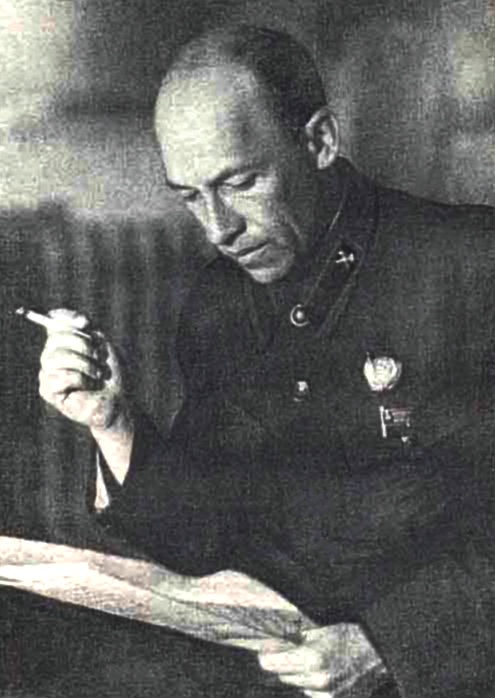
Isaak Dunayevsky

Isaak Osipovich Dunayevsky (Russian: Исаак Осипович Дунаевский; also transliterated as Dunaevski or Dunaevskiy; 30 January [O.S. 18 January] 1900 – 25 July 1955) was a Soviet film composer and conductor of the 1930s and 1940s, who composed music for operetta and film comedies, frequently working with the film director Grigori Aleksandrov.

== Biography ==
Dunayevsky was born to a Jewish family in Lokhvytsia in the Poltava Governorate of the Russian Empire (now Myrhorod Raion, Poltava Oblast, Ukraine) in 1900. He studied at the Kharkiv Musical School in 1910 where he studied violin under Konstanty Gorski and Joseph Achron. During this period he started to study the theory of music under Semyon Bogatyrev (1890–1960). He graduated in 1919 from the Kharkiv National Kotlyarevsky University of Arts. At first he was a violinist, the leader of the orchestra in Kharkov. Then he started a conducting career. In 1924 he went to Moscow to run the Theatre Hermitage. In 1929 he worked for the first time for a music hall ("To the icy place") with the Moscow music hall and began collaborating with Leonid Utesov. Later, he worked in Leningrad (1929–1941) as a director and conductor of the Saint Petersburg Music Hall (1929–34), and then moved to Moscow to work on his own operettas and film music.

Dunayevsky wrote 14 operettas, 3 ballets, 3 cantatas, 80 choruses, 80 songs and romances, music for 88 plays and 42 films, 43 compositions for light music orchestra and 12 for jazz orchestra, 17 melodeclamations, 52 compositions for symphony orchestra and 47 piano compositions and a string quartet. Among other works, he set to music Mikhail Svetlov's ‘Song of Kakhovka’, written in 1935, which became extremely popular.

He was one of the first composers in the Soviet Union to start using jazz. He wrote the music for three of the most important films of the pre-war Stalinist era, Jolly Fellows, Circus and the film said to be Stalin's favorite film Volga-Volga, all directed by Grigori Aleksandrov.

In a reply to the British book The World of Music, he listed the following as his chief works: The Golden Valley operetta (1937), The Free Wind operetta (1947), and music to the films Circus (1935) and The Kuban Cossacks (1949).

He died of a heart attack in Moscow in 1955. His last piece, the operetta White Acacia (1955), was left unfinished at his death. It was completed by Kirill Molchanov and staged on 15 November 1955, in Moscow.

A previously unknown opera libretto Rachel (1943) by Mikhail Bulgakov, was later found in his archive. The libretto was based on Guy de Maupassant's Mademoiselle Fifi and was published in a book by Naum Shafer (see references and links below).

A book of his essays and memoirs was published in 1961.

== Honors ==
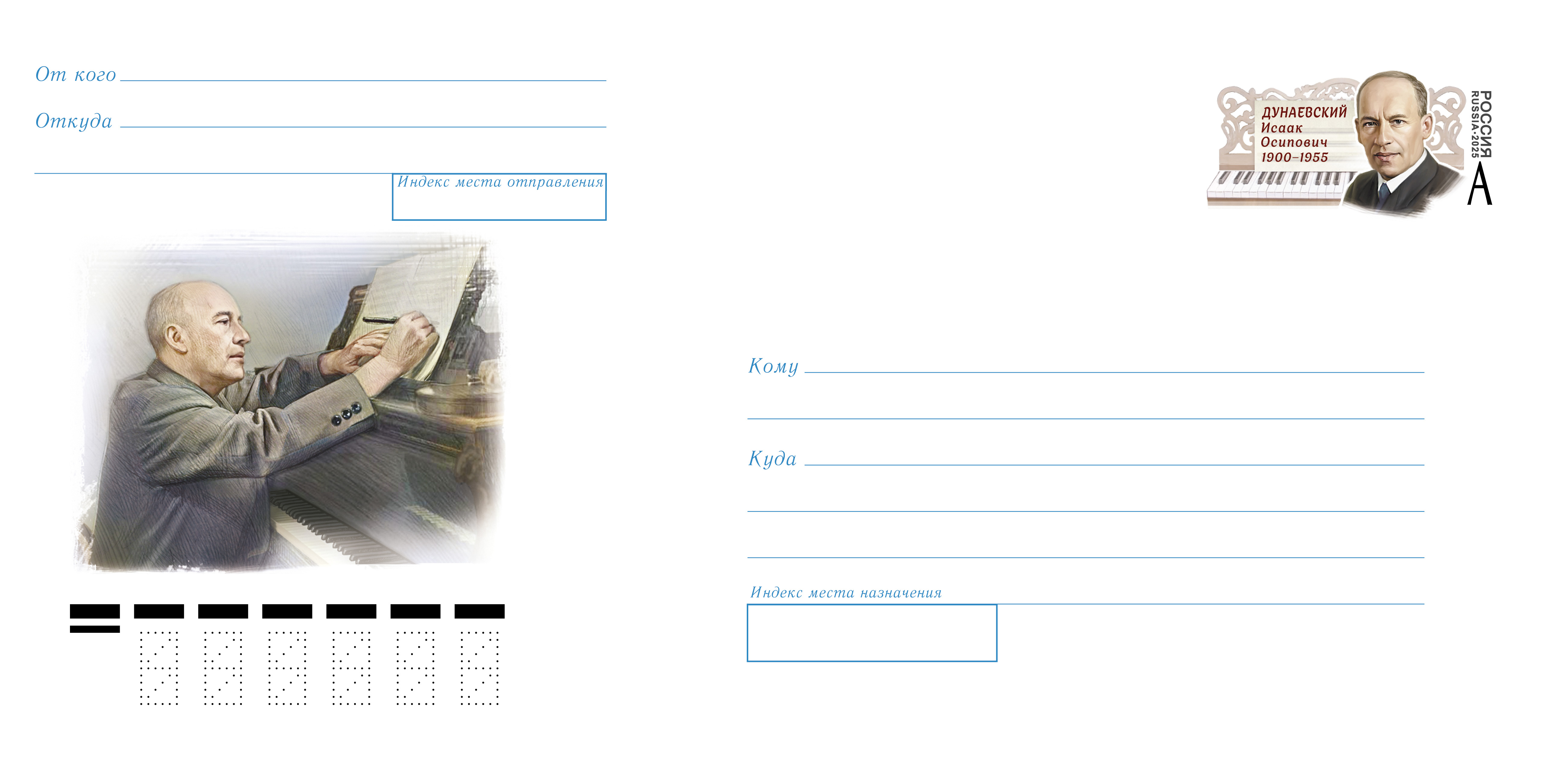
Dunaevsky on a 2025 postal cover of Russia

Dunayevsky was named a People's Artist of the RSFSR in 1950. He was twice awarded the Stalin Prize (1941, 1951) and received two orders and many medals (including Order of the Red Banner of Labour, Order of the Red Star, and Order of the Badge of Honour).

The asteroid (4306) Dunayevsky is named in his honour.

== Family ==
His brother Semyon (1906–1986) was a conductor; another brother, Zinovy (1908–1981), was a composer.

Dunayevsky was married once. He had a son Yevgeny (b. 1932) by his wife Zinaida Sudeikina, and another son Maksim (b. 1945) by his lover, the ballerina Zoya Pashkova (1922—30.01.1991). Maksim is also a well-known composer.

The American journalist Vladislav Davidzon is a descendent of the composer.

The American drag performer Plane Jane (Andrew Dunayevskiy), who appeared on Season 16 of RuPaul's Drag Race, is a distant relative of Dunayevsky.

== Works ==
- The Tranquillity of the Faun, ballet (1924)
- Murzilka, ballet for children (1924)
- For Us and You, operetta (1924)
- Bridegrooms (Женихи), operetta (1926)
- The Knives (Ножи), operetta (1928)
- To the icy place, operetta (1929)
- Million Langours, operetta (1932)
- Jolly Fellows (Весёлые ребята), film music (1934), including "Serdtse"
- Three Friends (Три товарища), film music (1935)
- Late for a Date (Девушка спешит на свидание), film music (1936)
- Seekers of Happiness (Искатели счастья), film music (1936)
- Circus (Цирк), film music (1936), including the popular song "Wide is My Motherland"
- The Children of Captain Grant (Дети капитана Гранта), film music (1936), including two songs and the famous orchestral overture
- The Golden Valley (Золотая долина), operetta (1937)
- Volga-Volga (Волга-Волга), film music (1938)
- The Roads to Happiness (Дороги к счастью), operetta (1939)
- My Love (Моя любовь). film music (1940)
- Moscow, suite for solo voices, chorus and orchestra (1941)
- The Wind of Liberty (Вольный ветер), operetta (1947)
- Cossacks of the Kuban (Кубанские казаки), film music (1949)
- Oh, The Blooming Red Guelder Flower (Ой, цветет калина), (1949), film music
- The Son of the Clown (Сын клоуна), operetta (1950)
- Fly, Pigeons (летите голуби), film music (1951), known for being a warning for gay men
- Glory of the Railwaymen, cantata
- Our Homeland May Flourish!, cantata
- Ballet Suite for orchestra
- Suite on Chinese themes, orchestra
- Rhapsody on Songs of the people of the Soviet Union, jazz orchestra
- The Music Store, jazz orchestra
- String Quartet
- Song of the Fatherland, film music
- Requiem, narrator and quintet
- Song of Stalin, chorus and orchestra
- Moscow Lights (Московские Огни), (1954), film music
- White Acacia (Белая акация), operetta (1955, completed by Kirill Molchanov)
- Quiet, Everything Quiet (Тихо, всё тихо), the sign-off tune of the Soviet television until 1991.

Also:

- Songs
- Pieces for chamber orchestra
- Incidental music for theatre and cinema

== See also ==
- Maksim Dunayevsky

== Bibliography ==
- Kommissarskaya, M Dunayevsky, the article in "Tvorcheskiye biografii Kompozitorov", Moscow, 1989 (in Russian)
- Shafer, Naum “Dunayevsky Today” Moscow, Sovetsky Kompozitor, 1988 (in Russian)
