= Ilya Bachurin =

Russian film and TV producer

- Илья Бачурин
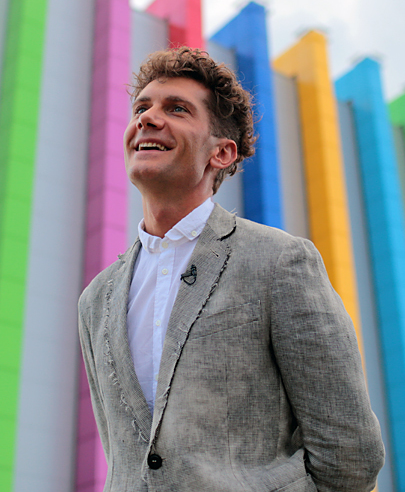
- Born: May 29, 1970 (age 56); Moscow, USSR
- Education: Russian State University of Tourism and Services Studies
- Occupations: film producer, TV producer, media manager
- Employer(s): Glavkino, Mosconcert

Ilya Viktorovich Bachurin (Russian: Илья Викторович Бачурин; born 29 May 1970) is a Russian film and TV producer, top manager at Russian film company Glavkino and music company Mosconcert. In the past he organized a number of notable Russian cultural events such as Russian parts of Eurovision song contest, Olympic Games in Russia and others. He is also particularly known as the organizer of Michael Jackson's first concert in Russia back in 1993 and as the creator of dance music radio station Station 106,8 popular in 1990s.

== Biography ==
Ilya Bachurin was born in Moscow on May 29, 1970, to a family of engineers. After finishing Moscow's school No. 27 in 1988 served in Soviet Army until 1990. He has sports ranks: Candidate for Master of Sports in athletics and Category I degree in motocross. Later in 1998 he received a degree in economy at Russian State University of Tourism and Services Studies.

In 1992 Bachurin established his own commercial company called "Dessa" which became the organizer of the first ever Russian performance of Michael Jackson in 1993, where Bachurin took important part. It became a landmark event at the time as such event was not possible in recently dissolved USSR and was considered very notable. It became a surprise for general Russian music industry of that time because "Dessa" company was not a part of it, and Bachurin's actions were based on his and his colleagues' personal communications, not on regular music business interactions. As Bachurin told the press, "men with assault rifles", representing that-time Russian music industry, came to him and tried to convince him that he "didn't have the right" to organize such event.

In 1995 he co-founded music radio station called Station 106,8 which became very popular as it introduced world's dance music to the people of former USSR, where citizens lived in cultural isolation due to Iron Curtain. The station was active until 2001.

In 2000 Ilya Bachurin started working at Russian TV and was appointed a head of Music Broadcasting Department at Russia's top TV channel Channel One where participated in a number of projects. In particular, he organized Russian broadcastings of Grammy Award and Eurovision ceremonies, was one of the creators of Fabrika Zvyozd music TV show etc. He was reportedly involved in Channel One's getting rid of "paid" low-quality Russian music videos, which dominated in 1990s.

In 2003 he began to work at MTV Russia at several top positions including Editor-in-Chief. Worked as producer general at MTV Russia Music Awards ceremonies. He was a member of jury at Russia's Eurovision entries (e.g. in 2002, in 2005 and in 2006), member of other juries and committees.

In 2006 he was appointed Editor-in-Chief at "Music of Channel One" cable TV channel.

In 2007 Ilya Bachurin worked as creative producer at 19th World Festival of Youth and Students in Sochi.

In 2008 he established the TV and film company Glavkino together with prominent Russian filmmaker Fyodor Bondarchuk. The company makes and distributes content for cinema and TV.

Ilya Bachurin lectured entertainment industry management for students at State University of Management and at Moscow State Institute of International Relations.

He also produced ceremony of olympic flag transfer in Vancouver during 2010 Winter Olympics and was a vice president of Organizing Committees at 2014 Winter Olympics and 2014 Winter Paralympics.

In 2017, he was a creative producer of the VFMS in Sochi.

Since 2019, he hosts his own TV program called "News. In details. Cinema" at Russia-K TV channel dedicated to culture.

In 2019–2021, he was the Director General at a cable TV company called TV BRICS.

On April 12, 2021, he was appointed as General Director of the State Budgetary Institution of Culture of the city of Moscow “Mosconcert”. In 2022, he became the organizer of the Mosconcert's cultural brigades.

Bachurin is a participant in the organizing committee of Russian creative weeks and premiums in the field of creative industries.

== Filmography ==
Year	Movie	Role
2011	Iconoscope (director Vitaly Mansky)	producer
2012	August Eighth (director Dzhanik Fayziev)	producer
2015	Eternal cold (director Andrey Migachev)	producer
2015	The Water of Life (director Rezo Gigineishvili)	producer
2016	Army, I love you!	producer
2016	Helicopters	producer
2016	My boyfriend is a robot	producer
2019	Running to Arizona	producer
