= Glavkino =

Film studio in Russia

Coordinates: 55°46′43″N 37°14′24″E

GlavKino
- Company type: Corporation
- Industry: Motion pictures
- Founded: 2008
- Headquarters: Krasnogorsk, Moscow Oblast, Russia
- Key people: Fyodor Bondarchuk, Konstantin Ernst and Ilya Bachurin (Chairman)
- Products: Motion pictures Television programs
- Number of employees: 1,500
- Website: glavkino.ru

Glavkino (Russian: Главкино, pronounced [ˈɡlʲavkʲɪnə]) is a film studio in Russia. The studio includes a self-titled TV Movie complex, a production company, and lab scenarios.

The Concern was founded in 2008 by Fyodor Bondarchuk, Konstantin Ernst and Ilya Bachurin. 50% of the concern is owned by Fyodor Bondarchuk, Konstantin Ernst, Ilya Bachurin and "Uralsib" Bank, another 50% is owned by the private investor Vitaly Golovachov. Glavkino complex is located in the Krasnogorsk municipal district of Moscow region. The first movie filmed by Glavkino was August Eighth.

== Filmography ==
- 2012: August Eighth / Август Восьмого
