= Olympus Inferno =

- Directed by: Igor Voloshin
- Written by: Denis Rodimin; Nikolay Popov; Alexey Kublitsky; Stanislav Dovzhik
- Screenplay by: Dzhanik Fayziev; Michael A. Lerner
- Produced by: Leonid Petrov; Alexey Kublitsky; Stanislav Dovzhik
- Starring: David Henry; Polina Filonenko
- Cinematography: Igor Grinyakin
- Music by: Ivan Titov; Flossie Bjarnason
- Production company: Channel One
- Release date: March 29, 2009 (Russia)
- Running time: 85 minutes
- Country: Russia
- Languages: Russian; Georgian; Ossetian; English

Olympus Inferno (Russian: Олимпиус Инферно) is a 2008 Russian propaganda film about the Russo-Georgian War. It follows an entomologist searching for a fictional species of moth native to the region, known by the eponymous Latin name of "olympus inferno". It was the first feature film on the subject of the 2008 war to be released, with characters speaking a mix of Russian, English, and Georgian. The film was released half a year after the conflict. The name of the film belongs to an invented species of butterfly, the "Olympus Inferno," which in the film is sought in South Ossetia by an American entomologist and a Russian journalist. The name "Olympus Inferno" was coined by director Igor Voloshin.

== Plot ==
The film begins with a director discussing a screenplay for a possible film about the Ossetia war with a screenwriter.

Michael Orraya, an American entomologist, is requesting a visa to Georgia, so he can get to South Ossetia. At the same time, Zhenya, an old schoolmate of Michael's and a Russian journalist, is doing the same, however, they are told conflicting information. Michael is going to make a film about a rare type of moth, and Zhenya is coming at the request of Michael's father. When they arrive, they are told by Akhsar, a resident, that the Georgians are leaving the village. They are coming to the conclusion that something is going to happen in the village soon. However, the Ossetians are not preparing take measures, especially after the airing of a televised speech of Georgian President Mikheil Saakashvili. The events take place the evening of 7 August 2008.

Late in the evening, Michael and Zhenya set up special cameras in a nature reserve in order to film the moth, the Olympus Inferno. During the night while goofing around in the reserve, the two are taken prisoner by Georgian forces. Thanks to the interference of an American military officer, the Georgians clarify that Michael is not a Russian, but an American. He is released and requests that Zhenya also be let go, claiming that she is his fiancée. At that moment, the Georgian tanks head for the road to Tskhinvali. In response to Michael's question about what is going on, the American officer answers: "Constitutional order operation!" Zhenya screams, "It's war!" and she and Michael run away. Zhenya and Michael return to their recording equipment to find footage of the Olympus Inferno moth, as well as footage of the Georgian offensive in the same video. The two take the disc and all of their equipment and hide it in a neighboring building that is the remnants of a destroyed church. But it becomes clear that Zhenya has the disc of the Georgian offensive on South Ossetia. And then a hunt is declared on Zhenya and Michael, who then decide to make their way to Russian peacekeepers in Tskhinvali.

Along the road to the town they come across its residents, who say that Tskhinvali is being bombed. Initially the residents ask Zhenya and Michael who they are. Zhenya answers that they both are Russian. The residents then give them something to eat and drink. Among the Ossetians is a guy named Gabo, who is eager to fight with Georgian forces. However, his mother will not let him go. When at the crossroads (they are walking along train tracks) it becomes clear that their path leads to a different part of Tskhinvali, Gabo's mother releases him so he can escort the protagonists.

== Cast ==
- Henry David — Michael
- Polina Filonenko — Zhenya
- Vadim Tsallati — Vakho, captain of Georgian counter-intelligence
- Adgur Maliya — Akhsar
- Elena Khramova — Akhsar's wife
- Artur Gurgenyan — Gabo
- Venera Skveriya — Gabo's mother
- Adgur Dzheniya — Viktor Andreyevich, colonel-peacekeeper
- Sergey Sanguliya — Georgian colonel
- Ruslan Shakaya — Georgian lieutenant
- Martin Cook — journalist
- Anatoliy Fokht — operator
- Denis Pertskheliya — journalists' driver
- Piter Elad — Captain Adams, American instructor in the Georgian army
- Nathan Stowell — news anchor
- Natalya Papaskiri — woman at the information bureau
- Aleksandr Mkrtchyan — Vakho's agent
- Sabina Akhmedova — Jessica
- Vladimir Sorokolita — "director"
- Anton Stepanenko — "screenwriter"

== Awards ==
In 2009, film was nominated for five TEFI (film, actress (Polina Filonenko), cameraman (Igor Grinyakin), producer (Alexei Kublitskiy) and director of sound (Ivan Titov)), but won only two (cameraman and director of sound).

== See also ==
- August Eighth
- 5 Days of War
