= Nikita the Tanner =

Eastern European fairy tale set in Kyiv

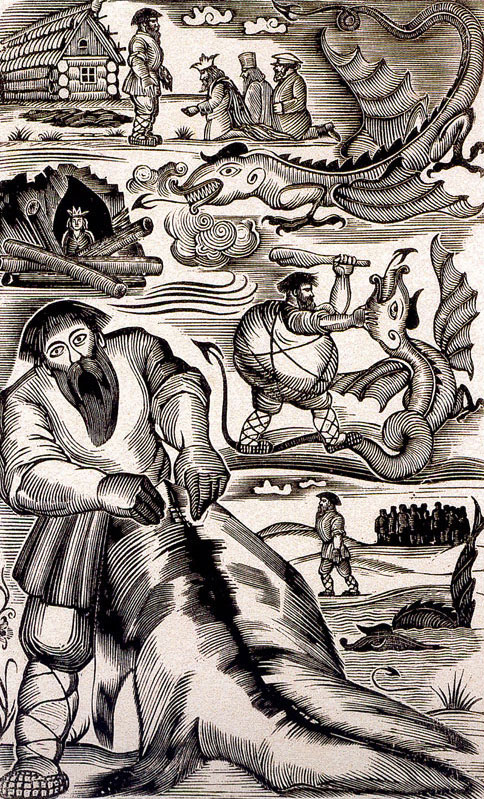
A wood engraving of Nikita

"Nikita the Tanner", also Nikita Kozhemyaka (Russian: «Никита Кожемяка»), or Mykyta Kozhumyaka (Ukrainian: «Мики́та Кожум'я́ка») is an Eastern European fairy tale set in Kyiv. The main character is an East Slavic folk hero (bogatyr), a character from a legend. In some sources he is called Kirill or Kyrylo the Tanner (Russian: Кирилл Кожемяка, Ukrainian: Кирило Кожум'я́ка), sometimes Elijah the Tailor (Russian: Илья Швец, Ukrainian: Ілля Швець). The oldest source on it could be found in the Laurentian Codex of the Primary Chronicle.

== The legend ==
This Eastern European fairy tale set in Kyiv begins when a Slavic dragon, Zmey Gorynych, attacks the lands of the Kievan Rus', taking beautiful girls as prisoners. One day the dragon kidnapped the daughter of the Kievan prince. To find out the dragon's weakness, the Kievan prince's daughter pretended to fall in love with the dragon. Gorynych revealed to the prince's daughter there was only one person who could defeat him: a tanner from Kyiv named Nikita. The princess then told this secret to her pigeon, who then flew to alert her father, the prince. The prince went to Nikita the tanner's house to ask for help. The Kievan prince found it difficult to persuade Nikita into fighting. Nikita (a bogatyr) refused the wealth and power that the prince offered him. Eventually, the Kievan prince gathered hundreds of children in front of Nikita's house, who begged Nikita to save them from Gorynych's attacks. Only then did Nikita agree to fight.

Nikita then went to Gorynych's lair, and, after a long fight, had the dragon heavily beaten with his heavy wooden club. Frightened, the dragon offered Nikita to become allies and rule the world together. Nikita demanded that they split the world and plow the border of their halves, then used the dragon to pull the plow instead of a plowing horse. After they plowed a furrow across the land, Nikita demanded that they plow further to divide the sea as well. The foolish Gorynych obeyed and ultimately drowned.

== In popular culture ==
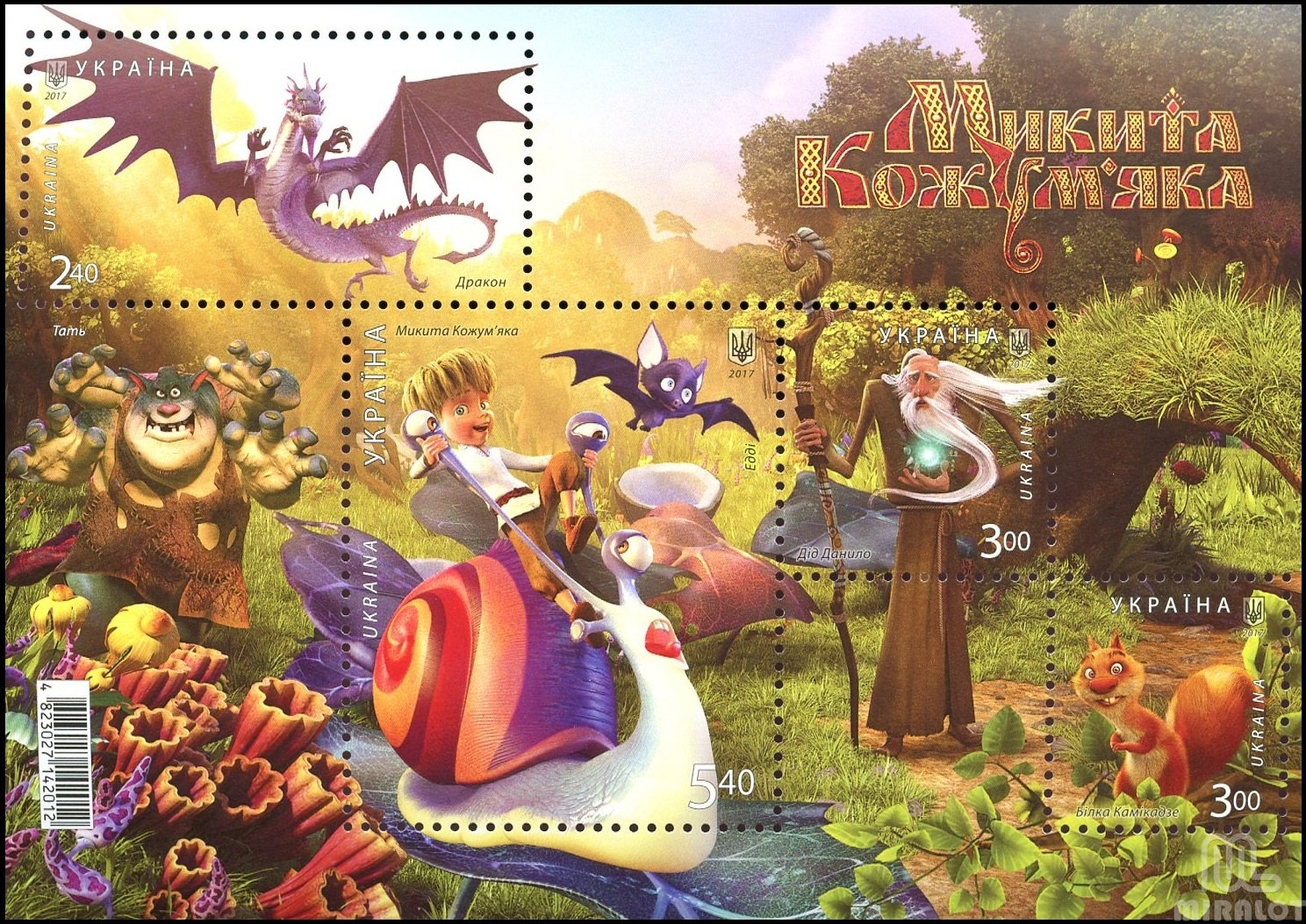
Mykyta Kozhumyaka, postal service stamp sheet, Ukraine, 2017

=== Media ===
- In Kashchey the Immortal (1945), Sergei Stolyarov was in the role of Nikita. The film is loosely inspired by the legend and combines characters from various Russian folk tales.
- Mykyta Kozhumyaka (animated short film created by Kyivnaukfilm, 1965) replaces the dragon with a nomadic horde.
- Nikita Kozhemyaka (animated short, 2008) - an episode in the Mountain of Gems series of shorts, it is a relatively faithful, albeit comical, adaptation of the legend.
- Gorynych the Snake (Змій Горинич) was featured in Ukraine's Ukranimafilm's 2014 animated film, Babay.
- The Dragon Spell / Mykyta Kozhumyaka (animated feature film, 2016) - loosely inspired by the legend, the main protagonist is Mykyta's son.
- Mykyta Kozhumyaka, Ukrposhta postal service stamp sheet, Ukraine, 2017

=== Landmarks ===
- "Kozhumyaky" district in Kyiv, Ukraine.

== See also ==
- Dobrynya Nikitich
- Simon the Tanner

== Literature ==
- Warner, Elizabeth (2002). Russian myths, illustrated. Legendary past. British Museum. p. 80. ISBN 9780714127439.
- Haney, Jack V. (1999). Russian Wondertales: Tales of heroes and villains. M.E. Sharpe. p. 135. ISBN 9781563244896.
- A poem "Mykyta Kozhem'jaka" by Oleksandr Oles' (in Ukrainian)
