= Tatiana Sorokina =

Russian singer (born 1970)

Tatiana Sorokina Татьяна Сорокина
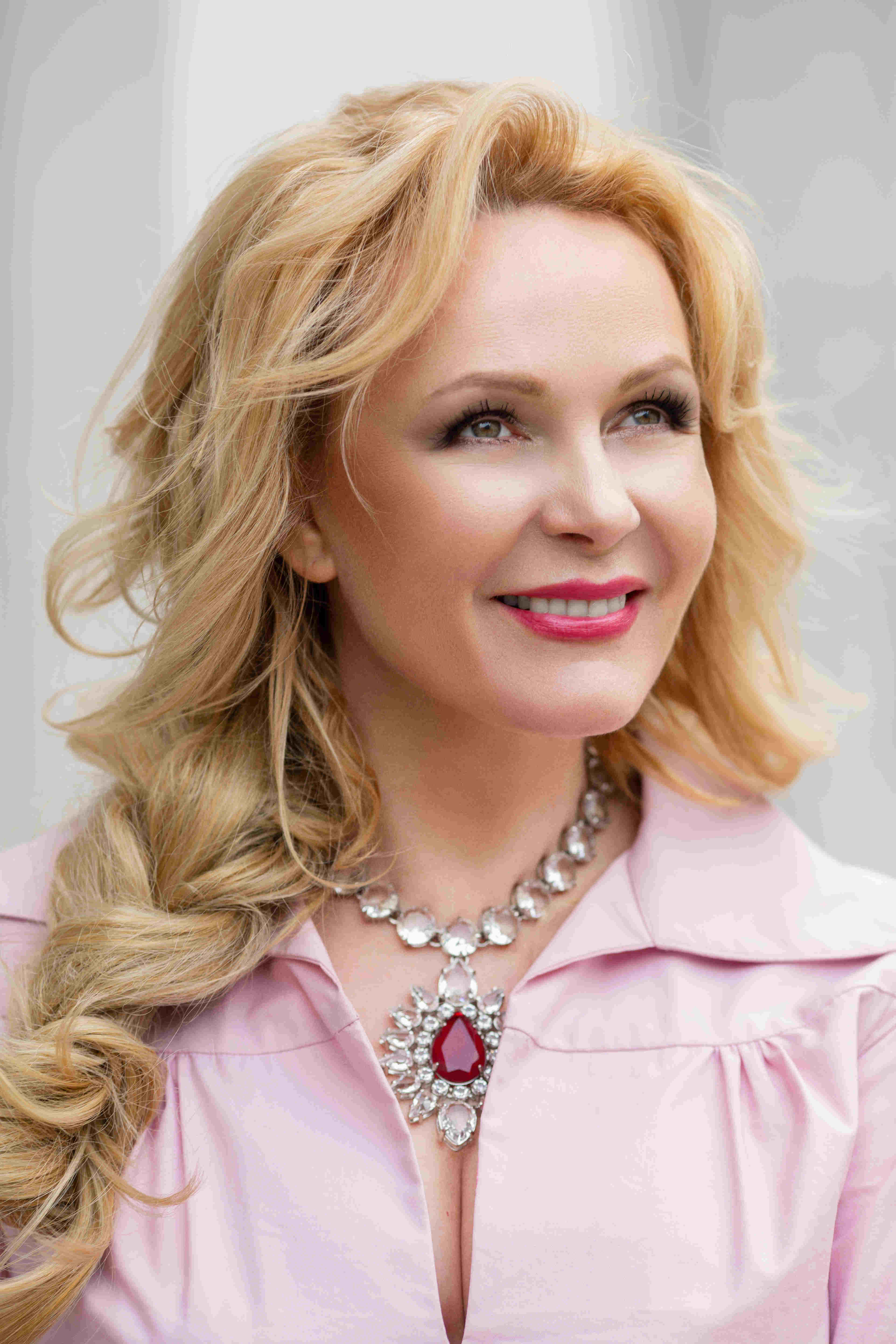
- Tatiana Sorokina
- Born: Tatiana Ivanovna Sorokina; 23 April 1970 (age 56); Moscow, Russian SFSR, USSR
- Education: Kazakh National Conservatory
- Occupation: Singer
- Years active: 1996–present
- Height: 1.64 m (5 ft 5 in)
- Musical career
- Genres: Pop, opera, operetta, romance (music)
- Instrument: Singing
- Website: www.tatyanasorokina.ru

Tatiana Sorokina (Russian: Татьяна Ивановна Сорокина, born 23 April 1970 in Moscow) is a Russian singer.

== Biography ==
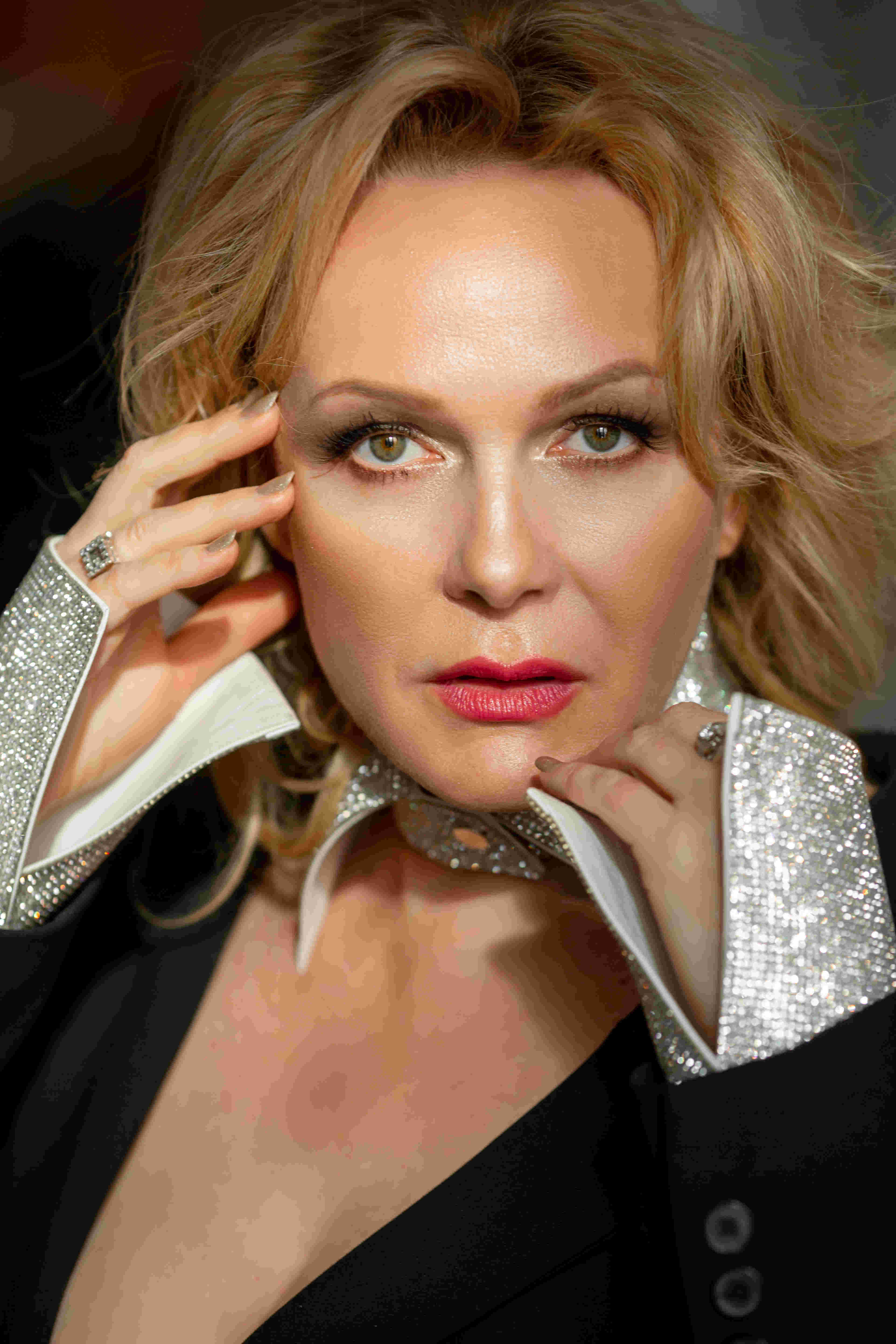
Tatiana Sorokina

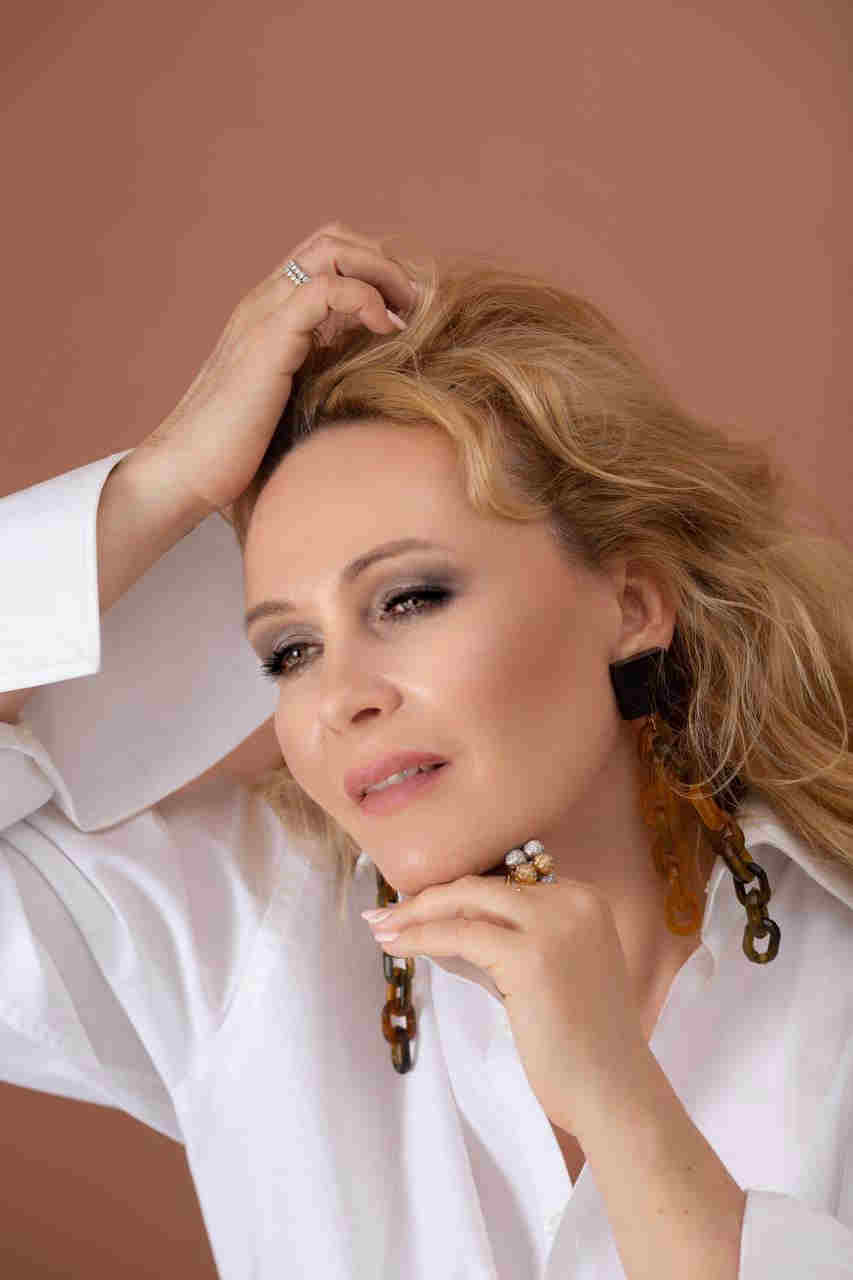
Tatiana Sorokina

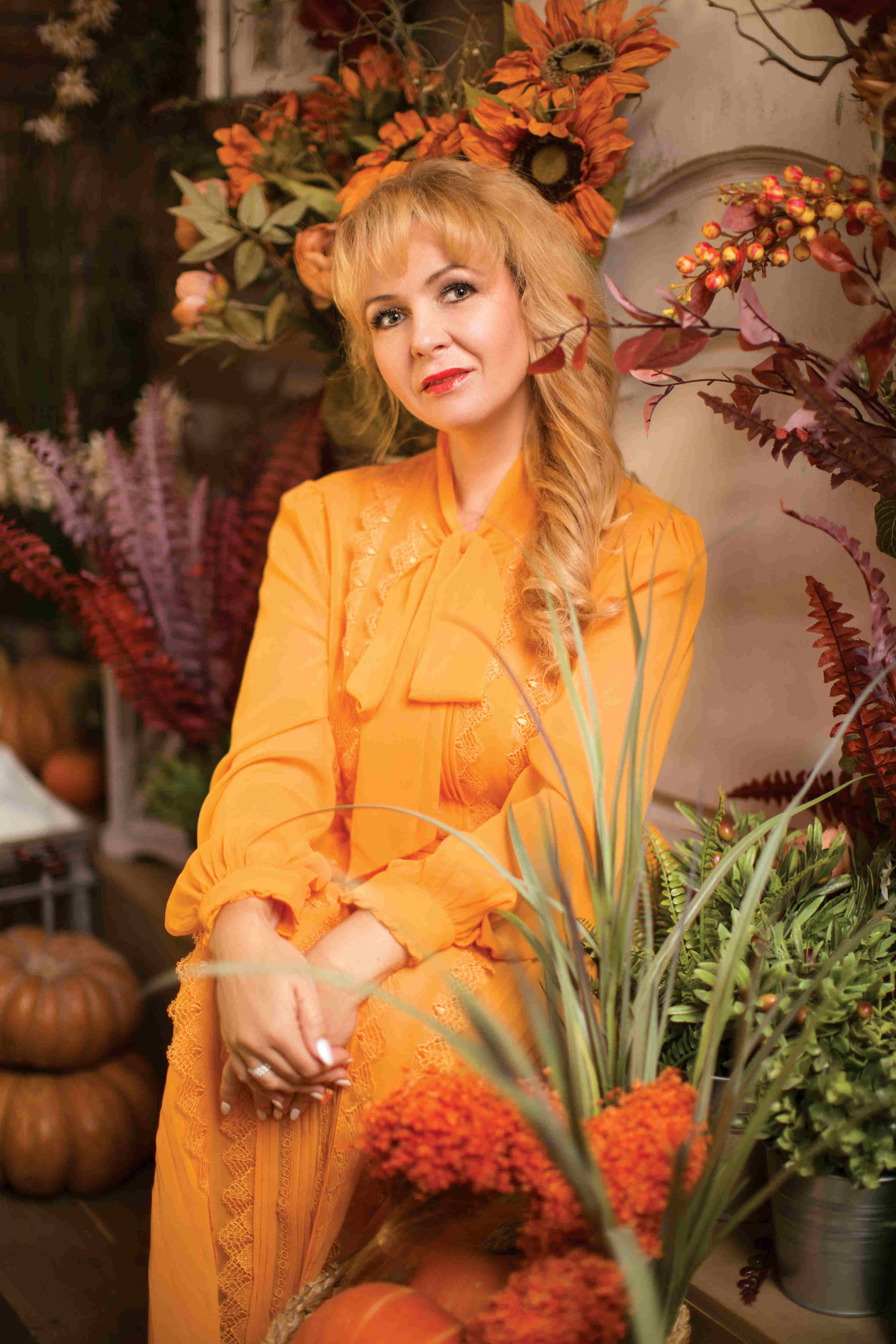
Tatiana Sorokina

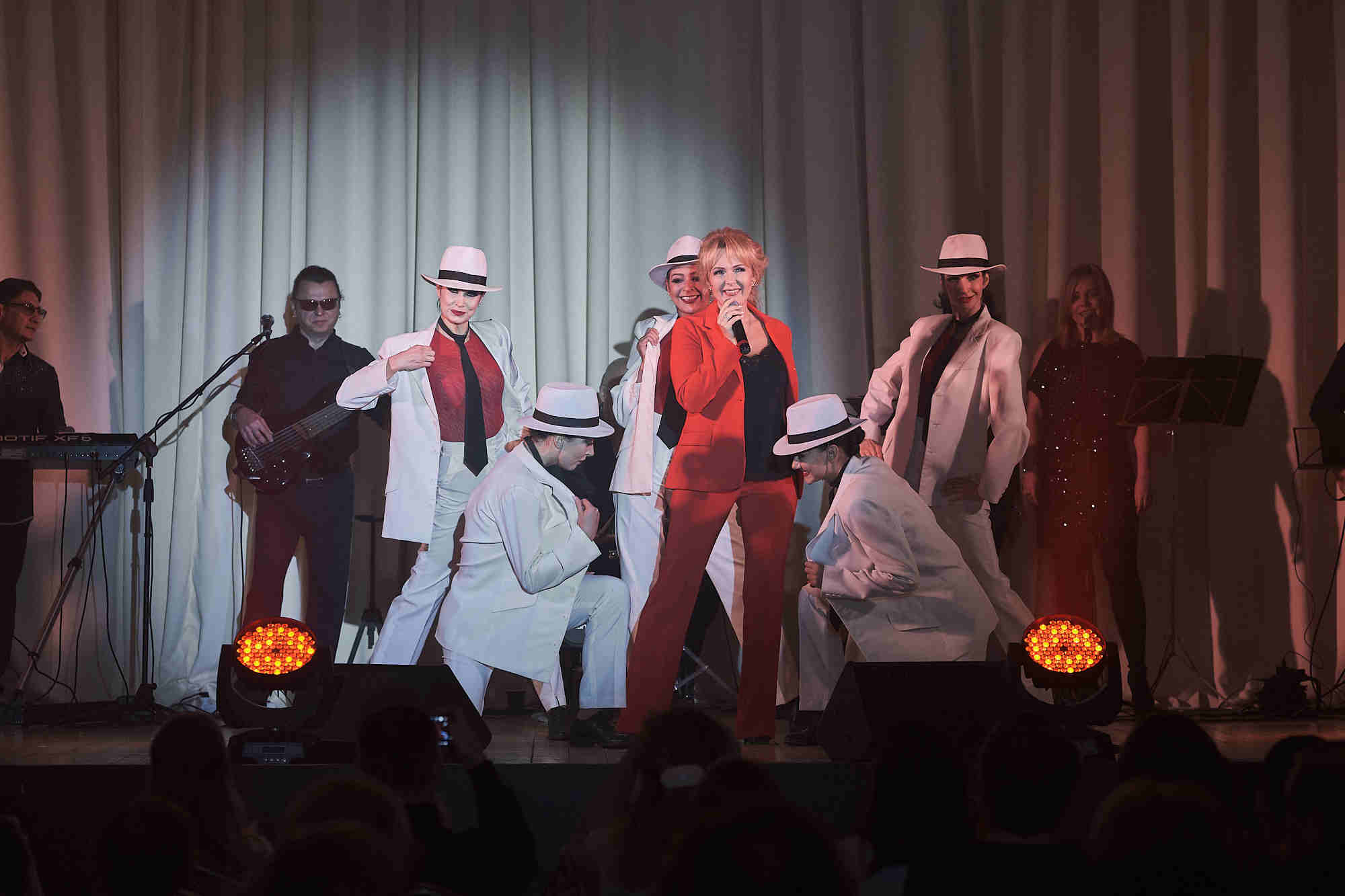
Сорокина Татьяна певица Москонцерт, 2019

Tatiana Sorokina was born on 23 April 1970 in Moscow, into a military family. Since her early childhood Tatiana knew that she wanted to be a singer. She graduated from the Alma-Ata Tchaikovsky Music College in the vocal class in 1991. After college, from 1991 to 2001, she worked as a soloist of the song and dance ensemble of the Eastern Border District of the Republic of Kazakhstan. She participates in concerts in military garrisons at this time. In 1991, she entered the Kazakh National Conservatory at the Department of Solo Singing. She is qualified as an opera and concert performer and a vocal teacher. Tatiana is finishing her postgraduate studies of the Kazakh National Conservatory 1999–2001. During her studies, she takes part in various music competitions and festivals.

=== Career ===
In 2001, Tatiana joined the Kazakh National Academic Opera and Ballet Theater named after Abai (Alma-Ata) as a leading soloist of the opera. Until 2011, she performed the main parts of the theater's repertoire: «La traviata», «Rigoletto», «The Barber of Seville», «La bohème», «Die Fledermaus». From 1998 to 2001, she taught vocals at the N. I. Sats Youth Theater in Alma-Ata<. Tatiana Sorokina moved to Moscow in 2011 and since that time has been working as a soloist in the Mosconcert. She taught vocal at Moscow State Pedagogical University in 2016–2019. Now Tatiana conducts concert activities, solo concerts, she has released two of her albums: «One hundred roads, one mine» (2019) and «Heart and destiny» (2020). Tatiana works with Russian singers: Ekaterina Semenova, Sergei Trofimov, A. Zubkov, S. Bakumenko, K. Gubin and songwriters: L. Voropaeva, E. Muravyev, V. Arkanov, etc. In 2019, Tatiana recorded the soundtrack for the TV series «Marusya» and the soundtrack for the TV series «Believe Fixed». In addition to singing, she appears in films, participates in TV programs.

Tatiana Sorokina has performed at such venues as the State Kremlin Palace, Crocus City Hall, Moscow International House of Music, Mosconcert Hall, Gradsky Hall and many others, and also abroad (Cyprus and other countries).

== Awards ==
=== State awards ===
- Awarded with a diploma «For services to the state» Nazarbayev.
- Letter of thanks from the Representative Office of Rossotrudnichestvo in the Republic of Cyprus
- Awarded the prize of the Parliamentary Club and Leaders Today magazine «Leaders Today 2021».

=== Music awards ===
Laureate of the International Competitions named after E. Serkebayev and K. Baiseitova.

== TV series ==
- «Corrected to believe»
- «Marusya»

== Personal life ==
Tatiana Sorokina has a husband and three children.
