= Saint Petersburg Music Hall =

Theater in Saint Petersburg, Russia

Coordinates: 59°57′19″N 30°18′38″E

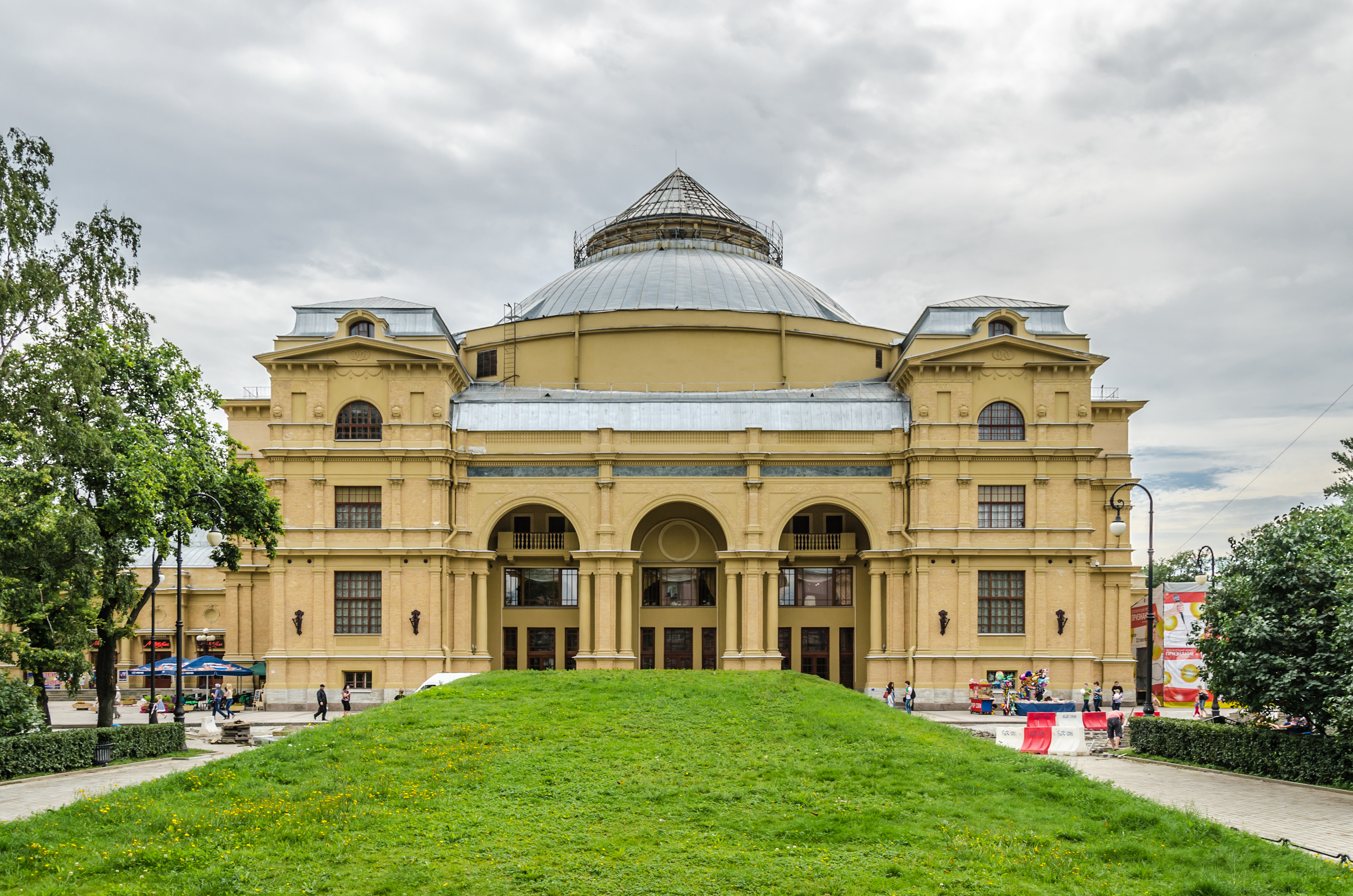
The front facade of the St. Petersburg Music Hall

The St. Petersburg Music Hall is a Russian state theater in the city of Saint Petersburg. It was founded in 1928.

== History ==
On December 5, 1928 Leningrad music hall opened with the premiere of “The Wonders of XX century or The Last Carrier” (directed by David Gutman) in the Opera Hall of the People’s House. The theater became very popular thanks to cooperation between O.Dunaevsky and ‘Thea-jazz’ of Leonid Utyosov. Starting from 1929 Dunaevsky became music director and principal conductor of the music hall. The troupe of the theater created several vocal-instrumental programs where L.Utesov and K.Shulzhenko were singing the leading parts. In 1937, Leningrad music hall was closed as a carrier of market-based bourgeois art.

In 1966 the second version of Leningrad music hall was born in Leningrad. It was founded and started its work under artistic supervision of Ilya Yakovlevich Rakhlin. During the period from 1966 till 1988 music hall was operating in the Palace of Culture of local administration. Here music hall staged all its premieres. At the end of 1970s the building of the Opera Hall of the People’s House was given to the revived music hall. However, the theater was able to open its doors for new spectators only in 1988. In April 1987 I. Y. Rakhlin opened special classes for kids, which operates in the theater even today.

From 2002 till 2004 the theatre was led by the son of I. Y. Rakhlin, Lev Rakhlin (worked as the stage director from 1996).

== Building ==
Music Hall is located in the building of the Lecture Hall of the People’s House that was built upon an initiative of Prince A. P. Ol’denburgsky by architect from the Royal Court, G. I. Lyucedarsky in 1910-1912.

== See also ==
- Moscow music hall
- Music Hall
