= James Lloydovich Patterson =

Russian-born American writer, naval officer and child actor (1933–2025)

- Джеймс Ллойдович Паттерсон
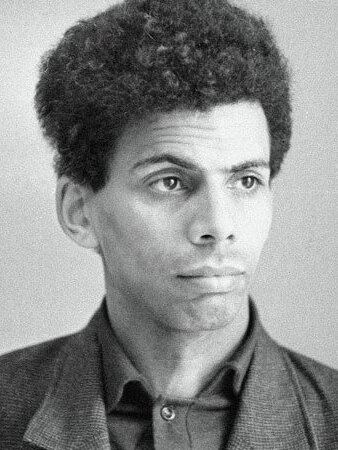
- Patterson c. 1970
- Born: 17 July 1933; Moscow, Russian SFSR, USSR
- Died: 22 May 2025 (aged 91); Washington, D.C., U.S.
- Occupations: Poet; actor
- Writing career
- Period: 1936 (actor); 1950s–2025 (poet)

James Lloydovich Patterson (Russian: Джеймс Ллойдович Паттерсон, romanized: Dzheyms Lloydovich Patterson, [ˈd͡ʑɛjms ˈlojdɐvʲɪt͡ɕ ˈpatʲɪrsən]; 17 July 1933 – 22 May 2025) was a Russian-American writer, naval officer, and child actor. Born in Russia, he was of African American and Russian descent.

== Life and career ==
James Lloydovich Patterson was born in Moscow on 17 July 1933, the eldest of three sons born to an African American immigrant to the Soviet Union and his Russian wife. Having traveled to the USSR with Langston Hughes and others in 1932 to participate in Black and White, a Soviet film highlighting the effects of racism in the United States, James Patterson's father Lloyd Walton Patterson, just 22, decided to remain permanently after meeting and falling in love with James' mother, the artist-designer Vera Ippolitovna Aralova.

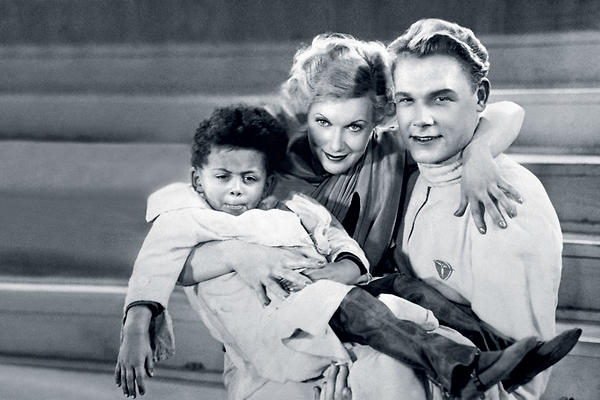
James Patterson, Lyubov Orlova and Sergei Stolyarov (from Circus)

Patterson appeared in the Soviet cinema as a toddler in the 1936 hit Soviet film Circus – where, parallel to his own life, he played the role of the dark-skinned child of an interracial couple. It was his only film appearance.

Following Nazi Germany's attack on the Soviet Union, James, his brothers, his grandmother and his mother were evacuated to Sverdlovsk, while his father, who had obtained a position with Soviet radio as a presenter for English-speaking listeners abroad, remained on the job in Moscow. He was transferred to Komsomolsk-on-Amur where he died in 1942 from the serious wounds he suffered in the bombing of the radio station in Moscow.

James was a member of the Komsomol and graduated from the Riga Nakhimov Naval School, a prestigious military academy for boys of high-school age, in 1951. Lauded as a model cadet, he proceeded to receive further training as a submariner in Leningrad. Commissioned as an officer in the Soviet Navy, Patterson began serving with the Black Sea Fleet in 1955.

By the 1960s, Patterson's professional ambitions had turned to writing. Still serving in the navy, he published his literary debut, the poetry collection Russia. Africa in 1963. Leaving the Soviet Navy, Patterson graduated from the Maxim Gorky Literature Institute in 1964, drawing inspiration from subjects as diverse as the sea, the beginning of the Space Age, and the racial tension around the time of the desegregation efforts of the Civil Rights Movement. Having authored a number of works by the late 1960s, he was admitted as a member of the USSR Union of Writers in 1967.

The sweeping political and economic changes during the breakdown of the Soviet Union were also accompanied by profound difficulties for the new Russian society; a frequent visitor to his father's homeland, James Patterson and his mother immigrated to the United States from the Russian Federation in the 1990s. Following the death of his mother in 2001, Patterson remained in the United States. He lived a quiet life in Washington, D.C. The English translation of his 1964 book Chronicle of the Left Hand, was published in 2022 by New Academia Press.

Patterson died on 22 May 2025, at the age of 91.

== Selected works ==
- Россия. Африка (Russia. Africa, poems, 1963)
- Хроника левой руки: Новеллы. М., 1964 (Chronicles of the Left Hand: Novellas, 1964)
- Рождение ливня (Birth of the Rain, poems, 1973)
- Взаимодействие (Interaction, poems, 1978)
- Зимние ласточки (Winter Swallows, poems, 1980)
- Красная лилия (The Red Lily, poems, 1984)
