= Kasyan Goleizovsky =

Russian choreographer and dancer

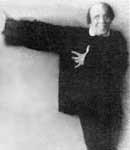
- Born: 5 March 1892; Moscow, Russian Empire
- Died: 4 May 1970 (aged 78); Moscow, Soviet Union
- Occupations: Ballet dancer, choreographer

Kasyan Yaroslavich Goleizovsky (5 March 1892 – 4 May 1970) was a Russian choreographer and dancer. He was a pioneer in the Moscow avant-garde ballet scene in the 1920s. His innovative and acrobatic routines heavily influenced artists like George Balanchine.

== Biography ==
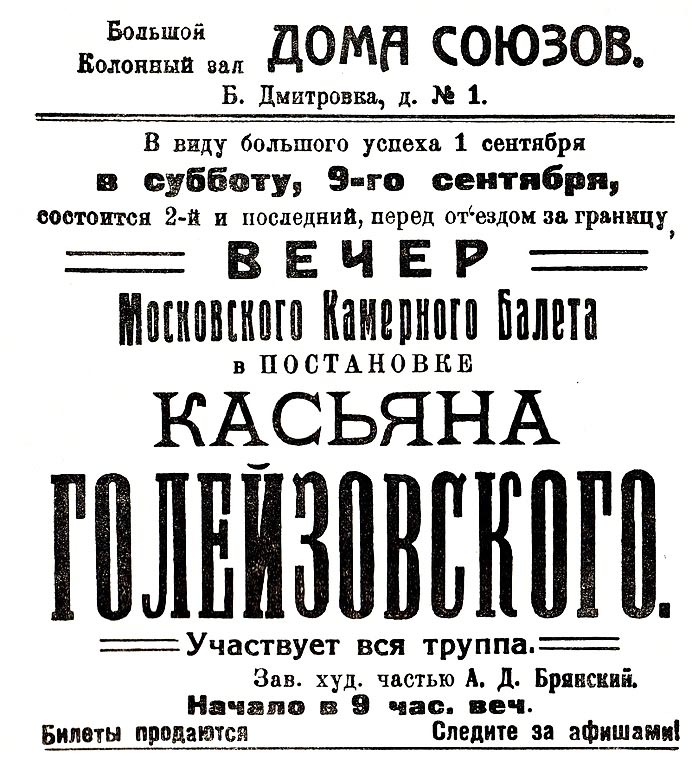
Playbill of concert of early 20th century - Kasian Goleyzovski

His father was an opera soloist in Moscow, and his mother was a dancer. He studied first in Moscow and from 1902 in St. Petersburg. In 1906, he entered the Maryinsky Theater school and studied with Michel Fokine. He graduated from the Imperial Ballet Academy in 1909. Following a short stint with the Marykinsky troupe, he joined Moscow's Bolshoi Theater School, remaining there until 1918. While with the Bolshoi, he studied ballet production with Alexander Gorsky.

Unhappy with the conservatism of Moscow's ballet scene, he soon sought alternative venues for his creative ideas. Working in Moscow's cabarets and with impresarios such as Vsevolod Meyerhold, he created dark and sultry scenarios highly sexual in character. In 1916, he founded his own studio called The Quest and soon found a devoted audience entranced by his provocative ideas. His experiments inspired George Balanchine to establish his own troupe in 1922, the Young Ballet.

In 1922, he became the impresario of his own company, the Moscow Chamber Ballet, for which he devised some of his most popular dances, including Faun set to Claude Debussy's music and Salome, with music from Richard Strauss's opera. His most popular early work is Joseph the Handsome (1925), music by Sergei Vasilenko, written for the Bolshoi's Experimental Theater. Its content angered conservatives and it was quickly removed from the repertoire. Later works for the Bolshoi that also met with conservative objection include Lola (1925; music by Vasilenko) and The Whirlwind (1927).

In the late 1920s, the government became more focused on evaluating sexuality in art through the lens of socialist morality. With increased censorship of his ballets, from the 1930s he focused on works for the Moscow music hall. As many Russian artists had done in the period following the Russian Revolution, especially with Joseph Stalin's call for works revolutionary in form and socialist in content, Goleizovsky turned to the study of Russian folklore. He now choreographed works for agitprop theatre, folk dances, and sports festivals. During World War II he choreographed folk dances for the Song and Dance Ensemble of the Ministry of the Interior. He returned to the ballet stage in the 1960s with works inspired by his interests in folklore.

== Publications ==
- 1964: "Образы русской народной хореографии". Москва
