= Circus (1936 film) =

1936 film by Grigori Aleksandrov

- Film poster
- Directed by: Grigori Aleksandrov; Isidor Simkov
- Written by: Grigori Aleksandrov
- Starring: Lyubov Orlova; Vladimir Volodin; Sergei Stolyarov; Pavel Massalsky; James Patterson
- Cinematography: Vladimir Nilsky; Boris Petrov
- Music by: Isaak Dunayevsky
- Production company: Mosfilm
- Release date: 23 May 1936
- Running time: 94 minutes
- Country: Soviet Union
- Language: Russian

Circus (Russian: Цирк, romanized: Tsirk) is a 1936 Soviet melodramatic comedy musical film. It was directed by Grigori Aleksandrov and Isidor Simkov at the Mosfilm studios. In his own words, it was conceived as "an eccentric comedy... a real side splitter."

Starring Lyubov Orlova (Aleksandrov's wife), a prominent figure of Soviet cinema and a singer, the film contains several songs which became Soviet classics. One of which is the "Song of the Motherland" (Широка страна моя родная, Shiroka strana moya rodnaya). ISWC code for film music: T-926.406.620-8.

The film was based on a comedy written by Ilf and Petrov and Valentin Kataev and performed by Moscow music hall, Under the Circus Dome (Под куполом цирка), which was seen and liked by Aleksandrov. They made the play into the plot, but during the initial film shooting they went to America. Upon return, they disliked the director's interpretation, and after a conflict they abandoned the work, forbade the mention of their names in the credits, and further work on the plot was continued by Isaac Babel.

== Plot ==
Circus (1936)

Marion Dixon, a popular white American circus artist, is forced to flee for her life with her black baby to escape a lynch mob in a rural American town. The fate of the black father of her child is not mentioned, but it is heavily implied that he was lynched. Dixon is taken under the wing of Franz von Kneishitz, a sinister German theatrical agent. Kneishitz blackmails Dixon into becoming his lover while exploiting her.

Dixon is only kept alive by her love for her son Jimmy, and when she plays in Moscow as a guest performer, she is portrayed as spiritually broken. At the Moscow circus, the circus director Ludvig hires the Arctic explorer Ivan Petrovich Martynov to design a new circus act to top Dixon's "Trip to the Moon" act. Ludvig's fiery daughter Rayechka has a tempestuous relationship with her boyfriend Skameikin. Despite his mission to design an act better than her act, Martynov and Dixon fall in love, which attracts Kneishitz's rage and he beats Dixon quite savagely with his whip.

Dixon wants to stay in Moscow with Martynov, saying she has found happiness again. Kneishitz diverts a love letter from Dixon meant for Martynov to Skameikin, which throws the circus into romantic chaos as Rayechka is furious with Skameikin while Martynov is heartbroken. To escape Rayechka, Skameikin accidentally runs into a lion cage and has to calm the lions with a bouquet of flowers. When Martynov does not respond to her love letter, Dixon nearly leaves Moscow with Kneishitz. By this time, Rayechka has learned the truth and she helps Dixon escape Kneishitz. Martynov and Dixon are late to the circus, forcing Ludvig to perform the top act of 1903, the chudo tekhniki ("miracle of technology"), to amuse the impatient audience. Finally, Martynov and Dixon arrive and perform their "Trip to the Stratosphere" act together.

Kneishitz interrupts the act to tell Dixon to come with him or else he will reveal her secret. When she refuses, Kneishitz delivers a Hitler-like rant revealing Dixon has a black son called Jimmy, only for the audience to laugh at him. Ludvig tells Kneishitz that the peoples of the Soviet Union do not share his concern about racial purity or race at all. Dixon's black son is embraced by friendly Soviet people. Kneishitz tries to seize Jimmy, but the audience unites to save him. Finally, a group of burly Red Army soldiers in the audience block Kneishitz, who cowers in fear and leaves. The movie climaxes with a lullaby being sung to the baby by representatives of various Soviet ethnicities taking turns. The lyrics of the lullaby to Jimmy are sung in Russian, Ukrainian, Yiddish, Uzbek, and Georgian. One of the members of the audience is a black American man dressed in a Soviet naval officer's uniform with a white Russian wife, which was meant to show that there is no racism in the Soviet Union. The lyrics of The International Lullaby declare: "Son prikhodit na porog/Krepko, krepko spi ty/Sto putei, sto dorog/Dlia tebia otkryty" ("Sleep comes to your doorstep/Sleep very, very soundly/A hundred paths, a hundred doorways/Are open to you"). Dixon and Martynov declare their love for one another while Rayechka and Skameikin become engaged. The film ends with Rayechka and Dixon marching together in the annual May Day parade under banners depicting the faces of Lenin and Stalin.

== Cast ==
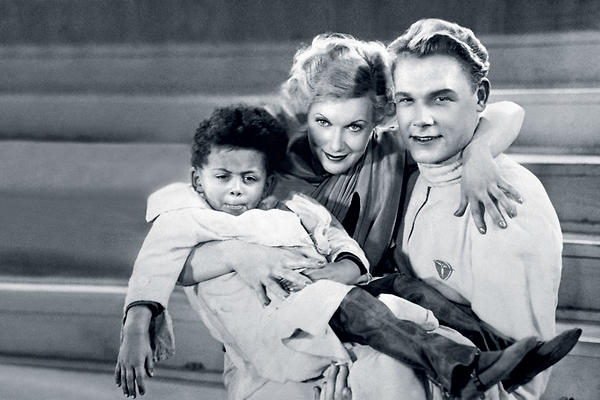
James Patterson, Lyubov Orlova, and Sergei Stolyarov

- Lyubov Orlova as Marion Dixon, American actress and circus artist. Her name is a tribute to the actress Marlene Dietrich
- James Patterson as Jimmy, Marion's baby
- Sergei Stolyarov as Ivan Petrovich Martynov, Soviet performance director
- Pavel Massalsky as Franz von Kneisсhitz, corrupt theatrical agent
- Vladimir Volodin as Ludvig Osipovich, Soviet circus director
- Yevgeniya Melnikova as Rayechka, the director's daughter
- Aleksandr Komissarov as Skameikin
- Nikolai Otto as Charlie Chaplin
- Coretti Arle-Titz as Jimmy's nanny
- Solomon Mikhoels as Lullaby singer

== Analysis ==
The American scholar Rimgaila Salys noted the film Circus had a rather heavy-handed message about the evils of racism, which are associated with the West in the film, versus Soviet society, which is portrayed as free of racism. The film's message that Jimmy will have a bright future in the Soviet Union as he grows up despite being black stands in contrast to the racism that the film depicts as being the norm in the United States and Germany. The scene where Dixon, Martynov, and Jimmy pose together as a blended family was often reproduced in the Soviet Union as a symbol of racial tolerance. Likewise, the character of Charlie Chaplin in the film is a bullied servant to Kneschtiz, who delights in humiliating him. Aleksandrov was friend of the real Chaplin, who often fought with Hollywood studios over the contents of his films, and Chaplin as portrayed in Circus was intended as a metaphor for the real Chaplin, namely as a "humiliated genius forced to serve the almighty dollar".

Salys wrote that the film's had a strong message about gender roles as Dixon comes to embrace the role of a wife and a mother at the film's conclusion as well accepting the demands of the Soviet state upon her as the price of happiness. Salys noted that in her "Trip to the Moon" act, Dixon performed a lengthy masturbatory dance on atop of the phallic cannon and as she falls downwards after being shot out of the cannon, is captured by the ropes that Kneschtiz has placed under the circus tent, symbolizing her status as a sort of sex slave to Kneschtiz. By contrast, when Dixon performs the "Trip to the Stratosphere" act, she is presented as Martynov's equal as the two perform the act together wearing unisex uniforms.

Despite the ostensible egalitarian message of the film, Circus marked in many ways a return to traditional Russian gender roles. Martynov was played by the tall, muscular, and blond actor Stolyarov whose appearance matched the popular stereotype of a bogatyr (the larger-than-life knight hero of medieval Russian poems known as byliny). Likewise, the character of Martynov displayed all the values typically associated with a bogatyr such being romantic, but laconic; always willing to defend the weak; a stoic acceptance of pain; and possessing super-human heroism and strength. Stolyarov having successfully played a character who matched the bogatry archetype in Circus graduated up to playing actual bogatyri in subsequent films. Salys wrote that the appearance of the bogatyr archetype as the ideal Russian man in Soviet films starting in the 1930s reflected a certain reversion to the traditional patriarchal Russian values during the Stalinist era.

Likewise, the character of Marion is presented as highly sexualized at the beginning of the film, which associates her with "western decadence", and her appearance becomes increasingly chaste as she assimilates into the puritanical Soviet society as the film goes along. Marion's dress as she performs the Flight to the Moon act emphasizes her sexuality as she wore a tight, low-cut bodice with stars placed where her nipples are, which was meant show that she was an exploited woman in the West, just merely a sex object for rich and powerful men such as Kneschtiz. The scene where Marion throws her expensive Western dresses at Kneschtiz as she says that "Marion you knew is no more!" marked a key turning point in her character's development as she thereafter dresses in a more Soviet style. Marion's more conservative Soviet clothing was meant to show that she was no longer an exploited woman. Marion is portrayed as the typical foreigner in Soviet films as she is naïve, romantic, generous, kind, and utterly passive as it is the Soviet characters who take the initiative in rescuing her from the cruel clutches of Kneschtiz. Unlike films in the 1920s, which featured strong feminist heroines, Marion is very much a "damsel in distress" who needs Martynov to save her. The film ends with Marion marching alongside Martynov-whom she is planning to marry-in the May Day parade with both dressed in the same white uniforms, which symbolized her assimilation into Soviet society and her acceptance of its values as her own.

Soviet censors disapproved of any signs of sexuality, and rather surprisingly allowed the circus scenes where young women dance around and longingly touch the phallic cannons, though those scenes were subsequently censored. Despite the efforts of the censors, Aleksandrov was able to insert the scene where Martynov and Dixon fly together in their Trip to the Stratosphere act with ecstatic expressions on their faces, which serves as a metaphor for high of an orgasm.

== Reception and other facts ==
- The movie was the most commercially successful Soviet film. Two weeks after the release, it was viewed by 1 million people in Moscow alone
- In Russia, Solomon Mikhoels's murder in 1948 by the order of Stalin was perceived as a rejection of movie's message about the danger of chauvinism and anti-Semitism. American researcher Herbert Eagle said: "The scene in the Circus is intended to show that the Soviet people are devoid of racial prejudices. Of course, it was an attack against America and propaganda, but on the other hand, Aleksandrov probably sincerely called for reconciliation, for harmony, hoping that in these terrible times he would awaken conscience in the audience with the means available to him."
- In early 1953, the verses from the lullaby, sung in Yiddish (which were performed by Solomon Mikhoels) were removed. After Stalin's death the verses were restored
- The well known animal trainer Boris Eder substituted for Aleksandr Komissarov in Skameikin's flower fight with the lions
- The "Flight to the Moon" stunt coordinated and performed by three Kharkiv inventors where the extreme sports athlete Vera Buslaeva substituted for Lyubov Orlova for the cameras
- The movie has an in-joke about Mikhail Lermontov's death at the hands of Nikolai Martynov, at that time in the 1930s it was officially revised as a planned political murder ordered by the secret police
- The movie with an American Catholic protagonist was released one month before the 1936 anti-abortion law. Just after that, America and Americans disappeared from Soviet cinema. Lyubov Orlova had to participate in the anti-abortion law promotion company: "I myself want a child, and I will certainly have one. And it is natural. Life is getting more and more joyful and more fun. The future is even more wonderful. Why not give birth?". In 1941, she adopted Douglas (b. 19 May 1925), Grigori Aleksandrov's son by his first marriage to actress Olga Ivanova (she died during childbirth in June 1941, being married to a famous actor Boris Tenin). He was named after Douglas Fairbanks, he and Mary Pickford visited the Bolshevik state back then and were admired by Grigori and Olga. In 1952, Douglas Aleksandrov was arrested by the MVD on false treason claims and, at 26 in a prison, had suffered his first heart attack before being forcefully renamed to 'Vasilii'. The MVD unsuccessfully wanted him to testify about his father being an American spy. He was released shortly after Stalin's death in 1953

== See also ==
- List of musical films
