= Rimgaila Salys =

Russian literature researcher

Rimgaila "Rima" Salys is professor emerita of Russian Program at the University of Colorado Boulder and an expert in 20th century Russian literature, film, and culture. Her research interests include Soviet and post-Soviet cinema, 20th century Russian art and culture, theory and praxis of literary modernism, and Soviet cinematic musical.

Of note is her research in the history of the Patterson family of black expatriates in the Soviet Union, which included James Patterson, who played the black baby boy in the famous soviet musical Circus.

She graduated from the University of Pennsylvania and Harvard University in Slavic Languages and Literatures.

From 1994 to 2014 she taught at the University of Colorado Boulder, where she served as Associate Chair for Russian and Interim Chair for Germanic and Slavic Languages and Literatures.

== Books ==
- 1999: Leonid Pasternak: The Russian Years (1875–1921), 2 vols, Oxford University Press
- 2009: The Musical Comedy Films of Grigorii Aleksandrov: Laughing Matters, University of Chicago Press books
  - The book discusses films Jolly Fellows, Circus, Volga-Volga, and Tanya. "Salys explores how Aleksandrov’s cinema preserved the paradigms of the American musical, including its comedic tradition, using both to inscribe the foundation myths of the Stalin era in the national consciousness."
- 1999: (editor & contributor) Yuri Olesha. Envy. A Critical Companion
- 2005: (editor & contributor) Tightrope Walking: The Memoirs of Josephine Pasternak
- 2013: (editor & contributor) The Russian Cinema Reader, 2 vols.
- 2015 (editor & contributor) The Contemporary Russian Cinema Reader : 2005–2016, ISBN 161811963X
