= Mosconcert =

Oldest cultural organization in Moscow

- Abbreviation: ГБУК Москонцерт
- Founded: 1931
- Headquarters: Moscow, Russia
- Region served: Moscow
- Secretary General: Ilya Bachurin
- Website: https://mosconcert.moscow

Mosconcert is the oldest cultural organization in Moscow. Its full name is "Mosconcert, state budgetary institution of culture of Moscow" (ГБУК города Москвы «Москонцерт»)

== History ==
At 25 January 1931, in Soviet Union, the National Association of Musical, Variety, and Circus Enterprises was formed. Mosconcert is the successor of it.

During the years of the Great Patriotic War, the concert brigades of "Mosconcert" from masters of all genres performed at the forefront at the front, in the rear, in hospitals. Among the artists were the legendary masters of the Soviet stage: Lidia Ruslanova, Leonid Utyosov, Boris Brunov, Klavdiya Shulzhenko, Nikolai Smirnov-Sokolsky, Maya Kristalinskaya, Viktor Besedin, Gennady Belov, Valery Kovtun and many others.

Some contemporary artists had collaborated with Mosconcert at various times: Zemlyane, Time Machine, Alla Pugacheva, Valentina Tolkunova, Zhanna Bichevskaya, Iosif Kobzon, Klara Novikova, Efim Shifrin, Nikolai Sokolov, Vladimir Baykov, Tatiana Sorokina. Mosconcert organizes performances, ballets, shows and concerts in Moscow, and broadcasts concerts online.

In 2019, Ilya Bachurin was appointed the Director General of Mosconcert.

== Structure ==
The structural divisions of Mosconcert are:

- Moscow Concert Philharmonic Association
- Production Center
- Concert association for work with children and Youth
- Moscow Choral Theater under the direction of Boris Pevsner
- Moscow State Ballet Theater of Classical Choreography "LA CLASSIQUE"
- MINIATURE THEATER under the direction of Yevgeny Petrosyan
- Dmitri Pokrovsky Ensemble
- Moscow Theater of Miniatures under the direction of Mikhail Zhvanetsky
- Children's music and Drama Theater "A-Ya"
- Moscow music hall
- Moscow State Variety Theater»

== Concert halls ==
Mosconcert holds events at its concert venues:

- «Mosconcert on Pushechnaya», which has a Hall of Mirrors, a Ballroom, a Theater hall and a Blue living room. Address: Moscow, Pushechnaya str., 4, p. 2.
- Mosconcert Hall Concert Hall. Address: Moscow, ul. Kalanchevskaya, 33
- «Mosconcert Art Salon». Address: Moscow, Leningradsky ave., 30, p. 2
- Children's music and drama Theater "A-Ya". Address: Moscow, Petrovsky lane, 5, p. 9
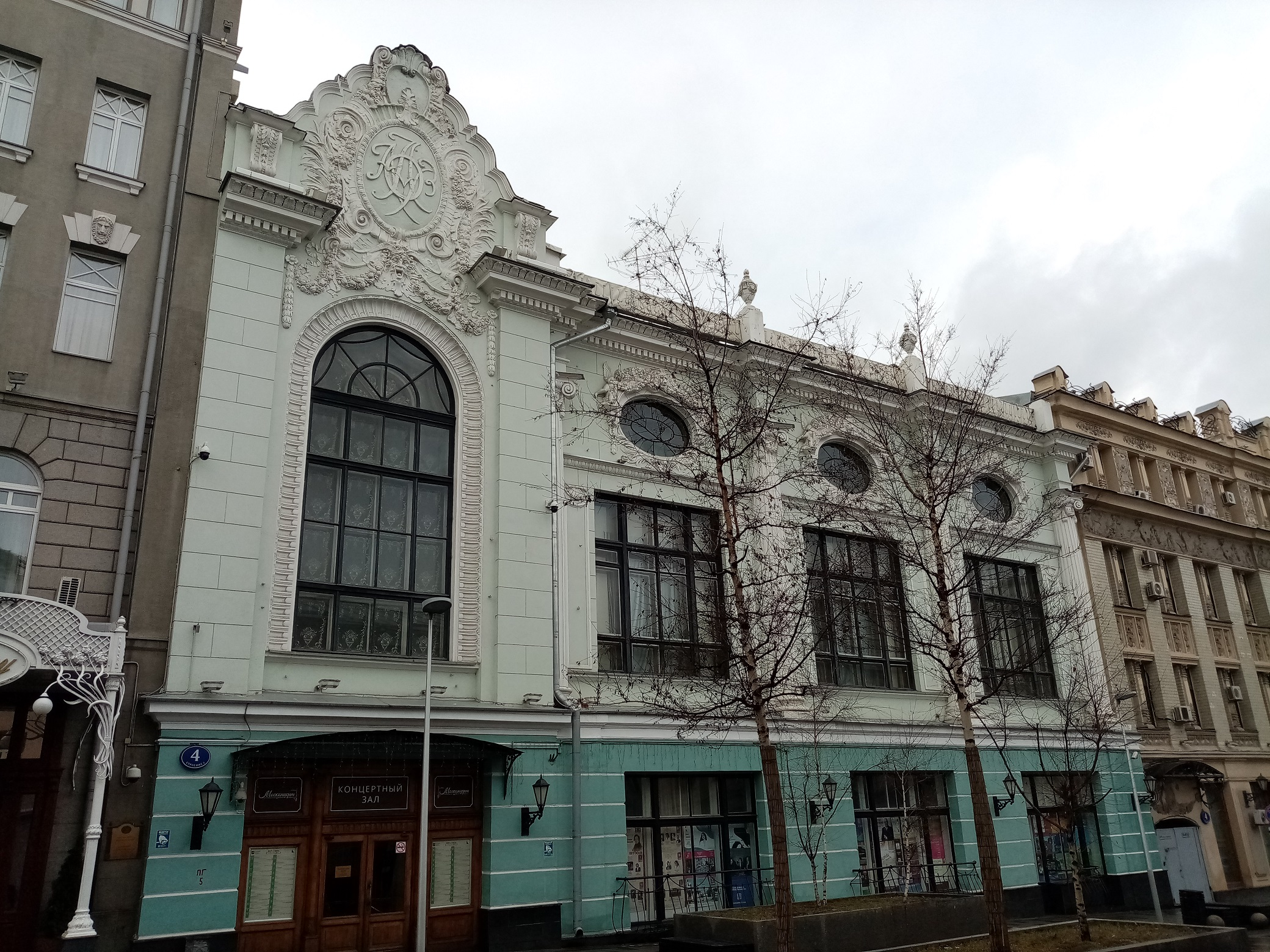
Mosconcert on Pushechnaya Street

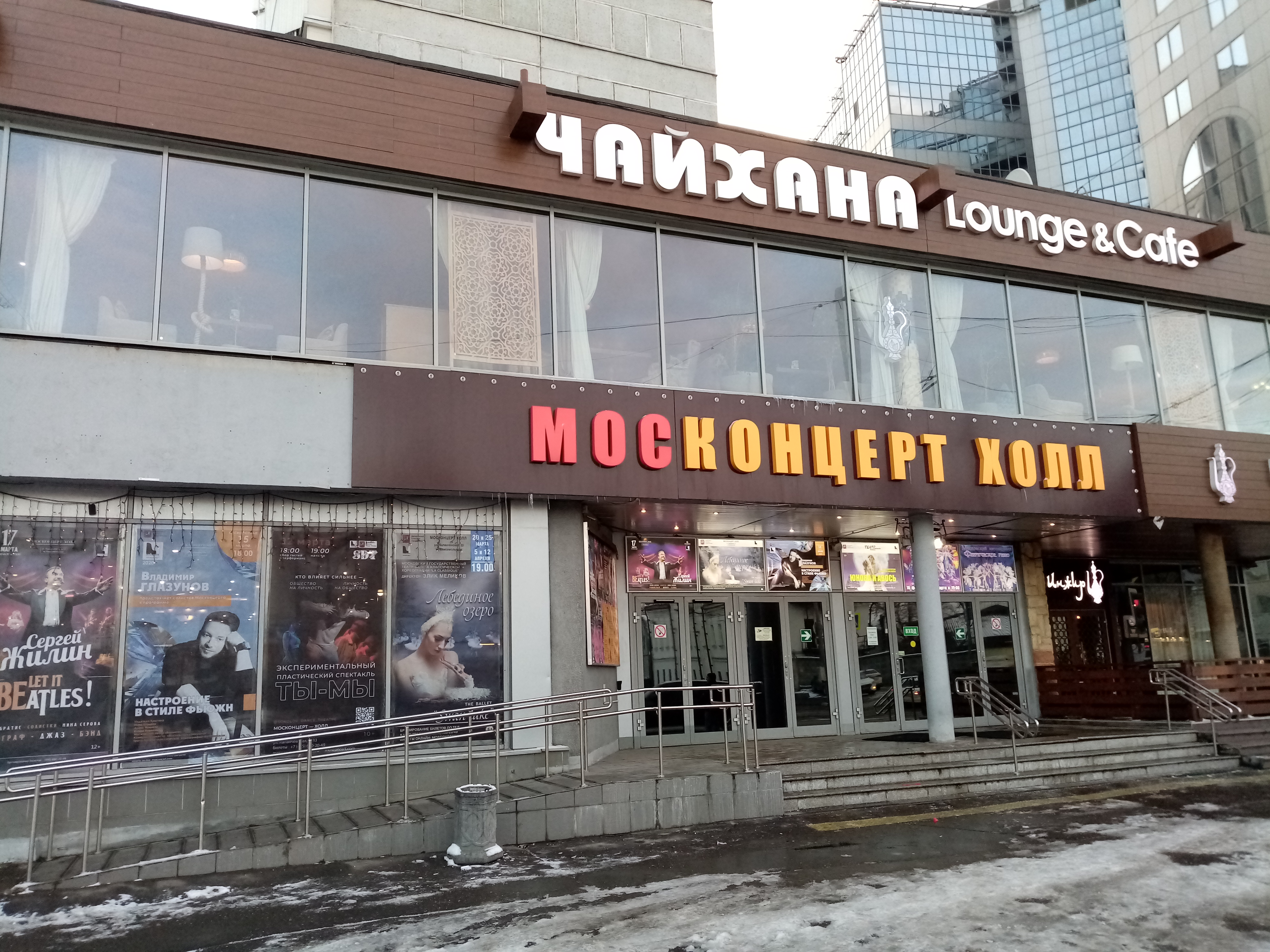
Mosconcert Hall

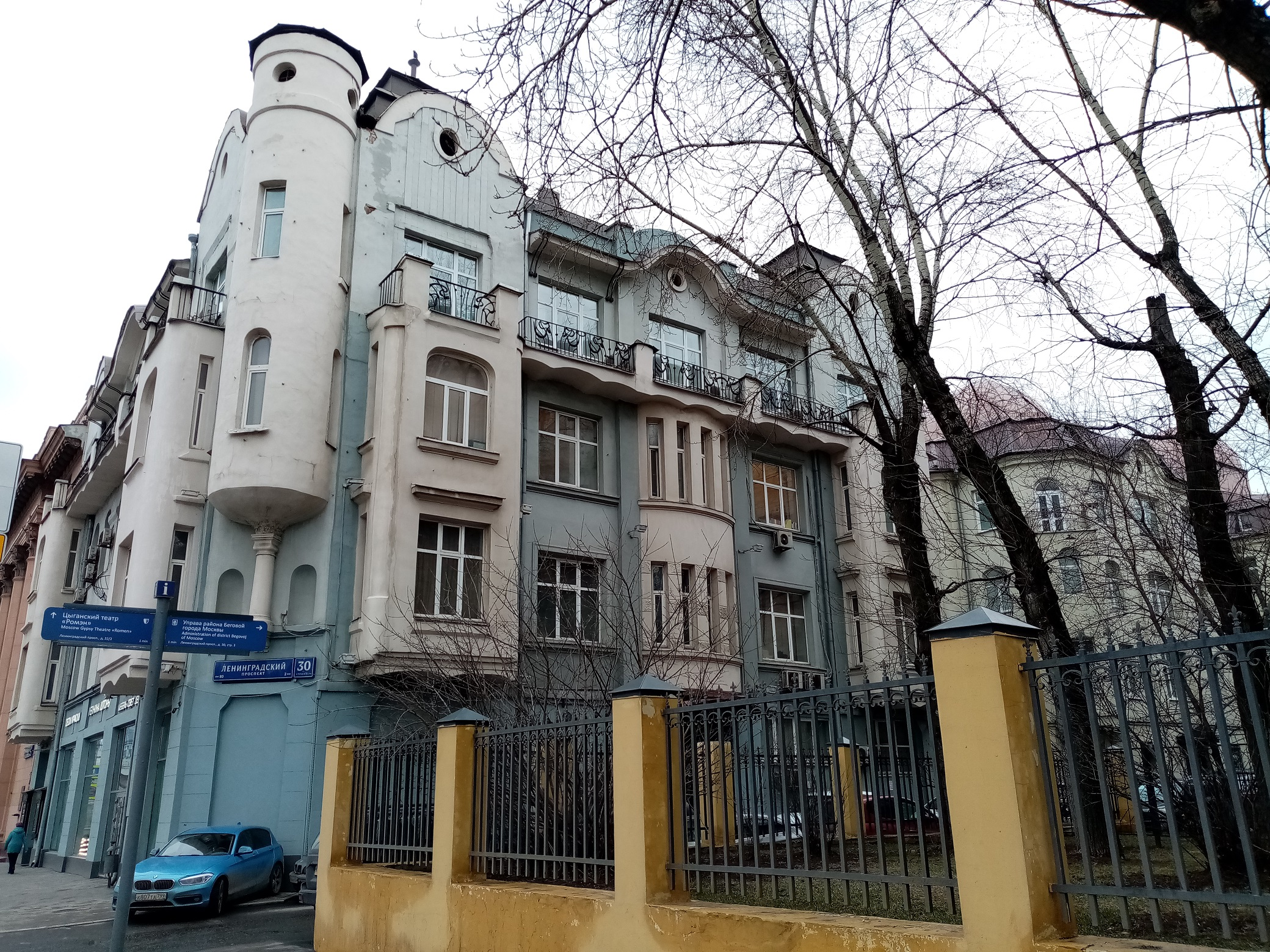
Mosconcert Art Salon

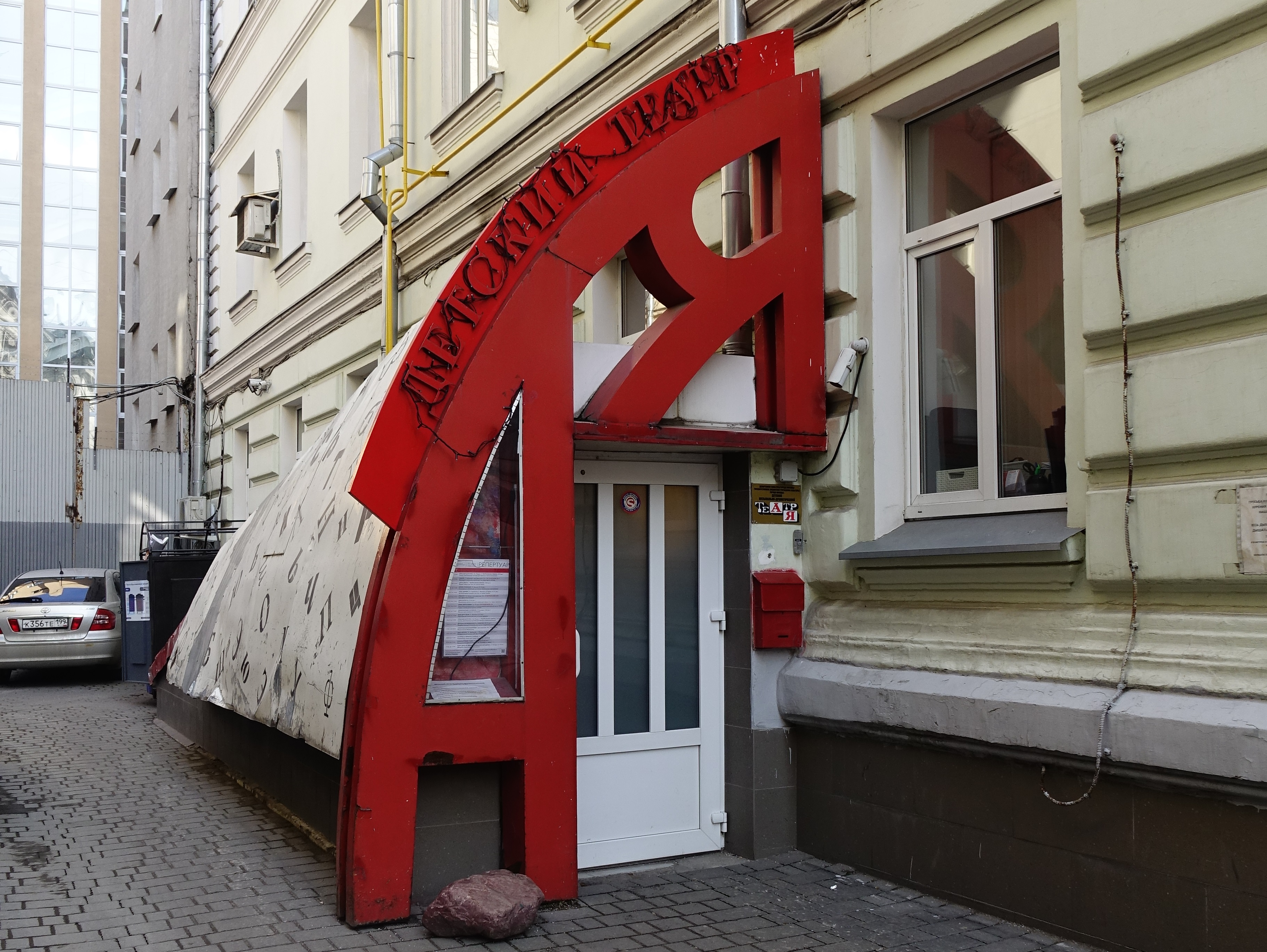
Children's Music and Drama Theater "A-Ya"
