= August Eighth =

- Theatrical release poster
- Directed by: Dzhanik Fayziev
- Screenplay by: Michael Alan Lerner
- Story by: Dzhanik Fayziev
- Produced by: Ilya Bachurin; Dzhanik Fayziev; Fyodor Bondarchuk
- Starring: Svetlana Ivanova; Maksim Matveyev; Artyom Fadeev; Aleksei Guskov; Aleksandr Oleshko; Egor Beroev
- Cinematography: Sergei Trofimov
- Edited by: Dennis Virkler
- Music by: Ruslan Muratov
- Production companies: Glavkino; Dago Productions; Bonanza Studio
- Distributed by: 20th Century Fox CIS
- Release date: 22 February 2012 (Russia)
- Running time: 132 min
- Country: Russia
- Languages: Russian; Ossetian; Georgian
- Budget: 19 Million USD
- Box office: 12.5 Million USD

August Eighth (Russian: «Август. Восьмого», translit. Avgust. Vosʹmogo) is a 2012 Russian propaganda war film about the 2008 August War. It was produced and directed by Dzhanik Fayziev.

== Background ==
The film tells the story of a young single mother who must make her way to South Ossetia in order to reunite with her son whom she had sent away before the war. The story of the war is shown through two different point of view. One is the mother's and the other is the son's, who sees it in terms of a science fiction story about fighting robots.

In comparison to Olympus Inferno and 5 Days of War, August Eighth was not marketed as a "search for the truth" film. However, it was recognized as a socially important project, and was filmed at the expense of the Russian State Fund for Social and Economic Support of National Cinematography.

Twentieth Century Fox C.I.S., a Russian distributor of 20th Century Fox distributed the film. The Russian premiere took place on 21 February 2012. It premiered on television on 4 November 2012 on Channel One.

== Plot ==
Kseniya, a 23-year-old pastry chef from Moscow, is trying to move on from her failed marriage and focus on her new relationship with Yegor, a young banker. Her seven-year-old son Artyom struggles with his parents’ separation, retreating into a vivid fantasy world where he imagines himself as a superhero called Kosmoboy. In his imagination, Kosmoboy fights alongside a towering robot ally named Edger Beroev against the monstrous villain Mrakovlast (“Darklord”), a symbolic reflection of Artyom’s emotional fears.

On August 5, 2008, Kseniya receives a call from her ex-husband Zaur, an Ossetian peacekeeper serving with the Russian Armed Forces in South Ossetia. Zaur asks Kseniya to send Artyom to visit his parents in Sidamonta, a quiet village near the Georgia–South Ossetia border. Zaur assures her that Artyom will be completely safe. At the same time, two Russian Spetsnaz reconnaissance soldiers Seryoza and Lyokha are observing heavy Georgian troops and armor movements near the Dariali Gorge, raising concerns about an imminent conflict.

Although hesitant, Kseniya agrees to send her son to South Ossetia so she can take a short vacation to Sochi with Yegor, who is uninterested in spending time with the boy. Kseniya makes Zaur promise that he will return Artyom to Moscow immediately if she asks.

Two days later, on August 7, 2008, Kseniya learns from the news that tensions in South Ossetia have erupted into open fighting. Panicking, she calls Zaur and demands that he have Artyom flown back home. Zaur insists their son is safe and happily staying with his grandparents. Distraught, Kseniya confronts Yegor at his bank, but he refuses to get involved in her “family drama”. Their argument becomes public and humiliating for him, ending their relationship.

Determined to rescue her son herself, Kseniya flies to Vladikavkaz, then boards a civilian bus through the Roki Tunnel into South Ossetia. Midway through the mountain pass, the bus is struck by an anti-tank missile launched by unknown attackers, tearing it in half and sending survivors scrambling for their lives. A Russian Army reconnaissance unit led by Lyokha arrives in two GAZ Tigr armored vehicles and rescues Kseniya and the remaining passengers. Lyokha escorts her to Tskhinvali, the capital of South Ossetia, where that night the Battle of Tskhinvali begins as Georgian BM-21 Grad rockets and artilleries devastate the city center. Amid chaos and shelling, Kseniya flees with local civilians under the protection of a South Ossetian militia leader, Kazbek Nikolaevich.

They reach the Dzau refugee camp. Along the route, Kseniya manages to call Zaur, who is driving back to Sidamonta to evacuate his parents and Artyom toward the Russian peacekeepers’ base. They agree to meet in Dzau, but before Zaur can leave, a Georgian T-72 tank obliterates the family. Zaur and his parents are killed instantly, while Artyom, injured and traumatized, hides inside the ruins. When Kseniya phones his mobile, the boy mutters in delirium: “Mrakovlast was here… Mrakovlast killed everyone…” Realizing what happened, Kseniya resolves to reach him alone.

She joins a Russian military convoy led by Captain Ilya, a friend of Zaur, along with several war correspondents. En route, the convoy is ambushed by Georgian soldiers after a radio malfunction prevents Lyokha’s team from warning them. Most of the Russian troops, including Ilya, are killed. Kseniya narrowly survives when Lyokha’s reconnaissance unit arrives again and pulls her to safety. He brings her to his field base near Sidamonta, the same area where Artyom is hiding.

The next day, Lyokha and his men set out in two GAZ Tigrs to evacuate trapped civilians and peacekeepers. They are attacked by a Georgian T-72 tank but escape thanks to Lyokha’s precise timing during the tank’s 6-second reload cycle. With the Russian lines under pressure, Lyokha and his team remains behind to cover evacuations, leaving Kseniya to continue alone.

Stealing a Georgian army's Land Rover Defender, Kseniya drives toward the ruins of Zaur’s house. There she finds Artyom, weak and unable to walk. While attempting to reach Russian positions, they are spotted and fired upon by Georgian troops and an Otokar Cobra armored car, supported by the same T-72. Remembering Lyokha’s instructions about the T-72’s reload interval, Kseniya maneuvers during the 6-second window, causing the Georgian tank’s shell to miss and destroy its own pursuing vehicle instead. As she speeds through a staging area filled with Georgian soldiers and heavy equipments, Russian Air Force Su-25 ground-attack jets launch an ground attack run, annihilating the staging enemies and clearing a path for her escape.

While stopping to give first aid to Artyom, Kseniya is confronted by a lone Georgian soldier. Instead of killing them, he takes pity and drives them toward Russian lines. Finally, Kseniya climbs a hill with Artyom in her arms as Russian T-72 tanks and troops approach. The lead tank halts before them, and its commander asks if she speaks Russian. When she nods, he orders her to move aside, allowing their advance to continue. Kseniya and Artyom keep walking through the smoke-filled battlefield.

Later, Artyom awakens in a field hospital, recovering from his injuries. Kseniya gently tells him about Zaur’s death. In the closing scene, when they are preparing to board an Mi-17 evacuation helicopter, Lyokha visits them, reporting that Russian forces have captured the Georgian city of Gori, effectively ending the war. Kseniya and Artyom are flown back to Russia, with Lyokha promised to meet them again in the future.

The final scene shows the cordless landline phone on the table in Kseniya's house at Moscow ringing, with Yegor calling three times but no one answers and leaving a message, and surprisingly, Lyokha finally calls and the film ends.

== Cast ==
- Svetlana Ivanova as Kseniya
- Maksim Matveyev as Lyokha
- Sergey Nazarov as Seryoza
- Konstantin Samoukov as Grishka
- Aleksey Guskov as Kazbek Nikolaevich
- Egor Beroev as Zaur and Kind Robot
- Alexander Oleshko as Yegor
- Artyom Fadeev as Artyom
- Khasan Baroyev as Captain Ilya (based on Denis Vetchinov)
- Vladimir Vdovichenkov as President of Russia (based on the real-life Russian President at that time, Dmitry Medvedev)
- Sergey Gazarov as Kirill Ivanovich, advisor to the President
- Anna Legchilova as Kseniya's mother
- Aleksei Guskov as Kazbek Nikolaevich
- Gosha Kutsenko as himself
- Estelle Raskin as foreign journalist
- Mitya Labush as journalist, killed in an armored personnel carrier
- Lidiya Velezheva as Aza
- Tyeimuraz Taniya as controller in bus on Tskhinvali
- Vladimir Zaitsev as Russian Defense Minister
- Alexander Petrov as Yashka, tank commander
- Valeryi Kudashkin as Chairman of the FSB
- Tamara Gamgiya as Zaur's mother
- Lyeonid Khishba as Zaur's father
- Aleksandr Karamnov as Romanov
- Aleksandr Khoshabaev as unnamed Georgian soldier
- Kirill Pletnyov as tank driver
- Yekaterina Avdyeeva as Kosmoboy
- Dzhanik Fayziev as Mrakovlast

== Production ==
The central plot is based on two true stories: a man dragged his ex-girlfriend from South Ossetia in August 2008; and the second on the producer's friend's son who suffered dissociation. The film was shot from March to August 2011. Most of the scenes of South Ossetia were shot in Abkhazia and North Ossetia–Alania. Most extras were Abkhazians, but the characters, who speak in Ossetian, were played or were dubbed by North Ossetian actors. The official trailer was created in Trailerhouse by Sundown Entertainment.

== Film distribution ==
The premiere of the film took place in Moscow on 17 February 2012 at the cinema Pushkinski. The film was released across Russia on 21 February 2012. The premiere was planned for Defender of the Fatherland Day and so the film had much competition. In the first week of distribution the film was in the lead at the box office and collected more than 140,000,000 rubles (about 5,000,000 dollars) for the first weekend. In total, August Eighth netted about 10,000,000 dollars in Russian theaters, much less than the gross of Faiziyev's previous film, Turkish Gambit. The début of the film with English subtitles took place in Australia on 1 September 2012 under the title August 8th at the Russian Resurrection Film Festival 2012.

== Home media ==
In Russia, the film was released on DVD on 22 March 2012 and on Blu-ray on 14 June 2012. Neither edition contains any subtitles. A French dub of the movie called War Zone was released on DVD and Blu-ray in France on 7 August 2013.

== See also ==
- Olympus Inferno
- 5 Days of War
