= Moscow music hall =

- Interactive map of Moscow music hall
- Address: 33/12 Kalanchevskaya st. Moscow; Russia
- Coordinates: 55°46′33.658″N 37°38′57.775″E
- Capacity: 500–600
- Type: Cabaret

Construction
- Opened: 1923

Website
- Moscow music hall

The Moscow music hall (Russian: Московский мюзик-холл) is a theater and state cultural institution of Moscow, Russia.

== History ==
The first concert of the Moscow music hall took place on the stage of Aquarium Theater in 1923. The initial name of it was "Circus Music Hall". At that time it was controlled by the Central Department of State Circuses, which was the main reason of huge number of circus acts in the initial programs of the theater. Even though foreign colleagues working in such format were incredibly popular (in London and Paris), the soviet people couldn't get used to it. The first show programs of Moscow music hall consisted mainly from so-called "special" performances (special acts), which had almost no art. Solo artists were performing one by one, showing different acts including tap-dancing, juggling, putting a chicken or even a crocodile to sleep and even using oranges and soft toys instead of musical instruments. Names of celebrities of that time were used in order to attract the audience, as well as numerous posters with names of the foreign artists and performers. Even though Moscow music hall was striving to be a real music hall, it was pretty far from its goal at that time. That’s why the theater received its new name in 1928. It was named as "Exhibition Variety Theater Music Hall". Kasyan Goleizovsky became choreographer of the theater. He founded "30 girls" dancing company and invited David Gutman as art director. There were such famous people as Ilf, Petrov, Mayakovsky, Demyan Bedny among many other authors who were writing for Music Hall. Such popular singers as Utesov, Amurskyi, Gurko, Afonin, Mylich and Grinov were singing on its stage. The theater was developing in the direction of an artificial musical performance, which was meaningful, yet entertaining. It was trying to find balance between the satire theater, operetta, circus and dances. In one season between 1928 and 1929 Moscow music hall managed to present four performances: “The miracle of the XXX century” (it was later moved to Leningrad and presented during the opening ceremony of the music hall under new name "Miracles of the XXI century"), "100 minutes of a journalist", "To the icy place" (music of Isaak Dunayevsky) and "Fallen from the sky". D. Gutman staged three of them. None of the following seasons of Moscow music hall would have the same number of premiers. Performance of "30 English girls" was the most popular (and condemnable). The idea of it was thoroughly described in memoirs and personal works of Natalia Sheremetievskaya. Even though the image of half-naked girls was causing criticism, some people gave clear appreciation:

«Girls show… simply can’t be considered as a demonstration of a semi-naked body” – said a reviewer from "Izvestia" newspaper. “The center of gravity is the uniform repetition of the same movement that looks like a clear and precise mechanical movement of machines. This is some kind of variety physical education.»

Choreographer Goleizovskyi strived to create a real “music hall” dance where women perform gracious and perfectly synchronous movements. His choreography was based not only on elements of free calisthenics and physical education but on choreographic compositions. The stage of Moscow music hall became the base for such artists and performers as K.Shulzhenko, L. Ruslanova, A. Menaker and M. Hrustalev. The theater strived to take the best from the variety art of 20s and 30s, and it was really successful in that. In the year of 1934 new performance named "Under the circus dome" was staged in the theater (Ilf and Petrov and Valentin Kataev). This performance managed to save the theater in the history of Soviet art, because Grigori Aleksandrov filmed "Circus" – movie based on its storyline. However, even such incredible level of fame couldn't save the theater. At that time people were fighting with so-called "bourgeois art" and the variety art was considered as direct manifestation of the bourgeoisie. In 1937 music halls in both Moscow and Leningrad were closed.

== New birth ==
The rebirth of the theater took place in 1960. The dance was the key element of new concept. If the previous version of Moscow music hall was trying to work with singers and poets, the new theater started to place an emphasis on the intercommunion between dances and entertainers. The role of corps-de-ballet increased and became almost equal to the role of the performing star. It was the time to change "performance" word with "concert". At that time Moscow music hall managed to escape from the cabaret style. Such changes were only possible because of Lev Mirov and Alexander Konnikov who invited "Raduga" (Rainbow) dance troupe and other popular artists in order to restore music hall in 1960. M. Bernes, M. Novitsky, K. Lazarenko and A. Belova were among them. New and updated Moscow music hall started to work on the stage of "Zeleny Theater" (Green Theater). The strangest fact was that it wasn't located in Moscow, but on the waterfront in Yalta, where Yuri Gagarin visited it one day. Here are memories about Eleonora Prohnitskaya about that day:

«When we were in Yalta, we offered Gagarin watching “Moscow, Venus and every which where” performance of Moscow music hall that was shown in Zeleny Theater on the beach promenade. Valya and he agreed almost immediately.»

Stage director Aleksandr Konnikov (who was the art director from 1963) and choreographer of “Raduga” Nikolay Holfin created such performances as “When the stars light up” (1960), “Moscow, Venus and every which where” (1961) with music of Matvey Blanter, "Tick-tock, tick-tock" (1962) in cooperation with Lev Mirov. They also created many performances on their own: “One hundred and one day in Paris” (1966), “All colors of rainbow” (1967), “I am the song” (1968), “Moscow Kaleidoscope” (1969). The role of dancers was increasing day by day. Very soon the troupe was finally allowed to perform abroad. It’s worth noting that the first foreign country was France. That was the place where Moscow Music Hall was finally able to show the Russian version of “Moulin Rouge”. 1973 and 1974 were really memorable for the theater, because Moscow Music Hall was staging its last “Red arrow arrives to Moscow” program of Pavel Homsky (who was the artistic director of Mossovet State Academic Theatre) with such stars as Lyubov’ Polischuk and Lev Shimelov. In 1974 the theater was transferred under control of Gosconcert (the Soviet State Concert Company). Konnikov went to Moscow State Variety Theatre, while both the ballet troupe and Moscow music hall cease to exist…

== Moscow music hall these days ==
In 1994, after 20 years of silence art director of “Planeta” variety show theater, Pavel Ravinsky, creates cooperation with art director of Moscow State Variety Theatre, Boris Brunov, protected and sponsored by Culture Committee of Moscow staged new show named “Moscow husic hall is going ahead”. The style of the theater was clear: Music hall was working only with such variety artists as Joseph Kobzon, Alexander Malinin and Dmitry Malikov. All dances were performed by the members of "Planeta" variety show theater.

Only thanks to Pavel Ravinsky and constant support of Joseph Kobzon, Moscow Music Hall became a state theater. Ravinsky becomes art director and the newborn state theater starts the road tour all around Russia with its new "Voyage of dream" and "Spectacular review" programs.

In 2007 son of Pavel Ravinsky, Platon Ravinsky took the place of art director. His wife Irina Ravinskaya becomes the director of the theater. Together they continued the process of theater development. New versions of "Voyage of dream" and "Spectacular review" programs are created under control of chief choreographer Vladislav Lyushnin. New costumes in the unique style of Moscow Music Hall were created for each and every choreographic performance. The importance of the dance is still going higher and dances take the key role in concerts.

In 2008 Moscow music hall was joined by dancer and folk dance choreographer Aleksei Rybalkin (who was working in the Igor Moseyev Ballet)

In 2009, 2010 and 2011 Moscow music hall becomes a constant participant of Dancing with the Stars project in Russia. During that period music hall makes various performances on TV, without making its own shows in Moscow.

In 2015 Music Hall was unites with Mosconcert theater under control of Platon Ravinsky. The theater finally opens its doors for solo performances on the new stage on Kalanchevskaya Street.

== Mentions ==
- Moscow Music Hall was mentioned in The Master and Margarita novel of The Master and Margarita.
- The main story of "Under the circus dome" was used to "Circus" – movie of G. Aleksandrov in 1934.

== Stages ==
- In 1923 – the stage of Aquarium theater
- From 1926 till 1936 – the stage of the closed circus of Nikitiny brothers on Bolshaya Sadovaya Street, 18
- In 1960 – the stage of Zeleny Theater in Yalta.
- From 1960 till 1967 – Hermitage, Theater of Soviet Army etc.
- Starting from 2000 – Moscow Music hall is working on its own stage in Moscow: Kalanchevskaya Street, 33/12.

== See also ==
- St. Petersburg Music Hall
- Music Hall
