= Kashchey the Immortal (film) =

- Theatrical poster
- Directed by: Aleksandr Rou
- Written by: Vladimir Shveitser; Aleksandr Rou
- Starring: Sergei Stolyarov; Georgy Millyar
- Cinematography: Mikhail Kirillov
- Music by: Sergei Pototsky
- Production company: Soyuzdetfilm
- Release dates: May 9, 1945 (Barnaul); May 27, 1945 (Soviet Union)
- Running time: 63 min
- Country: Soviet Union
- Language: Russian

Kashchey the Immortal (Russian: Кащей Бессмертный, romanized: Kashchey bessmertnyy) is a 1945 Soviet fantasy film co-written and directed by Aleksandr Rou. The story and characters are drawn from Slavic folklore, centering on a young man who embarks on a magical adventure to save his beloved from a wicked sorcerer.

== Plot ==
Nikita Kozhemyaka returns to his native village, only to find it in ruins. The young man encounters an old magician who reveals that the village was attacked by the hordes of Koschei the Immortal, who kidnapped the beautiful maid Maria Morevna to be his bride. Nikita resolves to rescue Maria from Koschei and put an end to him. The magician gives him two magical items to aid him on his quest: an invisibility cap and a handful of magic soil before bidding him farewell on his quest. Sometime later, Nikita arrives at the gates of a foreign city Kashchei has conquered. At the entrance, Nikita is accosted by the city guards and loses his horse, though he manages to escape into the city square where a court hearing is in progress. At the hearing, Bulat the Balagur faces execution for the attempted theft of a magic carpet. Nikita decides to rescue Balut, putting on the invisibility cap, he frees Bulat; together they grab the magic carpet and fly away.

Nikita and Bulat fly to and stealthily enter Kashchei's castle, where they find Maria lying lifeless on a bed. They hide as Koschei arrives, watching as he places a ring on her finger, which seems to revive her. Koschei offers Maria to become his wife, who tells him she cannot love someone who has no heart. Koschei insists that he has one. He tells Maria that he keeps it in a black apple growing on a black tree standing on a black mountain. If a brave man approaches the tree, the leaf will open and a flower will appear, which will turn into an apple. Whoever dares to break the apple with his bare hands will find the heart but they will turn into a stone. Maria refuses his proposal and he removes the ring from her finger, returning her to a lifeless state. He throws the ring into a waterfall, which dries up and opens a secret passage which Koschei enters.

Nikita emerges from hiding and places a similar ring on Maria's finger, awakening her. However, when they are about to flee the castle, they discover that the magic hat is missing. Maria takes the ring off her finger and throws it into the waterfall and falls into eternal sleep. Nikita and Bulat leave the castle without her to defeat Koschei. They encounter the sorcerer and Nikita battles him. Koschei uses a spell to summon an army, and Nikita tosses the magic soil into the air, summoning an army to fight for him. As the two battle, Bulat climbs the black mountain and retrieves the apple with Koschei's heart; he breaks the apple open and finds a white dove inside.

Locked in brutal combat, Nikita manages to behead Koschei twice with each time the sorcerer regenerating and continuing his attack. Bulat discovers Koschei's heart in the form of a snake inside the dove and smashes the serpent onto the ground, turning Bulat to stone but causes Koschei to become mortal. Nikita takes the opportunity to slay the sorcerer, his death reverses all the spells and returns Balut to normal. Koschei's army flees and the heroes reunite with Maria.

== Cast ==
- Sergei Stolyarov as Nikita Kozhemyaka
- Alexander Shirshov as Bulat Balagur
- Galina Grigorieva as Maria Morevna
- Georgy Millyar as Kashchey the Immortal / magician
- Ivan Ryzhov as naughty boy
- Sergei Troitsky as sultan
- Leonid Krovitsky as judge
- Sergey Filippov as executioner
- Peter Galadzhev as guard
- Ivan Bobrov as guard
- Emmanuil Geller as guard

== Production ==
=== Development ===
In 1941, filmmaker Aleksandr Rou began the development of his next fantasy project, Ilya Muromets based on Slavic folklore. That year, he and writer Vladimir Shveitser completed a screenplay for the film, however, filming would only commence in 1944. This was due to multiple issues, among them, Soyuzdetfilm struggling with scarce materials during its wartime evacuation in the city of Stalinabad.

== Works cited ==
=== Bibliography ===
- Allison, Deborah (2 September 2021). "The fairy-tale film goes to war: defence of the motherland in Aleksandr Rou's Kashchei the Immortal". Studies in Russian and Soviet Cinema. 15 (3): 206–226. doi:10.1080/17503132.2021.1967554.
- Bogdanov, Konstantin (December 18, 2014). Vox populi: Фольклорные жанры советской культуры [Vox populi: Folklore genres of Soviet culture] (in Russian). New Literary Review. ISBN 978-5-4448-0348-6.
- Millyar, Georgy (June 28, 2015). Minedzhyan, T. (ed.). Я – второй Раневская, или Й – третья буква [I am the second Ranevskaya, or Y is the third letter] (in Russian). AST. ISBN 978-5-4578-3434-7.
- Razzakov, Fedor (May 15, 2022). Marshkova, S. (ed.). Как обуздать еврейство. Все тайны сталинского закулисья [How to Curb Jewry: All the Secrets of Stalin's Behind the Scenes] (in Russian). Algorithm. ISBN 978-5-4572-7568-3.
