= Naum Shafer =

Soviet composer and musicologist (1931–2022)

Naum Grigorievich Shafer (Russian: Наум Григорьевич Шафер; born Nahman Gershevich Shafer, Russian: Нахман Гершевич Шафер; 13 January 1931 – 11 October 2022), also known under his composer pseudonym Nami Gitin, was a Kazakhstani musicologist, professor, phonograph record collector and composer.

== Biography ==
Naum Shafer was born in Chișinău in 1931. In 1940, during the Soviet occupation of Bessarabia, he and his family were deported to Kazakhstan to the special settlement "New Way" in Akmola Region. Notably, they've brought a collection of 30 gramophone records with them. His father was sent to Sverdlovsk Oblast to a lumber camp, but was released two years later.

In 1946 his family moved to Akmolinsk, where he began studying at a music school. After graduating, he studied at the Philological Faculty of the S. Kirov Kazakh National University. There he met famous composer Yevgeny Brusilovsky, who saw talent in young Shafer and taught him music for free.

He was a postgraduate student at the Department of Russian Foreign Literature of the S. Kirov University. The topic of his dissertation research were the works of Bruno Jasieński. Such a topic was also picked for the Candidate of Philological Sciences degree at the Kazakh National Pedagogical University in 1965.

In 1971, he was imprisoned for 1.5 years for possession of Samizdat, his doctoral thesis was cancelled. According to the Chronicle of Current Events, he was persecuted even before arrest, including being accused of Zionism, for which he was fired; the persecutor's speech included threats and anti-Semitic comments. He was rehabilitated only in 1989.

In 1991, he became a professor at the Department of Russian and Foreign Literature of the Pavlodar Pedagogical University.

Naum Schafer's private library and collection of gramophone records, magnetic tape recordings, and audio cassettes became the basis of a house-museum which opened on February 21, 2001.

== Awards ==
- Euro-Asian Jewish Congress «Of Merit» Medal (2011)
- «20 Years of Independence of the Republic of Kazakhstan» Jubilee Medal (2011)
