= Sergei Stolyarov =

Russian and Soviet actor (1911–1969)

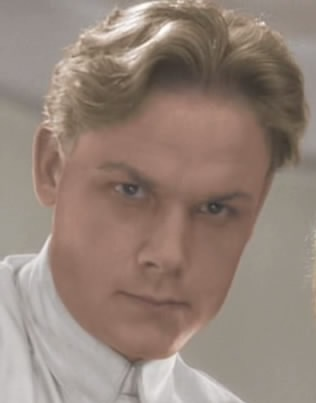
- Born: 17 July 1911 (Note: Stolyarov's birth certificate was lost when he became an orphan during World War I. His previous birth date – November 1 – was chosen by him randomly while in the orphanage. The exact day of birth, July 17 (July 4 in Julian calendar) was discovered from the documents in the beginning of the XXI century.); Bezzubov village, Tula Governorate, Russian Empire
- Died: 9 December 1969 (aged 58); Moscow, Russian SFSR, USSR
- Occupation: Actor
- Years active: 1935–1967

Sergei Dmitrievich Stolyarov (Russian: Серге́й Дми́триевич Столяро́в; 17 July [O.S. 4 July] 1911 – 9 December 1969) was a Russian and Soviet film and theater actor. The winner of the Stalin Prize of the first degree (1951) and People's Artist of the RSFSR (1969), he was a member of the Communist Party of the Soviet Union from 1958 on.

== Selected filmography ==
- 1935 – Aerograd as Vladimir Glushak
- 1936 – Circus as Ivan Petrovich Martynov
- 1940 – Vasilisa the Beautiful as the youngest son, Ivan
- 1944 – Kashchey the Deathless as Nikita Kozhemyaka
- 1951 – Far from Moscow as Alexander Ivanovich Rogov
- 1952 – Sadko as Sadko
- 1956 – Ilya Muromets as Alyosha Popovich
- 1959 – A Man Changes Skin as Vladimir Ivanovich Sinitsyn
- 1967 – The Andromeda Nebula as Dar Veter
