= Alexandrov Ensemble discography =

This is a list of recordings made by the Alexandrov Ensemble (under various titles) since 1928. Within each section (CDs, LPs, 78s etc.) they are in alphabetical order of record labels.

== DVDs ==
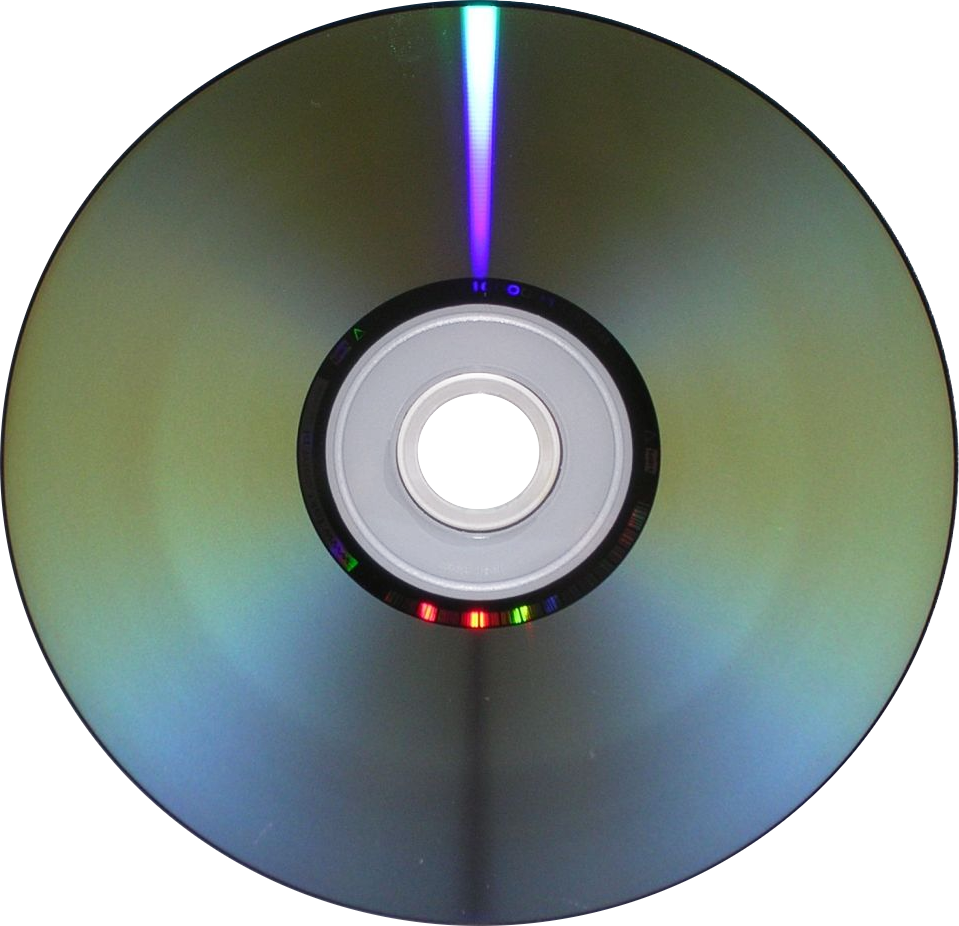
Digital Video Disk

=== Facets: Leningrad Cowboys - Total Balalaika Show ===
- B0007TKHS4 (Region 1 DVD) and B000E8RF24 (Region 2 DVD)
- (dir: Aki Kaurismäki. An unusual and humorous rockumentary with the Alexandrov Ensemble and Leningrad Cowboys recorded live on Senate Square Helsinki in 1993, released 10 May 2005, in English, Finnish, French and Russian, 55 mins.)
  - Included are covers of: Happy Together, Bob Dylan's Knocking on Heaven's Door, Tom Jones' Delilah, ZZ Top's Gimme All Your Lovin' with accordions, Skynyrd's Sweet Home Alabama, Kalinka, Song of the Volga Boatmen, Dark Eyes, Polyushko Pole.
  - NB. The cover of Stairway to Heaven is missing from this DVD.

=== Kultur: Soviet Army Chorus and Dance Ensemble ===
- D1106. ISBN 0-7697-8690-1. B0013N3LIG Region 1 DVD.
- (dir: I. Jugashvili. Musical dir: Boris Alexandrov. Compilation of recordings ca.1960 released 29 April 2008, filmed in Soviet Union, in Russian, 71mins. The Russian technique at that time was to make a silent colour film on location, then dub the sound in the studio. However, there are some superb soundtracks here, if a little crackly.)
1. Forward, On the Way or Let's Go (Choir rocks or sways as if marching. Filmed on Red Square near St Basil's Cathedral, Moscow.)
2. The Birch Tree (soloist: N.T. Gres. Filmed on location in countryside.)
3. Under the Elm Tree, Under the Oak (soloist A.T. Sergeev. Filmed on location).
4. Kamarinskaya (arr. M. Glinka. Balalaika soloist: B.S. Feoktistov. Filmed in studio.)
5. The Golden Rye (soloist: E.M. Belyaev. Filmed on location.)
6. Dance of the Soldiers (music: B. Alexandrov. Soundtrack: Alexandrov Ensemble. Ensemble dance troupe filmed in Moscow.)
7. Listen (soloist V. Eliseev. Filmed in studio.)
8. Stenka Razin soloist: A.T. Sergeev. Filmed on location.)
9. Meadowland (Polyushko Pole) (soundtrack: Alexandrov Ensemble. Filmed on location.)
10. Down the Peterskaya Road (soloist: A.T. Sergeev. Filmed in studio.)
11. The Grey Cuckoo (soloist N.T. Gres. Filmed on location.)
12. Dance of the Cossacks (music: B. Alexandrov. Soundtrack: Alexandrov Ensemble. Ensemble dance troupe filmed in Moscow.)
13. Song of the Volga Boatmen (soloist L. M. Kharitonov. Filmed in studio.)
14. The Girl Next Door (Alexandrov Ensemble. Filmed on location.)
15. Kalinka (soloist E.M. Belyaev. Filmed on location.)
16. Lovely Moonlit Night (soundtrack: Alexandrov Ensemble with soloist E.M. Belyaev. Film of moonlit scene.)
17. Dance of the Zaporozhye Cossacks (soundtrack: Alexandrov Ensemble. Ensemble dance troupe filmed in studio.)
18. Forward, On the Way (reprise. Excerpt from track 1.)

=== Silva America: The Alexandrov Red Army Choir Orchestra - Live in Paris ===
- (SILDV 7004, B00076ON32 Region 1 DVD. Live performance in Paris 16/17 December 2003. Dir: I. Jugashvili. Released 8 February 2005, in English, 124 mins.)
  - Included are: Chorus of the Hebrew Slaves from Nabucco, Bandits' Chorus from Ernani, Spanish Medley: Amapola y Valencia y Granada, excerpt from Boris Godunov, March of the Toreadors from Carmen, Nessun Dorma from Turandot and Di Quella Pira from Il trovatore, Moscow Nights, Silent Night, Jingle Bells, Smuglianka (duet: S. Ivanov and P. Bogachev) and Kalinka.

== CDs ==
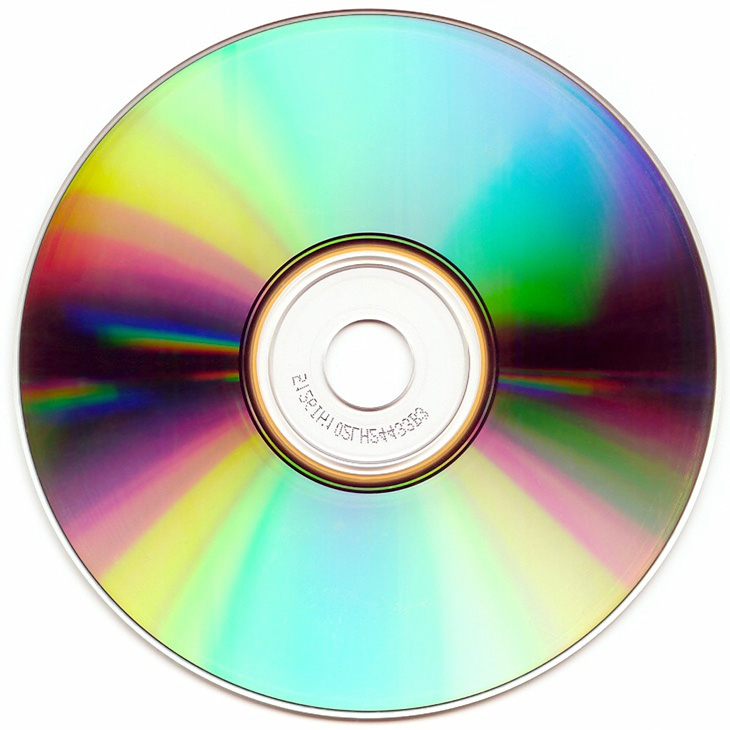
Compact disc

=== Amiga: Zur Edition ===
- (Released 2007. Compilation celebrating Amiga's 60-year anniversary. 4-CD set with 85 tracks, including the folk song Im schönsten Wiesengrunde sung by V. Nikitin recorded at the August 1948 Peace Concert at the Gendarmenmarkt, Berlin.)

=== Analekta: The Red Army Chorus, the Best of the Original Ensemble, AN28800 ===
- (ASIN: B00005UCGV. Released October 2002; re-released February 2008. Soloists include Barseg Tumanyan. 69 mins. Tracks: Riders' March, Troika, Polyushko Pole, When Soldiers Sing, Nightingales, Dark Eyes, Brave Don Cossacks, from Ernani: Evviva! Beviam! Nel vino cerchiam, The Song of the Volga Boatmen, Russian Song, Kalinka, from Boris Godunov: Hark, 'tis the knell of death, from Carmen: Toreador, Dear Soul, Ukrainian Folk Song, Midnight in Moscow, excerpts from May Night, I Got Plenty o' Nuttin' from Porgy and Bess, Granada, USSR National Anthem.)

=== Analekta: The Red Army Chorus, ASIN: B001B5CS7Q ===
- (Released September 2008. Conductors A. Maltsev, I. Agafonnikov. Soloists include Barseg Tumanyan and Peter Gluboky.)

=== Ariola: The Red Army Ensemble; Royal Albert Hall ===
- (2-CD set. Same content as cassette: "Ariola: The Red Army Ensemble, Royal Albert Hall, 503 278" - see below.)

Ariola - released through BMG Enterprises. (c)(b) 1988 BMG Records 353 278 - set of two discs

=== Bella: Boris Alexandrov Ensemble & Russian State Choir, ASIN: B00000AZLO ===
- (Released October 1995.)

=== Bellaphon: Russland, wie es singt und lacht 288.05.017 ===
- (Released 1990. Conductor B. Alexandrov. Included are; Dance Dance, Suliko, Winter Evening (1951) (soloist V. Nikitin).)

=== BMG France: Les Choeurs de L'Armée Rouge 74321423482 ===
- (Released 1996. 2-CD set. Conductor: B. Alexandrov. Included tracks are: Polyushko Pole, Along the Peterskaya Road, Katyusha, Kalinka, Oh You Rye, The Elm and the Oak, Dark Eyes, The Birch, In a Sunny Field, Rough Sea Spray (duet E. Belyaev and A. Kusleev), Crane.)

=== Le Chant du Monde: Les Choeurs de L'Armée Rouge à Paris, LDX274768 ===
- (dir: Boris Alexandrov, recorded Paris 1960, released 1961, re-released 1993):
1. The Birch Tree (French: La Chanson du Bouleau) (1960)
2. Chant des Partisans (French: Les Partisans) (1960)
3. Cold Waves Lapping (French: Battus Par les Vagues Froides) (1960)
4. Ukraine Poem (French: Poeme a l'Ukraine) (1960)
5. On the Way (French: En Route) (1960)
6. Soldiers' Choir from Faust (French: Choeur des Soldats de Faust) (1960)
7. Leaving Song (French: Le Chant du Depart) (1960)
8. Polyushko Pole (Oh Fields My Fields) (French: Plaine, Ma Plaine) (1960)
9. The Grey Cuckoo (French: Le Coucou Gris) (1960)
10. Song of Youth (French: Chant du Voyageur) (1960)
11. The Neighbour (French: La Voisine) (1960)
12. Along the Peterskaya Road (French: Le Long de la Peterskaia) (1960)
13. The Liberation Song (French: Le Chant de la Liberation) (1960)

=== The Eastern Front: Letters From the Front, Front 003 ===
- (Compilation of original recordings alternating with modern atmospheric artworks, released May 9, 2006 "to celebrate the 61st Anniversary of Great Victory in World War II". Dedicated to Soviet fighters and their allies in World War II. Sold in a thick A3 paper, folded into a triangle to imitate the triangular-folded World War II servicemen's letters from the Soviet front. A facsimile World War II photo of Soviet servicemen is included. The CD contains a bonus video of the Moscow Victory Parade of 1945. CD in Russian; paper cover in English.)
1. Invasion: V. Molotov's speech upon Germany's invasion of the Soviet Union (June 22, 1941)
2. Svyaschennaya Voyna, or Sacred War (music: A. Alexandrov). Alexandrov Ensemble (June 1941)
3. Letter 1 (Westwind, France, 2005).
4. Call for Defence (Joseph Stalin's speech, 1941).
5. In a Front Zone Forest (G. Vinogradov, 1945).
6. Everything is For the Front (Joseph Stalin's speech, 1941).
7. Letter II (Westwind, France, 2005).
8. Oh Roads (G. Abramov, 1945).
9. Letter III (Westwind, France, 2005).
10. Wait for Me (G. Vinogradov, 1942).
11. Letter IV (Westwind, France, 2005).
12. This is the Soviet Information Bureau . . . (Yuri Levitan's broadcast, February 1943, after the end of the Battle of Stalingrad).
13. Night Over Leningrad (Klavdiya Shulzhenko, 1942).
14. Two Maxims (G. Vinogradov, 1942).
15. It was time to forget, inspired by Konstantin Simonov's poem Wait For Me, 1941 (Storm of Capricorn, 2005/06).
16. Lizaveta (P. Kirichek, 1943).
17. Nothing bad can happen to me, inspired by Dark Night, originally sung by M. Bernes in the Soviet movie Two Soldiers, 1942. (Neon Rain, France 2005/06).
18. Song of a Front Truck Driver (M. Bernes, 1945).
19. Soldier's Father (Silence and Strength, Israel, 2006).
20. Volchovskaya Drinking Song (Unknown soloist, 1942).
21. The War Went On . . . (Silence and Strength, Israel 2006).
22. Song of the Soviet Army, or Invincible and Legendary (music: A. Alexandrov) (Alexandrov Ensemble, 1945).
23. Victory (Yuri Levitan's broadcast, May 9, 1945, the day when the Soviet Union marked V-E Day, and the Red Army entered Prague.).

=== EMI Angel: Volga Boat Song. Soviet Army Chorus and Band, CC30-9078. Out of print ===
- (Same contents as EMI CDC-7-47833-2)

=== EMI: Soviet Army Chorus & Band, CDC-7-47833-2 DIDX-1015 ===
- (dir: Boris Alexandrov, recorded 1956/1963, compiled 1986):
1. Song of Youth (1956)
2. The Birch Tree (1956) (soloist: I. Didenko)
3. Far Away (1956) (soloist: E. Belyaev)
4. Song of the Volga Boatmen (1956) (soloist: A. Eisen)
5. You Are Always Beautiful (1956) (soloist: E. Belyaev)
6. Along Peterskaya Street (1956) (soloist: A. Sergeev)
7. It's a Long Way to Tipperary (1956) (soloist: K. Gerasimov)
8. Ah Lovely Night (1956) (soloist: N. Polozkov)
9. Kamarinskaya (1963) (Balalaika soloist: B.S. Feoktistov)
10. Annie Laurie (1963) (soloist: E. Belyaev)
11. Polyushko Pole (Song of the Plains/Meadowland) (1956)
12. Kalinka (1956) (soloist: E. Belyaev)
13. Bandura (1956) (soloists: I. Savchuk; V. Fedorov)
14. Oh No John (1956) (soloist: A. Eisen)
15. Snowflakes (1956)(soloist: I. Didenko)
16. Ukrainian Poem (1956) (soloist: A. Sergeev)
17. Soldiers' Chorus from The Decembrists (by Yuri Shaporin) (1956)

=== EMI Classics: Red Army Ensemble, 0946-3-92030-2-4 ===
- (dir: Boris Alexandrov. Most tracks recorded London 1956 (The Ensemble's first UK visit); a few in 1963 and 2007. Compiled 2007):
1. Song of Youth (1956)
2. A Birch Tree (1956) (soloist: I. Didenko)
3. Far Away (1956) (soloist: E. Belyaev)
4. You Are Always Beautiful (1956) (soloist: E. Belyaev)
5. Kalinka (1956) (soloist: E. Belyaev)
6. Along Peterskaya Street/Road (1956) (soloist: A. Sergeev)
7. Bandura (1956) (soloists: I. Savchuk; V. Fedorov)
8. Soldiers' Chorus (1956)
9. Beautiful Moonlit Night (1963) (soloist: E. Belyaev)
10. Kamarinskaya (1963) (Balalaika soloist: B.S. Feoktistov)
11. Annie Laurie (1963) (soloist: E. Belyaev)
12. Black Eyebrows (1956) (soloist: I. Savchuk)
13. Ukrainian Poem (1956) (soloist: A. Sergeev)
14. Oh No John (1956) (soloist: A. Eisen)
15. Song of the Plains/Meadowland or Polyushko Pole (1956)
16. Snowflakes (1956) (soloist: I. Didenko)
17. Song of the Volga Boatmen (1956) (soloist: A. Eisen)
18. Nut-brown Maiden (1956) (soloists: N. Abramov; I. Savchuk)
19. The Little Bells (1956) (soloist: N. Abramov)
20. Dubinushka (1956) (soloist: A. Sergeev)
21. It's a Long Way to Tipperary (1956) (soloist: K. Gerasimov)
22. God Save the Queen (2007)

=== EMI France: Les Choeurs de L'Armée Rouge, 8334342 ===
- (Conductor: Boris Alexandrov. Apparently much of this is re-mastered 1956 tracks from EMI CDC-7-47833-2. . Soloists include: Evgeny Belyaev and Ivan A. Didenko).
- Included are: Kalinka, Lovely Moonlit Night, Along the Peterskaya Road, Kamarinskaya, You Are Always Beautiful, Cossack Dance, Ukrainian Poem, Song of Youth, The Birch Tree, Bandura, Oh No John, Song of the Volga Boatmen, Annie Laurie and the Soldiers' Chorus from The Decembrists.

=== Ensemble Independent: 70th Anniversary: The Alexandrov Red Army Chorus, AA980001-2 ===
- (2-CD set. Compilation released 1998, 70yrs after the Ensemble was created in 1928. Conductors: Boris Aleksandrov, Igor Agafonnikov, Victor Fyodorov. Packaging includes information booklet in Russian, English, French and German. Included are: The Birch, Katyusha, Little Bells, Polyushko Pole, Sacred War (Svyaschennaya Voyna), Samovars, Along the Road to Peterskaya, Nightingales, Kalinka, Rough Sea Spray (duet E. Belyaev and A. Kusleev), Nut Brown Girl, The Elm and the Oak, Road, Black Eyes, Let's Go!.)

=== Forever Gold: The Red Army Choir, FG317 ===
- (Dir: Boris Alexandrov i.e. pre-1987, compiled 2005):
1. Kalinka
2. Beautiful Mum (French: Belle Maman)
3. The Birch Tree (French: La Chanson du Bouleau)
4. Kalinouchka
5. Polyushko Pole (Oh Fields My Fields) (French: Plaine, Ma Plaine)
6. Listen (French: Ecoute)
7. Doubinouchka
8. Chant des Partisans (French: Les Partisans)
9. Out of the Woods (French: En Sortant de la Foret)
10. Funeral Song (French: Chant Funebre)

=== His Master's Voice Classics: Red Army Favourites, His Master's Voice 5730452 ===
- (Same contents as EMI CDC-7-47833-2).

=== Madacy: Alexandrov Red Army Chorus and Dance Ensemble 1, Live, ASIN: B00063QKEQ ===
- (Released January 1992. Tracks: O Canada, USSR National Anthem, Sailor Dance, Ukrainian Poem, Festive March, Palekh Box, Cossack Song, Do Russians Want War?, Mon Pays, Cossack Cavalry Dance.)

=== Madacy: Alexandrov Red Army Chorus and Dance Ensemble 2, Live, ASIN: B00063QCEO ===
- (Released January 1992. Tracks: Love Lights the World, Dance of the Cossacks, Sorochinskaya Market, Holiday March, Partisan Song, Song of the Volga Boatmen, Black Eyebrows, Cossack Song, Ukrainian Folk Song.)

=== Melodiya: Sacred War (in Russian), MELCD60-00938/1 ===
- (Compiled and released 2005, for the 60th anniversary of 1945. Military songs. ASIN: B000P3TD5U. Only 5 songs are by the Alexandrov Ensemble: Nos 1,3,11,12,19.)
1. Echelon song: Holy War or Svyaschennaya Voyna (Russian Священная война) (Alexandrov Ensemble)
2. Two Maxims (Russian: Два Максима) (soloist G. Vinogradov)
3. Oh the Road (Russian: Эх, дороги) (soloist G. Vinogradov)
4. Odessa: Love is Shrouded in Mist (soloist K. Lisovsky)
5. In the Dugout or Zemlyanka (Russian: В землянке) (soloist Vladimir Troshin)
6. Sinij platochek (soloist Klavdiya Shul'zhenko)
7. Tyomnaya noch' (soloist Mark Bernes)
8. Treasured Stone (Russian: Заветный камень) (soloist Yuri Bogatikov)
9. Zhdi menya (soloist Yuri Gulyaev)
10. Rustling Bryansk Forest (Russian: Шумел сурово брянский лес) (soloist G. Abramov)
11. Artillery March (Russian: Марш артиллерии) (Alexandrov Ensemble)
12. Goodbye City and Hut (Russian: До свиданья, города и хаты) (Alexandrov Ensemble)
13. Come On (Russian: Давай закурим) (soloist Klavdiya Shul'zhenko)
14. Accidental Waltz (Russian: Случайный вальс) (soloist L. Utyosov)
15. Song of the Front Driver (soloist Mark Bernes)
16. My Favourite (Russian: Моя любимая) (soloist S.Lemeshev)
17. Song of a War Correspondent (soloist L.Utyosov)
18. In a Sunny Forest Clearing/Meadow (Russian: На солнечной поляночке) (soloist E.Flaks)
19. Nightingales (Russian: Соловьи) (Alexandrov Ensemble; soloist E.Belyaev)
20. It's a Long Time Since We Weren't Home (Russian: Давно мы дома не были) (duet: V. Bunchikov and V. Nechaev).

=== Melodiya: Wartime Choruses, in memory of 9th May 1945, MCD207, Out of print ===
- (Probably released 1985, 40yrs after 1945. Conductor: Boris Aleksandrov. Included are: Sacred War or Svyaschennaya Voyna, Song of the Dnieper, In the Sunny Field, Road, Evening on the Roadstead, Nightingales (soloist E. Belyaev.)

=== Melodiya Russian: 50th Anniversary of Victory Day 1945, RDCD00434 ===
- (Released 1995. Conductor: B. Aleksandrov. Only 4 songs are by the Alexandrov Ensemble. Included are: Nightingale (soloist E. Belyaev), Evening on the Roadstead, Where Are Your Arms, Take the Mantle.)

=== Melodiya Military Archives Records: Red Army Ensemble Military Music, MAR-RAM1967 ===
- (2-CD set. Recorded 1963/67. Release date possibly 1967. Conductor: B. Aleksandrov. Included are: Sacred War (Svyaschennaya Voyna), Polyushka Pole, Evening in Moscow Suburbs, Song of Youth, USSR National Anthem, Let's Go!, Kalinka, Moonlight, Soldiers' chorus from the opera Faust, You Are Always Beautiful, Nightingales (soloist E. Belyaev), Soldiers' chorus from the opera The Decembrists, Along the Peterskaya Road.)

=== Melodiya Bomba: Best Lyric Songs, BoMB033-204 ===
- (Compilation, released 2006. Conductor B. Aleksandrov. Soloists include V.I. Anisimov. Included are: unknown song (duet L.M. Kharitoniv and I.S. Bukreev), I Took You Into the Tundra (soloist I.S. Bukreev or E.M. Belyaev), unknown song (soloist A.T. Sergeev), Let's Go!, Sky-Blue Eyes (1978) (soloist I.S. Bukreev), You Are Always Beautiful (soloist E.M. Belyaev), Our Friends (soloist E.M. Belyaev), Before the Long Journey (soloist E.M. Belyaev), Nightingale (soloist E.M. Belyaev), Nut Brown Girl, Fatherland (soloist B. Shapenko), Crane (soloist V.L. Ruslanov).)

=== Melodiya: Eh Dorogi, MELCD6000615 ===
- (Compilation released 2006. Recorded 1948–65. In Russian 75 mins. Not all tracks are by Alexandrov Ensemble. Included are: Track 1. Sacred War or Svyaschennaya Voyna, 3. Front Line in the Forest (soloist G. Vinogradov), 5. Friends (soloist E. Belyaev), 7. John Cornflower (soloists L. Kharitonov and I. Bukreev), 9. Treasured Stone (soloist M. Reyes), 12. Rustling Bryansk Forest (soloist G. Abramov), 17. Evening on the Roadstead (soloists V. Bunchikov and V. Nechaev), 19. Katyusha (soloist G. Vinogradov), Oh Roads or Eh Dorogi (soloist G. Vinogradov).)

=== Melodiya: Kalinka, Popular Russian Songs, ASIN: B000E1JO0W ===
- (Released 2000.)

=== Melodiya: Moonlight Over Moscow, ASIN: B000003ETF ===
- (Released July 1996. Conductor B. Alexandrov with USSR State Russian Choir and other conductors. Soloists: Ivan Petrov, Evgeny Nesterenko, Artur Eisen, Paata Burchuladze. Tracks are: Kalinka, Polyushko Pole, Monotonously Rings The Bell, Song of the Volga Boatmen (soloist I. Petrov), Twelve Robbers, Warsovienne, Ah Nastassia, A Birch Tree In The Field, Stenka Razin, Steppe Oh Steppe Around, Along Piterskaya Road, The Red Sarafan, Poem Of The Ukraine, Such A Moonlight Night, Farewell My Sweetheart, Suliko, En Route.)

=== Olympia: Slavonic Farewell, MKM 85 ===
- (Released 2003. Conductor Igor Agafonnikov. Tracks are: Following song (M. Glinka, N. Kukolnik), Soldier's song from the opera The Decembrists (Y. Shaporin), The Sun has Disappeared Behind the Mountain (M. Blanter, A. Kovalenko), Nightingales (V. Soloviev-Sedoi, A. Fatianov), Field (L. Knipper, V. Gusev), Along the Valleys and Mountains (Partisan song, arr. by A. Aleksandrov), Doncy-guys (Traditional song, arr. by B. Aleksandrov), Rock (Traditional song, arr. by B. Aleksandrov), The Cossack Was Riding over Dunai (Traditional song, arr. by V. Ogarkov), My Beloved One Lives (Traditional song, arr. by V. Ogarkov), Dark Eyes (Traditional song, arr. by V. Ogarkov), Twelve Robbers (Traditional song, words by N. Nekrasov, arr. by V. Ogarkov), The Bell is Ringing Monotonously (Traditional song, arr. by A. Sveshnikov), I Will Harness a Troika of Swift Steeds (Traditional song, words by N. Nekrasov, arr. by V. Ogarkov), Slavyanka Partying (V. Agapkin, V. Fedotov), Masculine Boldness Went on the Spree (From the opera "Boris Godunov" by M. Mussorgsky)

=== Olympia: Wartime Choruses: Alexandrov Song and Dance Ensemble of the Soviet Army, ASIN: B000Y15TLU ===
- (Release date unknown. Russian songs from World War II.)

=== Silva Classics: The Best of the Red Army Choir, SILKD6034 ===
- (Compiled 2001/02. Conductors: V. Fedorov; B. Alexandrov; I. Agafonnikov; Y. Petrov; A. Maltsev; K. Vinogradov; E. Misailov; N. Mikhailov; E. Pitianko; V. Korobko; V. Samsonenko)

==== Disk 1 ====
1. Kalinka (soloist: V. Shtefoutsa)
2. Chant des Partisans
3. Suliko
4. Korobelniki (soloist: V. Shtefoutsa)
5. On the Road
6. My Country (soloist: L. Pehenitchni)
7. The Red Army is the Strongest
8. Moscow Nights (soloist: I. Bukreev)
9. Along Peterskaya Street/Road (soloist: A. Sergeev)
10. Smuglianka (soloists: S. Ivanov; P. Bogachev)
11. Troika (soloist: B. Jaivoronok)
12. Ah Nastassia (soloist: A. Sergeev)
13. Echelon Song
14. My Army
15. Civil War Songs (The Red Cavalry (soloist: S. Frolov), Beyond the River, Hello on the Way)
16. Bella Ciao (soloists: I. Bukreev; P. Slastnoi)

==== Disk 2 ====
1. National Anthem of the Soviet Union
2. Polyushko Pole, (Oh Fields My Fields)
3. The Cliff
4. The Cossacks
5. In the Central Steppes (soloist: E. Belyaev)
6. Gandzia (soloist: B. Jaivoronok)
7. Cossack Song
8. The Roads (soloist: A. Martinov)
9. Song of the Volga Boatmen (soloist: A. Eisen)
10. Dark Eyes (soloist: V. Gavva) (trumpet soloist: A. Molostov)
11. Let's Go (from the film Maxime Perepelitsa. The one in which the choir rocks as if marching.)
12. The Birch Tree (soloist: K. Lisovski)
13. The Road Song
14. The Samovars (soloists: S. Ivanov; P. Bogachev)
15. Varchavianka
16. Slavery and Suffering

=== Silva Screen: Alexandrov Red Army Choir & Orchestra Live in Paris 0738572603823 ===
- (Released 2005. Live recording, possibly 1960. Tracks: Overture Russian National Anthem, Polyushko Pole, Sacred War or Svyaschennaya Voyna, In the Sunny Clearing, Kalinka, We Sing to Thee, On the Road, Smuglianka, Partisan Song, Along the Peterskaya Road, Dark Eyes, Chorus of the Hebrew Slaves from Nabucco, Bandits Chorus, Spanish medley, excerpt from Boris Godunov, March of the Toreadors from Carmen, Nessun Dorma from Turandot, Di quella pira from Il trovatore, Katyusha, Moscow Nights.)

=== Soldore: Les Choeurs de L'Armée Rouge, SOL620 ===
- (Released 2003 in France; packaging in French. Re-released 2005 in UK and Germany under different cover, but still in French. Conductor B. Alexandrov, but some songs arr. by A.V. Alxandrov. Soloists include N. Abramov and A. Sergeev. Included are: The Birch, Kalinka (soloist V. Nikitin), Polyushko Pole, Partisan Song, Belle Maman, Dubinushka.)

=== Supraphon: Alexandrovci, The A.S.D.E. in Prague, SU5471-2 301 ===
- (Originally recorded 1946–1951 in Prague's Domovina studio, ready for the Ensemble's Czech tour 1952; except tracks 18/22 in unknown studio 1946. After the Czechoslovak coup d'état of 1948, the music of Russia was being brought into Czechoslovakia on a much larger scale than previously. This compilation released Jan 2003.)
1. Guard Song (music by A.V. Alexandrov) (duet K.G. Gerasimov; V.V. Puchkov) (1951)
2. Long Live Our Land (music by B.A. Alexandrov) (duet G.I. Babaev; V.V. Puchkov) (1951)
3. I Loved You (soloist V.P. Vinogradov) (1951)
4. I Look Up in the Sky (soloist I.I. Savchuk) (1951)
5. A Tiny Village I See (1951)
6. Peace Shield (1951)
7. The Oath (music by V. Alexandrov) (soloist Benjamin Bycheev) (1951)
8. Mary: Romance (soloist V.N. Katerinsky) (1951)
9. Winter Evening (soloist V.I. Nikitin) (1951)
10. Stenka Razin arr. B.A. Alexandrov (soloist A.T. Sergeev) (1951)
11. Far From the Town's Bustle (soloist V.P. Vinogradov) (1951)
12. Rolling on to Prague (1951)
13. Green Grass (soloist G.I. Babaev) (1951)
14. Uncle Nitwit (soloist A.T. Sergeev) (1951)
15. Song of the Mayor (from Rimsky-Korsakov's May Night) (soloist V.V. Puchkov) (1951)
16. Song of the Volga Boatmen (1951)
17. Sacred War or Svyaschennaya Voyna (music by A.V. Alexandrov) (1948)
18. Resistance Fighters Song (arr. B.A. Alexandrov) (1946)
19. Troika (soloist V.I. Nikitin) (1948)
20. Song of Peace (music by Shostakovich) (1950)
21. Song of my Country (music by Shostakovich) (soloist V.P. Vinogradov) (listed as 1952)
22. Polyushko Pole (1946).

=== Teldec Japan: Moscow Nights, Red Star Red Army Chorus WPCC-5349, Out of print ===
- (Recorded 1992. Conductor is not B. Alexandrov. Included are: Russian National Anthem, The Birch, Stenka Razin, Suliko, Oh You Rye (soloist E.M. Belyaev).)

=== Teldec: Kalinka, Red Star Red Army Chorus, 090317730721 ===
- (Released Sept 1992. Artists are: Evgeny Belyaev, Evgeny Grekhov, Nikolai Nizienko, Sergei Dzhemelinsky, Valery Zazhigin, Vladimir Deshko. 67 mins. Tracks are: Regimental Polka, Kalinka, Symphony no 4 in D major, Op. 41 Poem of the Komsomol Fighter: Polyushko Pole, Song of the Volga Boatmen, The Sun Set Behind a Mountain, Swallow (Armenian Folksong), Pine Trees are Rustling, Kamarinskaya, Brave Don Cossacks, Wait For Your Soldier, Dark Eyes, Someone's Horse is Standing There, In the Sunny Meadow, The Cliff, Tale of Tsar Saltan: Suite, Op. 57 – Flight of the Bumblebee, Dark Eyebrows, Dubinushka, Song of the Volga, On the March.)

=== Victor Entertainment: Russian Folk Songs, VICP-41059-60 ===
- (2-CD set. Released 1998. Only 9 of the tracks are by the Alexandrov Ensemble under conductor B. Alexandrov. The rest are by the Song and Dance Ensemble of the Moscow Military District, led by E. Victor. Tracks by the Alexandrov Ensemble include: Moscow, Ah Nastassia, Nut Brown Girl, Death of Varyag, Oh You Rye (soloist E. Belyaev), Little Bells, Rough Sea Spray, Along the Peterskaya Road (soloist S. Frolov), Song of the Volga Boatmen.)

=== Victor Entertainment: VICS-60006-10 ===
- (5-CD set of 80 Russian folk songs, in which the Alexandrov Ensemble under conductor B. Alexandrov features on the 2nd and 3rd CDs. Tracks by the Alexandrov Ensemble include: Ah Nastassia, Let's Go, Evening on the Roadstead, Troika, Nut Brown Girl, Rough Sea Spray (duet: E. Belyaev and A. Kusleev), Tanks, Men, Oh You Rye, Cantata Alexander Nevsky from My Homeland (by Alexandrov).)

=== Unknown label: МК-МУЗЫКА MKM117 ===
- (Recorded 1956/63. Released 2002. In Russian. Conductor: B. Aleksandrov. Included are: Song of Youth, Annie Laurie, The Birch, Kalinka, Bandura, You Are Always Beautiful, Oh No John, Road to Peterskaya, Soldiers chorus from The Decembrists, Kamarinskaya. Soloists include E. Belyaev.)

Back to Alexandrov Ensemble page, or to Alexandrov Ensemble soloists page.

== Audio cassettes ==
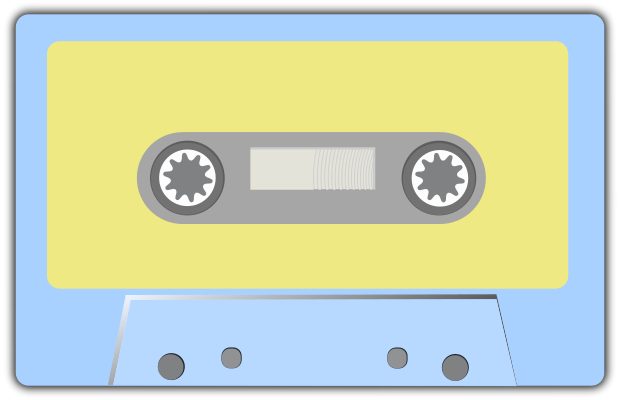
Cassette tape

=== Ariola: The Red Army Ensemble, Royal Albert Hall, 503 278 ===
- (Recorded London 24–26 March 1988; released 1988. 2-cassette set. A leaflet is included, with images showing that this is the same performance as in Prism VHS PLATV310. The VHS shows 32–36 in the choir, but the Ariola cassette leaflet lists 50 named choristers.)
  - 1A: British National Anthem, Russian National Anthem, Polyushko Pole (Russian Fields), Song of the Volga Boatmen, Festive Overture, My Motherland (soloist Igor Miroshnichenko), Parade on Red Square (duet V. Liksakov, A. Krush).
  - 1B: Barinya, Live and Don't Be Sad (soloist Galina Chernoba), Above Clear Fields (soloist Galina Chernoba), Yesterday (soloist Alexei Trubochkin), Di quella pira from Il trovatore (soloist Stepan Fitsych), La donna e mobile from Rigoletto (soloist Stepan Fitsych), No John (soloist V. Liksakov), Brave Soldiers (soloist V. Kuleshov).
  - 2A: Unharness Your Horses Oh Guys, Cossack Dance, Cold Waves Lapping (Varyag), Quiet Quiet from Rigoletto, Korobeiniki (duet Tatiyana Tishura, Mikolai Polozkov), Serenade of the Stutterer (K-K-K-Katy) (actor A. Berezniak).
  - 2B: Cossack Goes to the Danube (soloist A. Solovyanenko), 'O Sole Mio (soloist A. Solovyanenko), Amapola, Kalinka, Soldiers Friendship Dance, Auld Lang Syne (duet Nikolai Ustin, V. Postinikov), Kalinka (reprise).

=== Fiesta: Song of Russia, ASIN: B00006AWIT, Out of print ===
- (Released 1990.)

== VHS ==
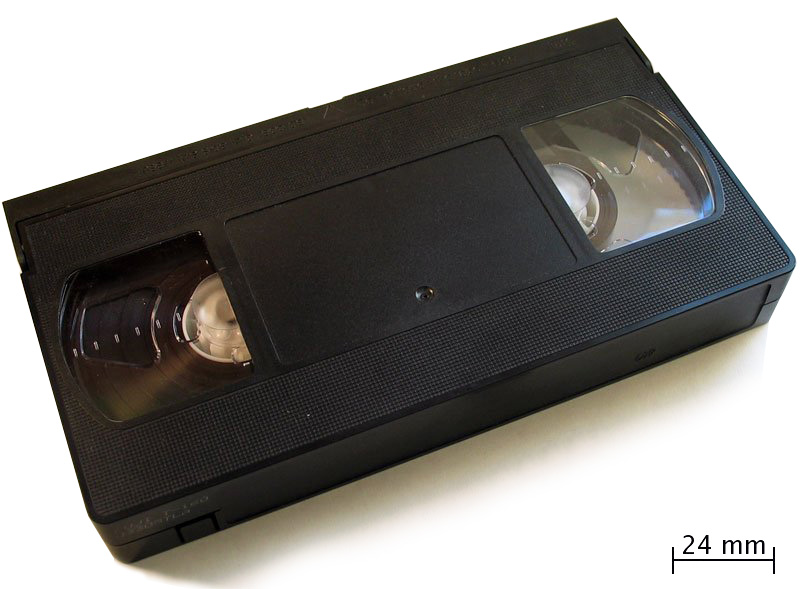
VHS tape.

=== Kultur: Soviet Army Chorus and Dance Ensemble ===
- V1106 (now available as DVD B000ETRA2S – see above).
- (dir: I. Jugashvili. Compilation of earlier recordings, filmed in Soviet Union, in Russian, 78mins. Conductor: Boris Alexandrov. Soloists include Evgeny Belyaev.)
  - Included are: On the Way, The Birch Tree, Kamarinskaya (balalaika soloist: Boris Feoktistov), Oh You Rye (soloist: E. Belyaev), Dance of the Seven Soldiers, Listen (soloist: Abramov), Stenka Razin (soloist: A. Sergeev), Polyushko Pole, Along the Road to Peterskaya (soloist: A. Sergeev), Song of the Volga Boatmen (soloist: L. M. Kharitonov) The Grey Cuckoo, Dance of the Cossacks, Kalinka, Beautiful Moonlit Night (soloist: E. Belyaev), Cossack Dance.

=== Prism Leisure Corporation: The Red Army Ensemble, Video Special, PLATV310 ===
- (Released 1990. Recorded London 1988. 60 mins. Dir. Rod Taylor. Principal conductor: Vladimir Gordeev. No information leaflet. Video shows choir of up to 36; orchestra and dance troupe are the usual size, though. When the tour reached Leicester, the small audience talked of rumours of 20-25 defections by Ensemble members, and of V. Kuleshov and his own choristers stepping in to partially fill the gap. Video programme includes a selection of 10 acts, taken from a list of 26 songs and dances listed on the box: 1. Dance (possibly Soldiers Friendship dance); 2. Cossack Goes to the Danube (soloist Anatoly Solovyanenko); 3. Dance (possibly Gopak – Ukrainian); 4. Two-Eskimos-fighting dance; 5. Dance (possibly Kazak); Brave Soldiers (soloist Victor Kuleshov); 7. Sailors' Dance; 8. Serenade of a Stutterer (K-K-K-Katy) (actor Alexandr Bereznyak) image; 9. Dance (possibly Kamarinskaya); 10. Kalinka (soloist Anatoly Solovyanenko).)

== Singles and EPs ==
=== Singles (7inch, 45rpm) ===
==== Columbia: The Soviet Army Ensemble, SEL1605 ====
- (Release date unknown. Cover has photo of B. Alexandrov conducting choir.)

==== Melodiya: The Alexandrov Song and Dance Ensemble of the Soviet Army, 45C-001211-2 ====
- (Recorded/released ca. 1960. Sleeve notes in |Russian, English and French. B. Alexandrov pictured on sleeve. Tracks are: Stenka Razin, Aye Twas on the Hill, The Oak and the Elm.)

=== EPs (45rpm) ===
==== Columbia: The Red Army Ensemble, SEL1706 ====
- (Conductor B. Alexandrov. Tracks are: Polyushko Pole, Annie Laurie, Kamarinskaya, The Courageous Don Cossacks.)

==== Radio DDR 1 (Gesellschaft für DSF): Auf gutem Weg Mit Guten Freunden, 4 30 033 4 30 033 ====
- (Songs recorded Gendarmenmarkt, Berlin, August 1948, at the Berlin Peace Concert; speeches recorded 1988. Never released, but "given away as present for some members of the organisation Deutsch-Sowjetische Freundschaft (DSF)" in 1988. Different cat. no. on sleeve: 4 35 033. Conductor: B. Alexandrov. Images of sleeve. Mückenberger has signed the front, but that is not Nikitin's signature on the back. The photo on the back shows the Alexandrov Ensemble and female dancers among great crowds beneath the facade of a ruined cathedral.).
  - A1: Speech by Erich Mückenberger. Als Präsident Der Gesellschaft Für Deutsch-Sowjetische Freundschaft Überreiche Ich Ihnen In Anerkennung Ihrer Verdienste Um Unsere Herzenssache Diese Schallplatte. Erich Mückenberger was chairman of the German-Soviet Friendship Society 1978–1989, and this is his introduction to the recordings.
  - A2: Im Schönsten Wiesengrunde (soloist V. Nikitin).
  - B1: Ich Freue Mich, Ihnen Mein Lied Zu Singen (soloist V. Nikitin): not a song, but a spoken introduction by Nikitin to his performance of Kalinka.
  - B2: Kalinka (soloist V. Nikitin).

== LPs ==
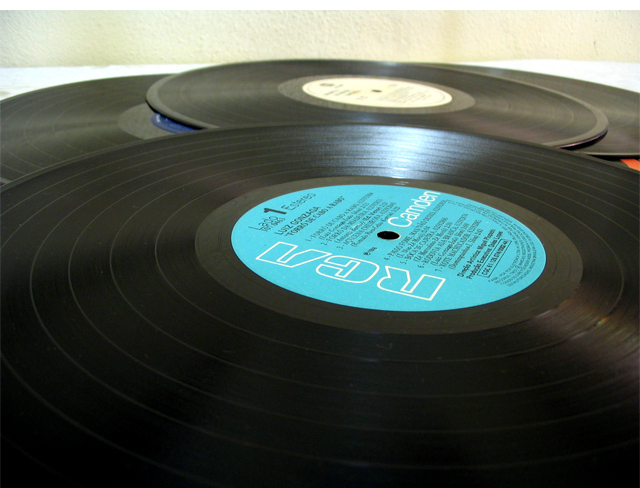
vinyl 33rpm gramophone records.

=== Artia: The Red Army Marches in Hi-Fi ===
- (ASIN: B001HKF32M. Release date unknown.)

=== Columbia: The Soviet Army Ensemble Volumes 1 & 2, 33C 1049 and 1050 ===
- 10 inch LPs. Volume 1: 8 tracks. Side 1: Song of Youth, A Birch-tree in a field did stand (soloist I. Didenko), Far Away (soloist E. Belyaev), You are always beautiful (soloist E. Belyaev). Side 2: Kalinka (soloist E. Belyaev), Along Peter's Street (soloist A. Sergeyev), Bandura (soloists I. Savchuk and V. Fedorov), Soldier's Chorus (from The Decembrists, an opera by Y. Shaparin). Volume 2: 9 tracks. Side 1: Black Eyebrows (soloist I. Savchuk), Ukrainian Poem (soloist A. Sergeyev), Oh, no! John! (soloist A. Eizen), Over the Fields. Side 2: Volga Boat Song (soloist A. Eizen), Nut-brown Maiden (soloists N. Abramov and I. Savchuk), The Little Bells (soloist N. Abramov), Song of the Hammer (soloist A. Sergeyev), Tipperary (soloist K. Gerasimov).

=== Columbia: The Red Army Ensemble, SAX 2487 or 33CX 1844 ===
- (Recorded 1959; released 1963. Conductor B. Alexandrov, choirmaster K. Vinogradov, orchestral conductor V. Alexandrov. 11 tracks. Side 1: The Courageous Don Cossacks, Beautiful Moonlit Night (soloist E. Belyaev), Kamarinskaya (balalaika soloist B.S. Feoktistov), Ah Lovely Night (soloist N. Polozkov), You Are Always Beautiful (soloist E. Belyaev), Kalinka (soloist E. Belyaev). Side 2: A Birch Tree Stood in the Meadow, Polyushko Pole, Poem of Ukraine, Annie Laurie, Zaporozhtsi Dance.)

=== Columbia: The Red Army Ensemble Vol 2, 33C1066 ===
- (Released 1964. Conductor B. Alexandrov.)

=== EMI Angel: The Red Army Ensemble Vol.2, S36143. Out of print ===
- (ASIN: B001OOKHCM. Most tracks recorded live in London 1963. Much information on back of sleeve. Release date unknown. Conductor: B. Aleksandrov. Included are: Moscow Thunder, Moonlight, Polyushko Pole, Kamarinskaya, Ukrainian Poem (1956), That Night, Annie Laurie, You Are Always Beautiful, Cossack dance, Kalinka. Soloists include E. Belyaev.)

=== EMI Angel His Master's Voice: The Soviet Army Ensemble, SXLP30062 ===
- (Recorded and/or released 1956. Conductor: V. Alexandrov; choirmaster K. Vinogradov; musical director V. Alexandrov. Tracks include: Song of Youth, A Birch Tree In A Field Did Stand (soloist I. Didenko), Far Away (soloist E. Belyaev), Song of the Volga Boatmen (soloist A. Eisen), You Are Always Beautiful (soloist E. Belyaev), Along Peterskaya Street (soloist A. Sergeev), It's a Long Way to Tipperary (soloist K. Gerasimov), Kalinka, Bandura, Oh No John, Snow Flakes, Ukrainian Poem, Soldiers' Chorus.)

=== Melodiya: The Ensemble's 50th Anniversary set of 2 LPs, 33C60-11207-10. Out of print ===
- (Recorded 1978. Soloists include Evgeny Belyaev, Stanislav I. Frolov and Alexei T. Sergeev. Included are: Nightingale, Kalinka).

=== Melodiya: 50th Anniversary set of 2 LPs, 33C20-08027-30, Out of print ===
- (Recorded 1978. Conductor B. Aleksandrov. Soloists include I.S. Bukreev. Tank, Oh You Rye, Let's Go!, Soldier's chorus from the opera Faust, Nightingale (soloist E. Belyaev), Kalinka, Song of Youth, Crane, extract from Dubinushka (soloist A.T. Sergeev), Along the Peterskaya Road.)

=== Melodiya: 60th Anniversary 2-LP set, C60-08163-6, Out of print ===
- (Released ca.1977, 60yrs after 1917. Conductor B. Alexandrov. Included are: Polyushko Pole, Sacred War (Svyaschennaya Voyna), Nightingale (soloist E. Belyaev), Victory (soloist V. L. Ruslanov), Kalinka, Road of the Soldiers (duet I. S. Bukreev and E. M. Labkovsky), Dark Eyes (soloist L. M. Kharitonov), Heart of the Sailor (soloist V. I. Anisimov), Song of Russia (soloist B. Shapenko), Crane, Catalina (soloist E. M. Belyaev), Dance Dance (soloist V. L. Ruslanov), Let's Join the Army (duet I. S. Bukreev and P. D. Bogachev).)

=== Melodiya: The Alexandrov Song and Dance Ensemble C-01235-6, Out of print ===
- (Conductor B. Aleksandrov. Soloists include I.I. Savchuk and G.P. Vinogradov. Included are: Stenka Razin, Kalinka, Bandura, The Birch, Moonlight, The Elm and the Oak, Hey Girl (soloist E.M. Belyaev).)

=== Melodiya: Red Banner, the Soviet Army, Apeksans Androva ===
- (In Polish. Release date unknown. ASIN: B001RH5N2K. Ten songs; five on each side.)

=== Melodiya: The Alexandrov Ensemble, Stenka Razin and other famous Russian folk songs, OS 2140 ===
- (Release date unknown.)

=== Melodiya: Alexandrov Song and Dance Ensemble of the Soviet Army, CM 02873-4 ===
- (Release date unknown. Conductor B. Alexandrov.)

=== Saga: The Alexandrov Ensemble, EROS8066 ===
- (Soloists include Ivan Skobtsov, Baritone. Included are: I see a Village, Uncle Nimra, Little Onion.)

=== Sounds Superb/Music For Pleasure: Cossack Patrol, SPR 90022 ===
- Printed 1966 (12 tracks including: Cossack Patrol, The Cliff, Evening On The Roadstead, The Sun Has Set Behind The Hill, You Are Ever Lovely and John Reed Walks In Petrograd.)

=== Sounds Superb/Music For Pleasure: The Red Army Choir Conducted by Alexandrov, MFP 2089 ===
- (Release date unknown)

=== Supraphon: Alexandrov Song and Dance Ensemble, SUA-ST51182 or SUA 11182, Out of print ===
- (Recorded ca.1960. Conductor B. Aleksandrov. Czech label. Included are: Moonlight, Song of Youth, Song of Russia, Sing Soldier! (soloist E.M. Belyaev), Let's Go!.)

=== Vox: Red Army Ensemble ===
- (Release date unknown. ASIN: B001BMHL26)

=== Vox: Red Army Ensemble, STPL 515.090 ===
- (Released 1960s, conductor B. Alexandrov. Stereo. Included are: Song of the Volga Boatmen, Troika, Polyushko Pole, Doubinouchka, They are Valiant, Seven Sons-in-Law, Soviet National Anthem, Song of the Prisoner, Under the Oak Tree, Nightingales, Sing Soldier.)

== 78s ==
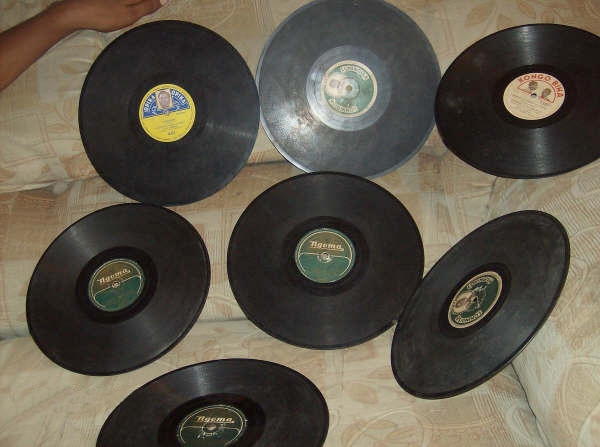
78 rpm shellac phonograph records.

=== ASCH-Stinson: From Border to Border and The Young Birch Tree, ASCH3011 ===
- (Release date unknown. Soloist is Pankov. 10-inch Stinson.)

=== Melodiya: Soldier Always a Soldier, 0-30 ===
- (Release date unknown. A-side has Soldier Always a Soldier; B-side has unknown song. 10-inch. Conductor A.V. Alexandrov. Soloist E. Belyaev.)

=== Le Chant du Monde: Choeurs de L'Armée Rouge: Bandoura, 614 ===
- (Release date unknown. The song Bandura: half on each side. Conducted by A. Alexandrov. The soloist is G. Vinogradov.)

=== Le Chant du Monde: Polyushko Pole and Les Partisans, 620 ===
- (Release date unknown. 10-inch. Conducted by Professeur Alexandrov.)

=== Columbia: Song of the plains or Polyushko Pole Cornet solo: M.K.Lemechko, CL 6335. Disk C-10002 ===
- (Release date thought to be 1937, Paris World Fair. Canadian pressing, recorded in France, with the Choir of the Red Army of the U.S.S.R. The B side is: The White Whirlwind, a folk song, tenor solo: M.Pankov, CL 6338. Director A.V. Alexandrov.)

=== Unknown label: Famous Red Army Songs, 2-record set ===
- (Release date unknown. Conductor A. Alexandrov. Tracks include: Polyushko Pole, The Young Birch Tree, My Moscow.)

=== USSR, Aprelevsky Plant LPs: Cold Waves Lapping (Varyag), B-20753-4 ===
- (Released 1951. Soloist V.I. Nikitin. Conductor A. Alexandrov. One song split between A and B side.)

=== USSR, Aprelevsky Plant LPs: Down by Mother Volga and Storm Revel, B- 9504-8 ===
- (Released 1939. Tracks: A: Down by Mother Volga (arr. A. Alexandrov; soloist V.I. Nikitin); B: Storm Revel (soloist Petrov).)

=== USSR, Aprelevsky Plant LPs: You Will Come Up, Red Sun and Oh, Yes You, Kalinushka, B- 8995-9 ===
- (Released 1939. Tracks: A: You will come up, the Red Sun (soloist F. Kuznetsov); B: Oh, Yes You, Kalinushka (duet: AV Shilov, AV Nikitin). NB: F. Kuznetsov could be identical with I. Kuznetsov.)

== Other formats ==
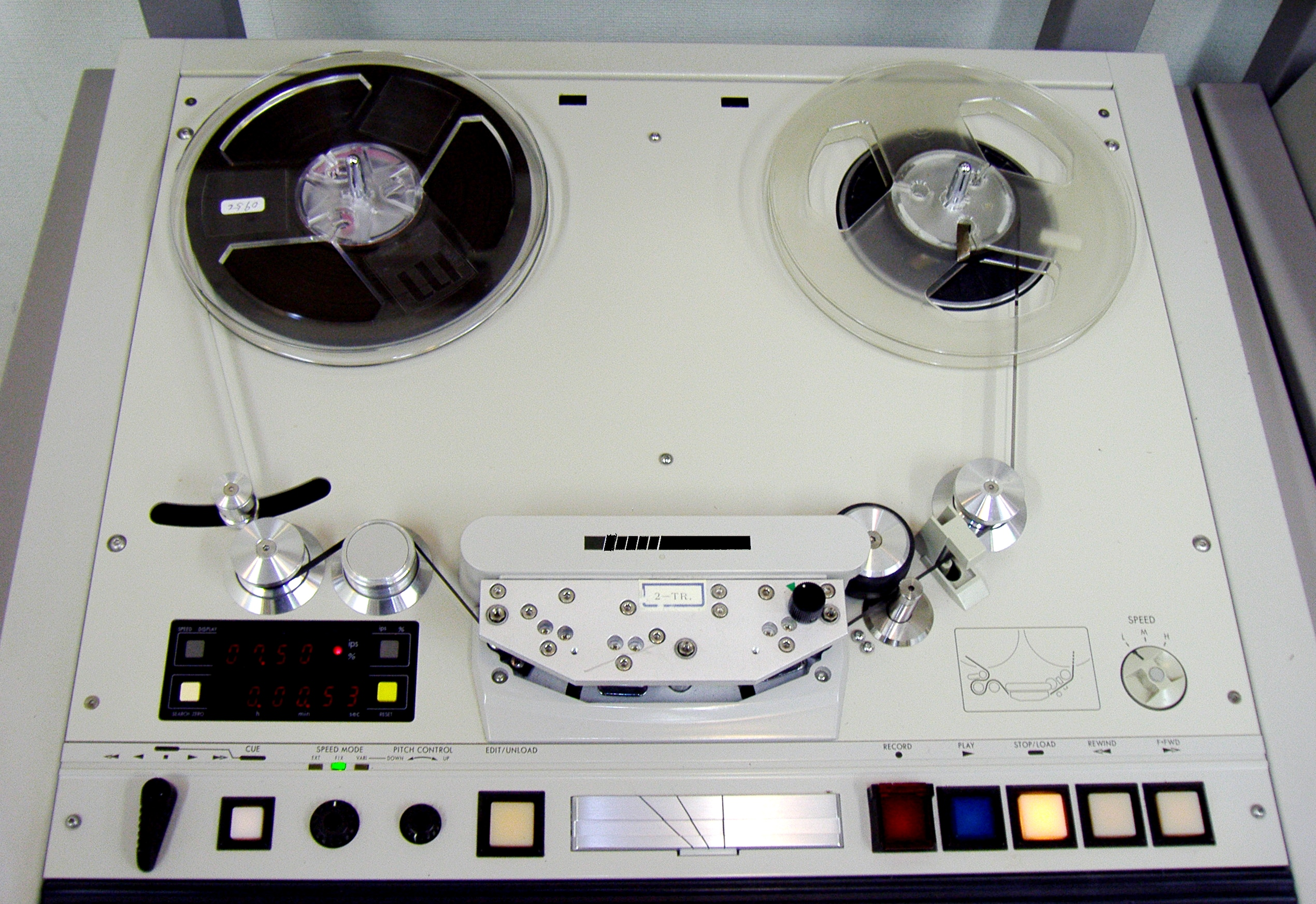
1950s open reel audio tape recorder

=== Magnetic tapes ===
==== Unknown label: Soviet Army Chorus & Band ====
- A Soviet Army Chorus & Band compilation of 1956 recordings was released in the 1960s, with a photo of soldiers on the box. It included Kalinka (soloist: E. Belyaev), You Are Always Beautiful, It's a Long Way to Tipperary and Polyushko Pole (My Fields or Meadowland).

==== EMI Angel: The Red Army Ensemble Vol.2, ZS-36143. Out of print ====
- (Most tracks recorded live at the Abbey Road Studios, London in February and March 1963. Release date unknown. Conductor: B. Aleksandrov; choirmaster K. Vinogradov; orchestral conductor V. Alexandrov. Stereo tape 7.5ips; 4-track. Information on the back of the box tells that there were more than 80 in the choir, and that 1963 live performances were at the Royal Albert Hall and in provincial cities. Songs listed on the box are: The Courageous Don Cossacks (traditional), Lovely Moonlit Night (Ukrainian folk song; soloist E. Belyaev), Kamarinskaya (soloist B.S. Feoktistov), Ah Lovely Night (soloist N. Polozkov), You Are Always Beautiful (soloist E. Belyaev), Kalinka (soloist E. Belyaev), A Birch Tree in a Field Did Stand (Beryozonka) (soloist I. Didenko), Song of the Plains or Meadowland (Polyushko Pole), Ukrainian Poem (soloist A. Sergeev), Annie Laurie (soloist E. Belyaev), Zaparozhtsi Dance (Soldiers' Dance) (music B. Alexandrov).)

== See also ==
- Alexandrov Ensemble
- Alexandrov Ensemble choir
- Alexandrov Ensemble soloists
- Evgeny Belyaev
- Georgi Pavlovich Vinogradov
- Leonid Kharitonov
