= Alexandrov Ensemble choir =

Choir of Alexandrov Ensemble

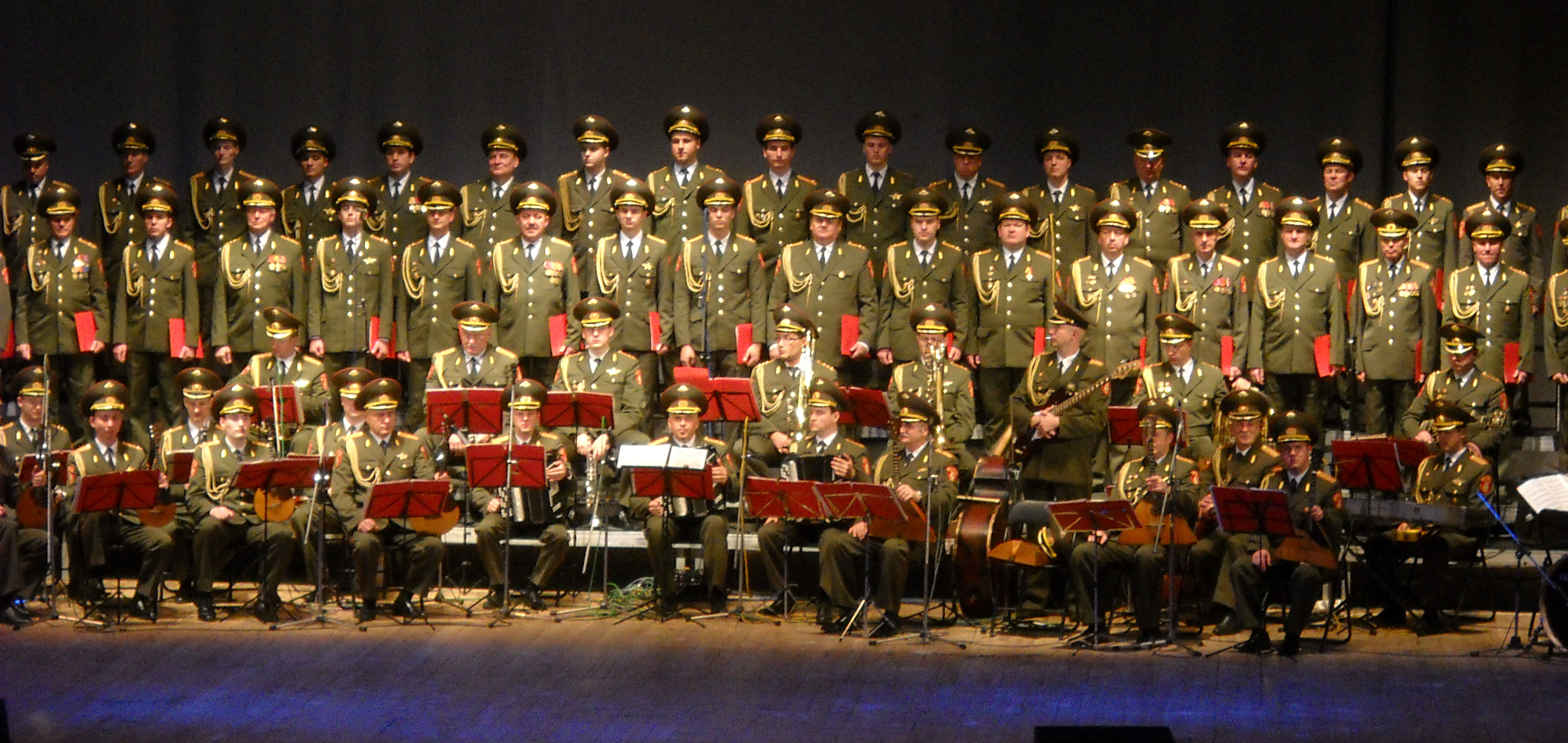
The Choir performs in Warsaw, 2009

The Alexandrov Ensemble choir (established Moscow 1926) is the choir of the Alexandrov Ensemble.

It has for most of its history been a male-voice choir of tenors and basses, based in Moscow and directed and conducted by Alexander V. Alexandrov from 1926 to 1946, by his son Boris A. Alexandrov from 1946 to 1987, and by various directors up to the present. It has always consisted of Soviet and then Russian Red Army personnel, and has been held to represent that army at home and abroad. Since the 1990s, female army personnel have occasionally been included in the choir as sopranos. Since 2007 boy sopranos and altos from the associated choir school have joined the choir for some of the time.

On December 25, 2016, a plane containing 92 people, including over 60 members of the choir, crashed while en route to Latakia, Syria.

== The central importance of the choir ==
Before he died in 1946, Alexander Alexandrov made it clear to his son Boris that the choir was central to the Alexandrov Ensemble, and that without the choir there would be no Ensemble. There are several possible reasons for this:

- It represents the army and the people: from the start, the choir has represented not only the Red Army but also, in the early days, the Soviet Union's socialist ethos. To the audience – when the choir is 80-strong – it can sound like the voice of the masses. So the orchestra, soloists and dance troupe alone could not be seen to be representative in the same way.
- It allows a full range of genres in performance: in the Soviet era, the Alexandrov Ensemble represented the Soviet Union's musical culture at home and abroad. Alexander Alexandrov had to compose and arrange songs in a variety of musical styles, from folk song and popular music to opera and oratorio. Popular music in his day (1920s–1940s) could involve a choir, but opera and oratorio need a choir or chorus, if the full range of composition, arrangement and performance is to be allowed.
- It showcases the singing stars: in the Ensemble, the soloist singers are the stars who are named on recordings, as they are the only personnel to be given solos for the length of a song or act. However, without the Alexandrovs' showmanship via choral arrangement to provide a framework and showcase for these soloists, there would be no stars. A fine example of this would be the choral arrangement which complements Stanislav Frolov singing Song of the Dnieper (Russian: Песня о Днепре).

== Compositions and arrangements for the choir ==
In an ideal world any composer, considering arrangements on such a grand scale as many of those recorded by the Alexandrov Ensemble, might reasonably demand the full set of basses, tenors, altos and sopranos, to allow the full range of tonal effects. Alexander Alexandrov, its first director, began his training at Kazan Cathedral, St. Petersburg, which no doubt had a choir with the full vocal range.

=== The male-voice choir ===
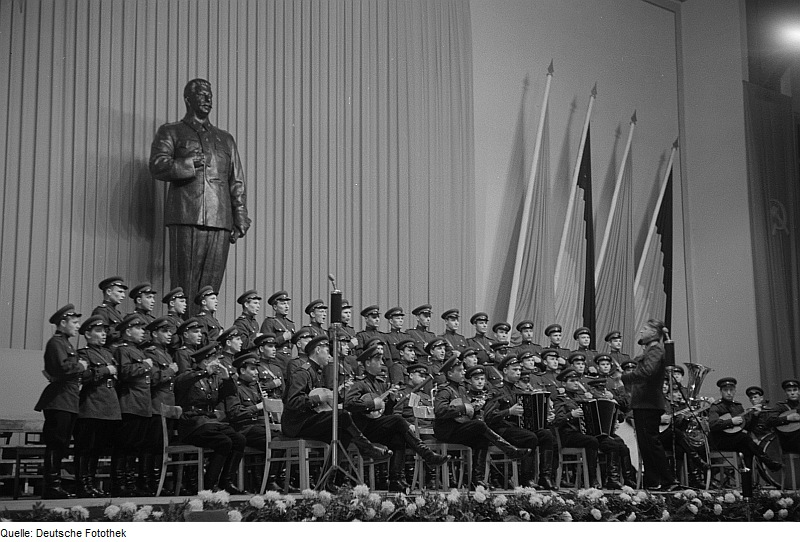
The choir in 1952

However, for most of its history, the choir has consisted only of basses and tenors. Alexander Alexandrov several times applied to his superiors for permission to include boy singers, but was refused. There are several possible reasons for this refusal:

- The budget was limited or controlled: as a Red Army choir, its budget – however bountiful in its 1950s/1960s heyday – possibly covered the wages and expenses of army personnel only, and perhaps any extras had to be justified within army regulations.
- Choirboys cannot join wartime tours: during World War II the primary role of the Ensemble was to entertain troops and to keep up morale in war-torn areas: hardly an acceptable environment for young boys.
- Female carers for choirboys on tour could mean scandal: Being representative of the USSR at home and abroad, the Ensemble carried the burden of USSR public morality, which was carefully controlled. Taking choirboys on tour abroad would have necessitated taking female carers too, and rumours of personnel behaving inappropriately on tour could destroy musical careers.

There are also several positive reasons for a male-voice choir in this Ensemble, especially in those decades when it was establishing its identity at home and abroad:

- If the choir represented the Red Army, then it should look like the army, and that excluded choirboys.
- Limited choices give the Ensemble a unique character. When a composer is faced by limited choices, this can introduce discipline and tension into his compositions, and great art can feed off such tensions. Limited choices can give compositions identity and character. The lusty voices of 80 highly trained Russians with their characteristically Slavonic vowel production aided by the soft palate, and the choir's impressive dynamic and tonal control, already makes the Ensemble choir like no other to the Western ear. Where missing top notes of stretched and extended chords are compensated for by balalaikas, bayans (and perhaps a few countertenors), the choir acquires an extraordinary quality which makes it unique.

Thus, during the Ensemble's second tour to the United Kingdom in 1963, The Times reviewer shows his astonishment at his first experience of this choir:

"What Verdi would have thought of the full-throated chorus from Ernani with an orchestral accompaniment consisting largely of balalaikas and accordions is worthy of contemplation."

– and at the same time he declares: "Their singing and dancing is of a spectacularly high standard".

=== Composition of the choir ===
In the early 1950s a typical full division (which varied from song to song) was as follows: (1) countertenors; (2) first tenors; (3) second tenors; (4) baritones; (5) first bass; (6) second bass; (7) basso profundos. It was of course a great luxury for B. A. Alexandrov to be able to do this, but the Ensemble numbered 475 people including 220 in the choir before the mid-1950s. They all used to go on tour abroad worldwide at the beginning. But in 1955 Krushchev decided to cut the choir to 80 people and prohibited them to go on tour to capitalist countries from that date; only to domestic tours and visits to the Warsaw Pact countries, as well as to countries with strong relations with the USSR.

=== The size of the choir ===
The choir appears to function most successfully with a minimum of 80 singers. Most of the films and photographs of the Ensemble in its heyday, including the 1948 Berlin Peace Concert, and during the directorship of Boris Alexandrov, show a choir of at least 80 singers. This size allows the characteristic massed-voices effect of the Ensemble, plus the opportunity for the composer or arranger to score for several parts, in both bass and tenor sections. For example, in Song of the Dnieper, a basso profondo line suddenly appears in the chorus two-thirds of the way through, giving a powerful effect.

By contrast, during the UK 1988 tour, the Ensemble had a choir of up to 36. Professionalism and the characteristic discipline of the Ensemble maintained good performance standards, but the small choir lacked the powerful, massed-voiced sound that its audience remembered from 1956 and 1963.

== The choral songs ==
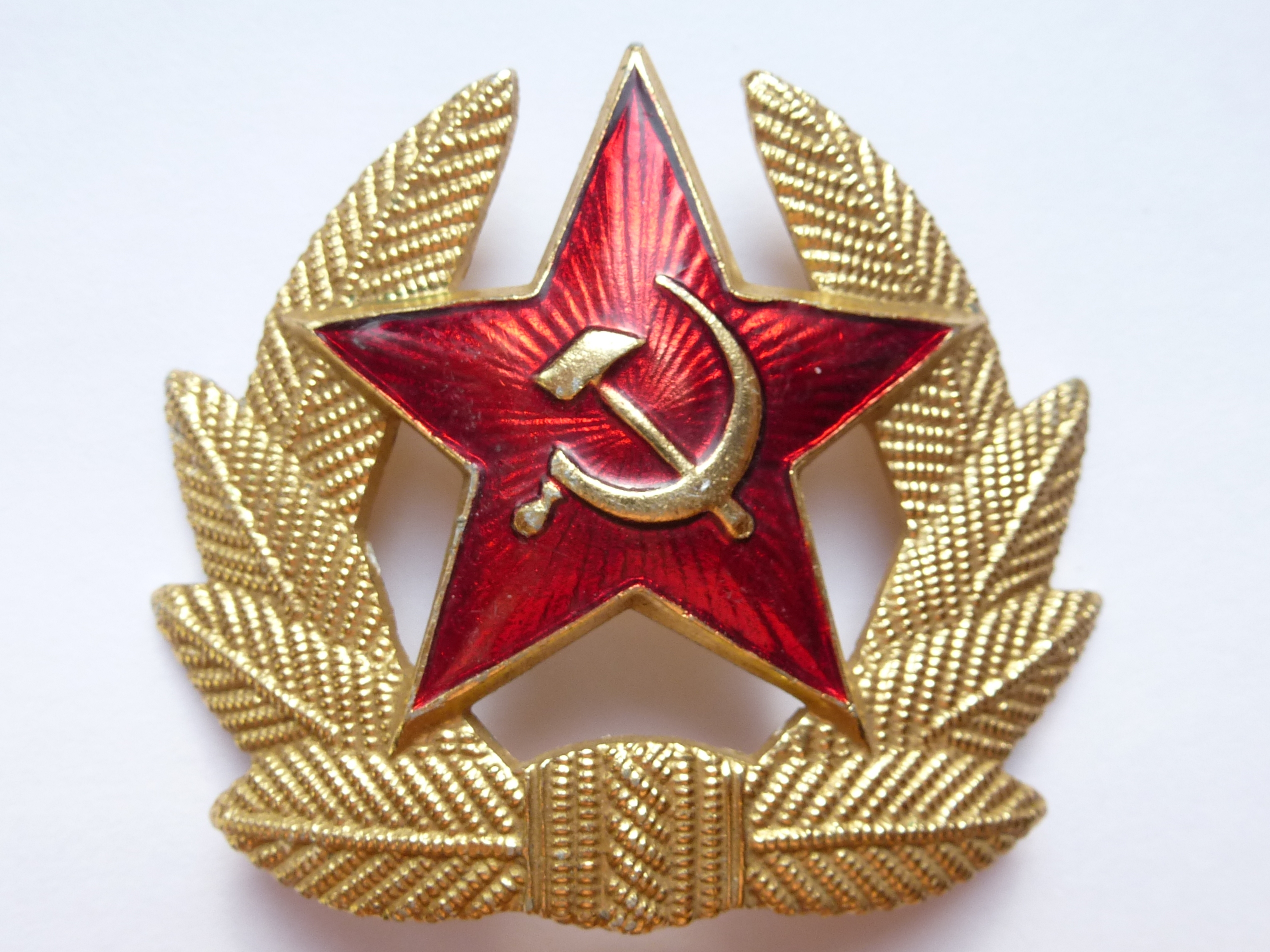
Red Army conscript hat insignia. On some concert tours, imitation cap badges were given away to fans.

Many of these are listed here and here in Russian. Listed below are some of the notable ones. More are listed on the Alexandrov Ensemble discography page.

=== The chorus alone ===
In alphabetical order:

- "En Route" (Russian: В путь) (music V. Soloviev-Sedoy; lyrics M. Dudin). Also translated as "Let's Go" and "On the Way". This is the famous song in which the choir rocks from side to side as if marching. It was a favourite party-trick of Boris Alexandrov's to walk off and leave the Ensemble to perform it un-conducted.
- "In Peace" (Russian: В защиту мира) (music Victor White; lyrics Ilya Frenkel, 1948). A song for peace composed in 1948: possibly one of the compositions sung at the 1948 Berlin Peace Concert.
- "National Anthem of the Soviet Union"^{sample} and National Anthem of Russia: The same music is used for both (with different words), and that music was composed by Alexander V. Alexandrov in 1944.
- "Polyushko Pole" variously translated as "Plaine ma plaine", "Field my field" and "Meadowland" (Russian: Полюшко-поле) (music: L. Knipper; lyrics: Vladimir Gusev). Recorded from 1934 onwards.
- "Song of the Soviet Army" (music: Alexander Alexandrov; lyrics: O. Kolychev). The original 1945 recording is highly triumphal with its brass fanfares and ecstatic chords extended upward with the aid of trumpets, as part of the V-E Day celebrations. That arrangement by A. Alexandrov is very much in the tradition of final choruses in 19th-century Italian grand opera, and shows how he originally envisaged this composition.
- "Svyaschennaya Voyna" or "Sacred War". The music was composed by Alexander V. Alexandrov on June 22, 1941, on the very day when the Wehrmacht invaded the USSR. A. Alexandrov's arrangement of this on the 1941 recording sounds both strikingly modern and movingly painful, with the chords and the percussive rhythm sounding raw and exposed. This was the year of the Battle of Leningrad, and the year when the Alexandrov Ensemble did one of its most gruelling tours through war-torn areas. Later recordings sound more joyful.

=== The chorus with soloists ===
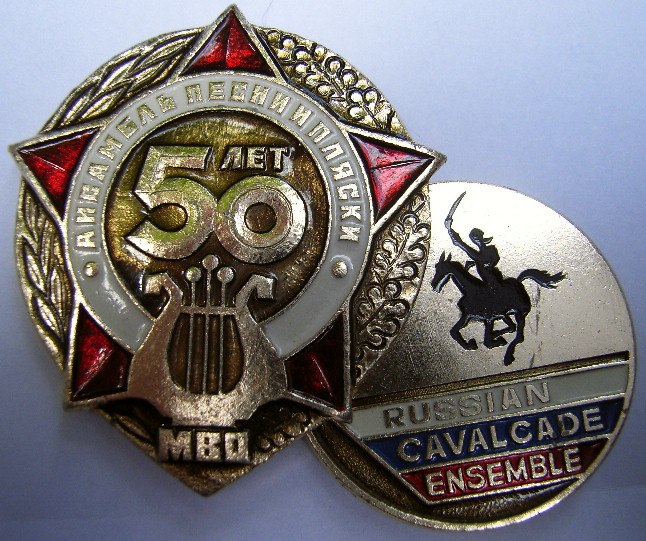
Imitation cap badges given to fans in Leicester at the 1988 UK tour.

In alphabetical order:

- Boundary (Russian: Граница) (music O. Feltsman; lyrics A. Sofronov). An arrangement which takes full advantage of the dramatic effect of a brass solo and extreme dynamic variation in the chorus, to back up two unnamed duettists.
- Song of the Dnieper (Russian: Песня о Днепре) (music M. Fradkin; lyrics E. Dolmatovskaya). A powerful and dramatic arrangement to back up the basso profondo soloist Stanislas Frolov. Massive chords are obtained by stretching the vocal range of the choir well into basso profondo and countertenor ranges, and by creating extended chords which contain the maximum tension, until they are finally resolved at the end.

== See also ==
- Alexandrov Ensemble
- Alexandrov Ensemble soloists
- Alexandrov Ensemble discography
- Evgeny Belyaev
- Georgi Pavlovich Vinogradov
