= Georgy Vinogradov =

Russian radio and concert singer (1908–1980)

Background information
- Born: 16 November 1908; Kazan, Russian Empire
- Origin: Kazan, Russian Empire
- Died: 12 November 1980 (aged 71) Moscow, Soviet Union
- Genres: Opera, Romantic music, lieder, military music, ethnic Russian music, folk music, 1940s popular music,
- Occupations: All-Union Radio and Radio Moscow singer; Alexandrov Ensemble soloist
- Years active: 1937–1951
- Labels: Originally: USSR Aprelevsky Plant; Melodiya. Re-releases: The Eastern Front, Melodiya, Le Chant du Monde

Georgy Pavlovich Vinogradov (Note: Georgy Pavlovich Vinogradov: Russian: Гео́ргий Па́влович Виногра́дов, IPA: [ɡʲɪˈorɡʲɪj ˈpavləvʲɪtɕ vʲɪnɐˈɡradəf]) (16 November [O.S. 3 November] 1908 – 12 November 1980) was a Soviet and Russian tenor: a popular World War II singer on Radio Moscow, recording artist, and soloist with the Alexandrov Ensemble. Honored Artist of the RSFSR (1949).

== Musical training ==
Vinogradov was born in Kazan in 1908. At first he belonged to the church choir and the railroad workers' drama club in Kazan. Then, while studying engineering, he also studied violin and viola at the Kazan State Conservatory (Kazan School of Music or Eastern Music College), and in the 1930s was a student at the Military Academy of Communications, Moscow. He took singing lessons and performed in amateur concerts at the same time, besides broadcasting on All-Union Radio. He left the academy in 1936, six months before completing his studies.

== Musical development ==
As a native of Kazan, he was taken in by the Kazan Opera Studio in 1937, and in the same year he became a soloist of Gosdzhaza USSR, directed by W. Knushevitsky and G. M. Blanter. This led to three successful recordings: "Two to Tango", "My Happiness" and "Love". He completed his musical studies at the Moscow Conservatory.

In June 1941, he attended the recruitment office to sign up as an ordinary soldier, but was instructed to join those soldiers who entertained the troops at the front. Vinogradov said:

I just wore uniform in the first days of war. Then I was put into an ad hoc entertainment team, which included the orchestra, under the management of B. Knushevitsky and several soloists. We served at the Front, entertaining the fighters who had just left the battle. On one occasion we were under fire, the floor collapsed, and we were left with a team of only 11 people, but the group re-established. In blockaded Leningrad, in a group with Ruslanova, Garkavi and other famous artists, we performed about a thousand concerts. In 1943 I was transferred to serve in the Red Song and Dance Ensemble of the Soviet Army. I was with them until the end of the war ...

When he performed on the All-Union Radio channel he was heard by the vocal instructor Mikhail Lvovich Lvov. Lvov is credited with making Vinogradov into a professional singer – with lessons in diction, breathing, flexibility, and finally in producing the sound he became famous for. Later studies were with Valeria Vladimirovna Barsova, a Bolshoi Opera soprano with whom he also made two duet recordings. On the radio, Vinogradov sang a wide range of material from jazz to art songs; in World War II he sang with the USSR Committee of Defense Model Orchestra.

== Singing career 1937–1951 ==
Vinogradov was engaged as a Soviet national radio soloist, and between 1943 and 1951 was a soloist with the Alexandrov Ensemble, the Soviet Army's official army chorus and song and dance ensemble conducted by Alexander Vasilyevich Alexandrov. He became an Honored Artist of the RSFSR in 1949. After that, he became a soloist with Radio Moscow (later known as the Voice of Russia).

With the Alexandrov Ensemble he recorded "Two Maxims" (recorded 1943), "Oh the Road", "In a Forest at the Front" (recorded 1945), "Nightingales" (recorded 1950), "Dark Night" (recorded 1945). In the 1940s he also recorded "Nightingale" as a duet with the baritone Vladimir Bunchikov, and "The Bending Branch" (or "Luchina") as a solo with the Alexandrov Ensemble.

Vinogradov never performed on the opera stage (and he never joined an opera company), but he participated in many radio performances including Don Giovanni, Manon, Mignon, and numerous Russian operas.

His tenor voice has been described as one of effortless and pure poetic beauty, with flawless diction and phrasing.

Another critic described his voice as being infused with an "indescribably poetic beauty". However it has been suggested that he was primarily a radio singer because his voice lacked the power of a true lyric tenor to sing above a full choir and orchestra.

He made a large number of recordings. Two notable sets, recorded around 1950, are the Liederkreis or song cycles, Schumann's Dichterliebe and Schubert's Die schöne Müllerin; they were sung in Russian. The accompanist on the recordings was Georg Orentlicher (Russian: Георг Борисович Орентлихер), who later in old age became professor of chamber and vocal accompaniment at the Gnessin State Musical College in Moscow in the late 1960s and early 1970s.

== The end of his singing career ==
In 1951 there was apparently a bar-room brawl, possibly with Polish officers or officials, which embarrassed the Soviet government, and finished his career.

Officially he kept singing until 1963, but there is no record of his activities and official records from the 1950s and 1960s virtually ignore him. – Review by Robert Hugill.

Another version of this story has it that apparently his glory gave him too much importance, and in 1951 with the phrase "For breach of discipline in the tours" Vinogradov was removed from the concerts. He never recorded or performed publicly again, though he was only 43 years old. In later years he taught in the Russian art studio of popular art VTMEI. Among his students was the tenor Gennady Stone. Vinogradov died in Moscow. His colleague Leonid Kharitonov remembers the following, which contradicts the above rumors:

Vinogradov left the Ensemble in 1951 and started his own career as a soloist with RosKoncert's philharmonic department. This organization was responsible for distributing its artists on tours throughout Russia, and salary payment was donated by the government. There was no private business in Russia until 1987.

== Private life ==
Vinogradov had a relationship with the ballerina Virskaya from the Ensemble in the 1940s, and had a daughter Ksenia.

== Discography ==
Vinogradov left a considerable discography of arias, song cycles, and popular music – with the bulk, 125 items, released originally on Melodiya. Below is a small selection of his recordings, including some current re-releases.

- 78 rpm: Le Chant du Monde: Choeurs de L'Armee Rouge: Bandoura, 614. Out of print.
  - (Release date unknown. The song "Bandura": half on each side. Conducted by Alexandrov. The soloist is Georgy Vinogradov.)
- LP, 33rpm: Melodiya: The Alexandrov Song and Dance Ensemble C-01235-6, Out of print.
  - (Conductor Boris Alexandrov. Soloists include G.P. Vinogradov who sings one or more of the following: "Stenka Razin", "Kalinka", "Bandura", "The Birch", "Moonlight", "The Elm and the Oak")
- CD: Melodiya: Sacred War (in Russian), MELCD60-00938/1
  - (Compiled and released 2005, for the 60th anniversary of 1945. Military songs. ASIN: B000P3TD5U.)
    - "Two Maxims" (Russian: Два Максима) (soloist Georgi Vinogradov)
    - "Oh the Road" (Russian: Эх, дороги) (soloist Georgi Vinogradov)
- CD: The Eastern Front: Letters from the Front, Front 003
  - (Compilation of original recordings alternating with modern atmospheric artworks, released 9 May 2006 "to celebrate the 61st Anniversary of Great Victory in WWII". Dedicated to Soviet fighters and their allies in World War II. Sold in a thick A3 paper, folded into a triangle to imitate the triangular-folded World War II servicemen's letters from the Soviet front. A facsimile World War II photo of Soviet servicemen is included. The CD contains a bonus video of the Moscow Victory Parade of 1945. CD in Russian; paper cover in English.)
    - "In a Front Zone Forest" (Georgy Vinogradov, 1945)
    - "Wait for Me" (Georgy Vinogradov, 1942)
    - "Two Maxims" (Georgy Vinogradov, 1942)
- CD: Melodiya: Eh Dorogi, MELCD6000615
  - (Compilation released 2006. Vinogradov recorded 1948–51. In Russian, 75 mins. Included are: Track 3. "Front Line in the Forest" (soloist Georgy Vinogradov); 19. "Katyusha" (soloist Georgy Vinogradov); 20. "Oh Roads" or "Eh Dorogi" (soloist Georgy Vinogradov).)

== See also ==
- Alexandrov Ensemble soloists
- Alexandrov Ensemble discography
- Yevgeny Belyaev
