= Leonid Kharitonov =

Leonid Kharitonov may refer to:

- Leonid Kharitonov (actor) (1930–1987), Soviet actor
- Leonid Kharitonov (singer) (1933–2017), Russian singer
