= Perestroika (video game) =

1990 video game

- Developer: Locis
- Platform: MS-DOS
- Release: 1990
- Genre: Puzzle
- Mode: Single-player

Perestroika (also known as Toppler) is a Soviet video game released in 1990 by a small software developer called Locis (Nikita Skripkin, Aleksander Okrug and Dmitry Chikin, currently - Nikita online) in 1990, and named after Soviet leader Mikhail Gorbachev's policy of Perestroika. The music playing on the title screen is a Russian folk song "Dubinushka" from the 19th century.

== Gameplay ==
The splash screen features a stylized Gorbachev, whose presence causes the Kremlin—the seat of Soviet government—to break apart. The game consists of controlling a small frog-like creature which jumps from one lily pad to another, trying to reach a coin, symbolizing a higher standard of living.

The frog symbolizes a democrat and the lilies, symbolizing the ever-changing laws and acts, constantly shrink and disappear only to appear in other places. The player can collect dots in four colours, blue symbolizing grocery goods; red, currency transactions; yellow, taxes; and brown, business ventures. A currency transaction can sometimes add extra life, a tax reduces the score, and a company can sometimes sink the figure. From the seventh level, the game also features one or more evil creatures called "bureaucrats" which follow the frog and try to eat it. The frog dies if the lily pad on which it is standing disappears, if the player moves it to a place where there is no lily pad, or if it is caught by a bureaucrat.

Perestroika runs under MS-DOS, it was written in Borland C++ using the Borland Graphics Interface and has a resolution of 640×350. It can be run on modern IBM PC compatibles with the emulator DOSBox.

Nikita Online released in 1995 a remake of this game for Windows 3.1x Toppler for Windows, all gameplay remains the same, only on the title screen, instead of Gorbachev, a frog is displayed and the coin to advance to the next level has been replaced by a lily flower.

The frog itself and the second game name (which is mentioned in the file name toppler.exe) may be inspired by the Tower Toppler game.

== Other versions ==
The game exists also in a version for computers ZX Spectrum and compatible. It was programmed by a Czech programmer group GCC under a Czech variant of the name Perestrojka. The producer was a company Proxima - Software, the game was published in 1992 as a part of compilation Mah Jongg.

In 2005, it was released a remake Toppler for Microsoft Windows by the Czech developer René Puschinger, the coin was turned into a yellow star and black bureaucrats were added, which can be eaten.

The a JavaScript version of the game can be played online. There are also several look-alikes in JavaScript and in Flash.

This game also has few remakes for mobile smartphones, e.g. iPhones Perestroika Revival (now unavailable), and for older Android phones Leap frog Toppler.
