= Leonid Kharitonov (singer) =

Russian choir-soloist and concert singer (1933–2017)

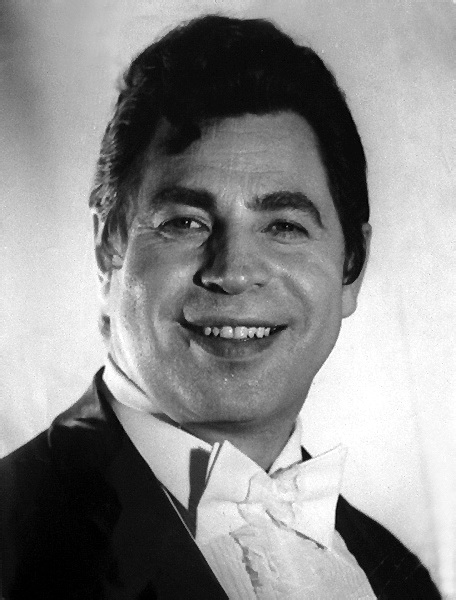
- Kharitonov in the 1970s

Background information
- Born: Leonid Mikhailovich Kharitonov; 18 September 1933; Irkutsk, Russian SFSR, Soviet Union
- Origin: Golumet, Irkutsk, Russia
- Died: 19 September 2017 (aged 84) Moscow, Russia
- Genres: Opera, Romantic music, military music, ethnic Russian music, easy listening, middle of the road, folk music, comic songs
- Occupations: Alexandrov Ensemble soloist, operatic and concert bass-baritone soloist, Soviet Army (private)
- Years active: 1953–2017
- Labels: Kultur, EMI, Melodiya etc.

Leonid Mikhailovich Kharitonov (Russian: Леонид Михайлович Харитонов; 18 September 1933 – 19 September 2017) was a Soviet and Russian bass-baritone (баритональный бас) singer. He was honored with People's Artist of the RSFSR and Honored Artist of RSFSR. In the West he was noted for his 1965 video of The Song of the Volga Boatmen.

== Early life ==
He was born in Golumet, Irkutsk Oblast, in 1933. When his father went missing in World War II, his mother brought him up. Between 1934 and 1942 he was at Cheremkhovo, and attended school number 25 from 1941 to 1942. Back at Golumet he attended school from 1942 to 1945, and stayed at Golumet until 1947. For a year from the age of 14 (from 1947 to 1948) he studied to be a welder in F.Z.O. and worked at a plant in Kuibysheva in the Irkutsk Oblast as a moulder and caster. From 1948 to 1950 back in Golumet again, he worked in M.T.S. as an electric welder, meanwhile beginning to perform as a singer.

From 17 years old (1950/1951) he was a soloist at Irkutsk Philharmonic and finally was accepted by Moscow Conservatory from 1952 to 1955. This was very difficult because as a Siberian he did not even have a matriculation certificate, but his strong singing voice spoke for him.

== Career ==
=== With the Alexandrov Ensemble 1953 to 1972 ===
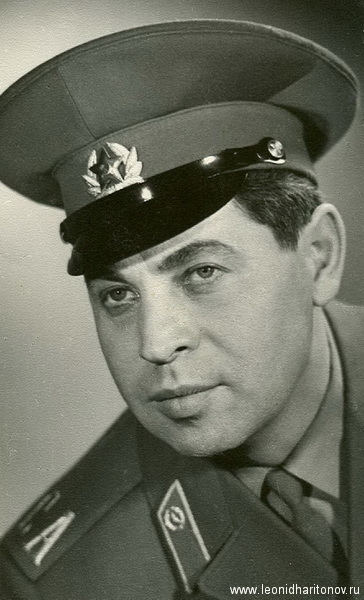
L.M. Kharitonov, 1970s

From 9 November 1953 to March 1965 he was a member of the choir in the Red Song and Dance Ensemble of the Soviet Army (later the Alexandrov Ensemble). His place in the choir was always third from the right in the top row. From 1953 to 1955 he served in both the Red Army and the choir. From 1956 to 1959, while still with the choir, he studied at Gnessin State Musical College. His first unofficial public performance as soloist was in the State Kremlin Palace on 18 March 1965. On that day two good friends of his, cosmonauts Pavel Belyaev and Alexei Leonov, traveled into space on the Voskhod 2. During this mission, Leonov became the first human to walk in space. Kharitonov's first official public performance as a soloist was on 22 April 1965. In 1967 he was awarded Honoured Artist of Russia. He continued with the Ensemble until 1972 - so he was with them for nearly 20 years. B.A. Alexandrov was proud of his soloist, and would often shake his hand or hug him publicly onstage after a performance. Kharitonov sometimes sang duets, but only with Ivan Bukreev. Kharitonov had only one singing teacher in his life: Evgeny Avgustovich Kanger, who taught no-one in the Ensemble but the leading soloists, including Evgeny Belyaev.

=== Independent career from 1972 to 2017 ===
From 1972 to 1998 he was a soloist with the Moscow Philharmonic Society, and in 1986 was awarded People's Artist of the RSFSR. Being a soloist for the Moscow Philharmonic meant that tours were arranged; he was given bookings by them; an accompanist was provided; but he could arrange his own bookings and pay for a different accompanist outside Moscow, and could accept tours offered by his own clients. During this time, he performed frequently on radio and television. On tour, he visited the entire country and appeared several times at the State Kremlin Palace concert hall. He was considered the pride of Russia, and sang at concerts for the government and for foreign delegations. During the 1970s, ’80s and ’90s, Kharitonov went on tour abroad to many different countries, including Czechoslovakia, England, Scotland, the United States, China and Australia. From 1998 to 2006 he performed at various venues on a contract basis, giving concerts in Siberia, the German Embassy and Ilya Glazunov Gallery. He was a friend of Anatoly Solovyanenko but they never sang a duet together. Kharitonov never performed in theatrical opera, but sang operatic arias in concert performances.

=== Worldwide recognition ===
Like many of the great Russian operatic singers of the Soviet era, this bass-baritone singer who was respected in Russia and who sang fully in the tradition of Chaliapin was largely unknown in the West. This is because his career was overshadowed by the Cold War. However his recordings continue to be re-released worldwide, and this may eventually serve to redress the balance, along with the recent increased exposure of Kharitonov on YouTube.

== Critical commentaries on performances 1965 to 1972 ==
=== 1965 video of Cliff ===
Utyos (Russian: Утёс)

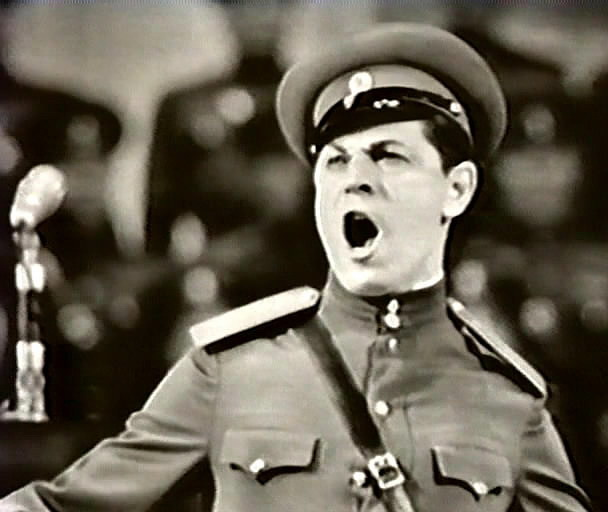
Kharitonov singing Cliff at the Tchaikovsky Hall, Moscow, 1965

One of Kharitonov's first solo performances, at age 32 after twelve years in the choir of the Ensemble, was a concert at the Kremlin Palace of Congresses attended by top government officials. As a chorister he was aware of the primary function of the bass part. Whether the part actually does so or not, its effect is to appear to provide a rhythmic and tonal foundation for the musical piece. In other words, particularly when the choir sings a cappella, or when there are no drums, the bass part appears to set both the rhythm and pitch, by virtue of having the heaviest sound. This understanding, and the understanding within Boris Alexandrov's arrangement, is what makes Kharitonov's performance commanding. There is no destabilising ego here. When he sings he sets the melody and dynamic, and establishes all that is to come; the choir appears to settle comfortably above his voice; the choir repeats and follows his lead. This roars to a climax, with the soloist's voice appearing to carry the weight of all Russia's revolutionary optimism. After all, this is a song about Stenka Razin: the first revolutionary; a cross between Attila the Hun and Robin Hood - and this performance made Leonid Brezhnev cry. The screenshot, left, from a concert given at Tchaikovsky Hall in Moscow during the same time period, is an indication of the stage presence which takes on the persona of Razin himself. Ultimately, this is a recording that demonstrates what a bass soloist really is: the musical foundation of a performance. The sound recording of Cliff can be heard in the 2006 BBC documentary series Chernobyl Nuclear Disaster: Surviving Disaster while brave men swim to their deaths, opening sluice gates below the reactor in the hope of preventing a nuclear explosion.

==== Historical commentary on 1965 performance of Cliff ====
This song is about the fate of the 17th-century Russian rebel, Stepan Razin, its lyrics and music written in 1864 by poet, playwright and novelist Alexander Navrotsky. The song was an anthem for revolutionaries of the late 19th and early 20th century in Russia; Lenin often sang it with his comrades-in-arms. The song is still culturally central to Russia. Kharitonov remembered:

"My solo career truly began with a concert in the Kremlin Palace of Congresses on April 22, 1965, dedicated to the 95th anniversary of Lenin, when I sang "There is a cliff on the Volga." This was my first solo performance. Brezhnev wept. He got up from his seat and wiped away the tears with his hands then applauded, and then everyone in the room stood up as well and applauded too. I do not know what my performance stirred in the hearts of Leonid Ilyich and the other listeners, but I would like this song to be considered a monument to the Russian victorious spirit. After that performance, I continued to be a soloist with the Ensemble for seven years, and, from then on, I was regarded as a serious professional singer among the musical and political elite".

"I remember how after the concert Marshal Voroshilov came to see me backstage. After expressions of gratitude he hugged me as a father would and told me that Stalin also considered this song to be his favorite, and often played a record of it being performed by A. Pirogov, whenever he was sad at heart. "If Stalin were alive, then you would be leaving this room as a People's Artist of the USSR - because you sing it better than Pirogov," Voroshilov told me."

=== 1969 video of Dark-Eyed Cossack Girl ===
Chernoglazaya Kazachka (Russian: Черноглазая казачка)

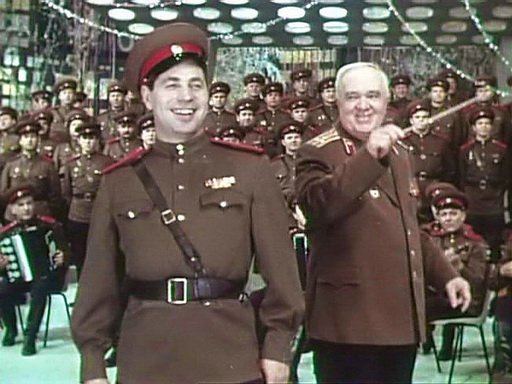
Kharitonov performing "Dark Eyed Cossack Girl", and a rare image of Boris Alexandrov laughing

Many Russian songs are serious or sad, but Kharitonov also performed comic songs or arias. The composer Matvey Blanter wrote Dark-Eyed Cossack Girl (Russian: Черноглазая казачка) especially for him in 1966. Kharitonov's definitive performance was recorded in 1969. Again he is celebrating Chaliapin's legacy as the first modern bass to successfully fuse drama — and humour — with pure musical technique, as in Chaliapin's performance of Dark Eyes. Moreover, this performance of Kharitonov's demonstrates the Ensemble's style, which in the era of A.V. and B.A. Alexandrov encouraged soloists to stay in tune in spite of any vibrato, any emotional acting, or any humour. Therefore, although the song involves laughter, he laughs elegantly in tune. All the while he is making faces and humorous gestures, his vocal tone and pitch remain spot-on. That is the achievement of this kind of performance: while the audience and the other musicians laugh so much at Kharitonov's clowning (see image, left), at the same time they are aware of highly disciplined singing, and the performance remains perfectly musical.

This performance demonstrates that discipline is fundamental to musical elegance.

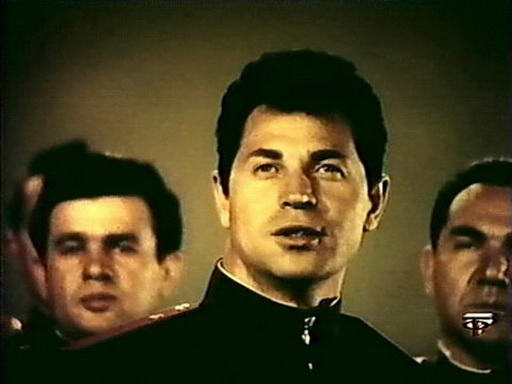
Kharitonov singing Ej, Uhnem, 1965

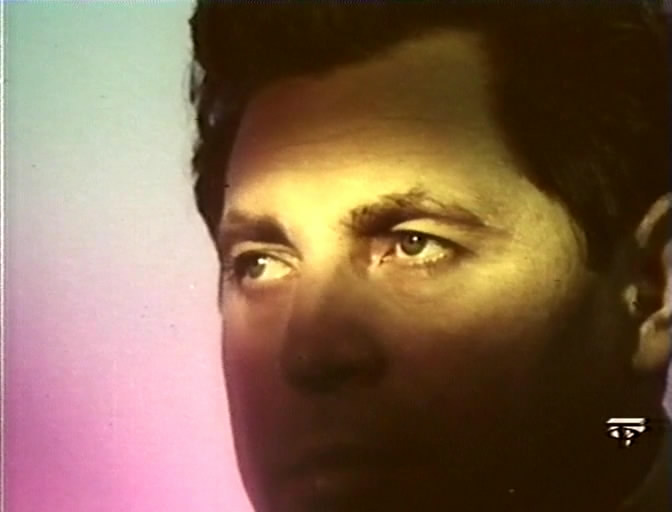
Leonid Kharitonov singing Gori Gori (Shine shine my star) on television, 1974

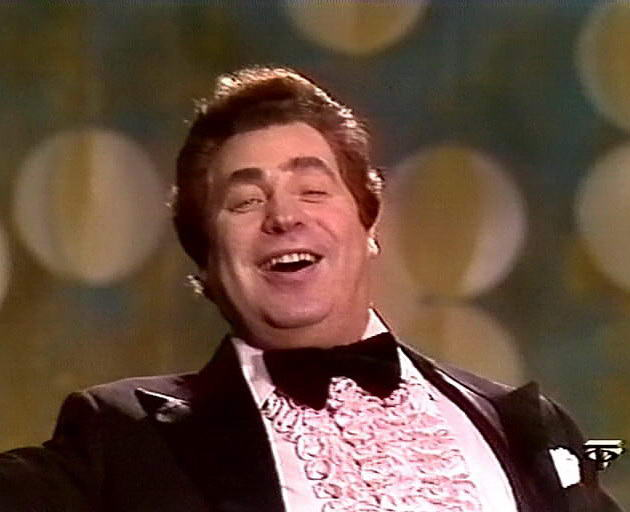
Kharitonov singing Along the Peterskaya, 1983

== Reviews ==
- "There are eight solo singers whose range of songs is as wide as the convention allows — Leonid Kharitonov chose Di quella pira as an encore and sang it magnificently — who sing well and dispense encores lavishly, dropping charmingly into English now and again." - The Times review of the Ensemble's 1967 UK tour
- "Newly promoted from the ranks of the choir to that of soloist, Leonid Kharitonov sternly leads his voice into chasms of dizzying depth, displaying an impressively full sonorousness." - L’Aurore review of the Ensemble's 1967 French tour
- "Leonid Kharitonov was a great success on his visit to Britain in 1967 with his rendition of the Volga Boat Song. Siberian born Kharitonov is now a soloist with the Moscow State Philharmonic Society specializing in traditional Russian songs." - Soviet Weekly review of UK tour, 1977
- "...They were rehearsing in every corner of Hamilton Town Hall. Leonid Kharitonov is the group’s bass soloist. Built like the side of a house, with a voice to match. Like the rest of the troupe he’s a Burns fanatic. They can put most Scots to shame with Rabbie’s songs and poems – in Russian. During his first performance at the Usher Hall, Leonid astonished the audience by sweeping the microphone aside and filling the hall to the echo with his naked voice." - Sunday Post review of his Scottish tour, 1977
- "The Russian opera singer Leonid Kharitonov, accompanied by the rhythm sections, sang songs such as I’m looking at the sky, Along Peterskaya Street and Pies with cheese. His last song had the crowd laughing, as he staggered out onto the stage as if he was drunk, making faces and losing his balance as he sang to the audience.... The audience rose to its feet to honor Kharitonov with a rousing ovation in tribute to his art." - Yorkton this week, tour review, 1979
- "...The same can be said about the presentation of another remarkable singer — People's Artist of Russia Leonid Kharitonov. An enchanting bass and an amazing dramatic actor in one person, he led his audience to a magical space of Russian and world musical classics...." - Moscow Magazine (Russian: Журнал "Москва"), performance review, 2001
- "Performances by Kharitonov at the most prestigious venues in dozens of countries around the world raised a new wave of interest in the culture of Russian songs. In France, he performed at the invitation of President Charles de Gaulle, at a charity concert of stars of the world, held to benefit less developed countries (December 1967.) Competing with such world celebrities as Franco Corelli, Fernandel, Nicolai Ghiaurov, and the Beatles, Kharitonov received the title of Best Singer of the Year." - Russian Messenger (Russian: Русский Вестник), interview and review, 2003
- "When we were at his concert at the Irkutsk Philharmonic Organ Hall, we just sat there with opened mouths — so beautifully he sings. And what a powerful voice! Leonid sang without a microphone, but even those who sat in the back rows could hear every word so clearly as if he were not on stage, but standing right next to them." - Kopeck (Russian: Копейка), performance review, 2006
- "I am very grateful to Leonid Kharitonov, a remarkable bass, soloist of the Moscow Philharmonic Society, with whom I first went on tour. He asked me to tell the audience a short informational story about him in the beginning of the performance. He was not just a singer, but also a wonderful actor. And naturally so. After our first concert he said to me: "I watched the hall when you were speaking. The man in the front row looked at his watch three times. Evidently, he was not interested." This was the main lesson: I must speak in a way that the audience was so interested that they were afraid to miss something from my story. Hence, it is not only the information itself that's important, but also how you impart it." - Moscow Truth (Russian: Московская Правда), interview, 2006

== Private life ==
Leonid Kharitonov had two sons, and was based in Moscow during his long career. In 2008 he was involved in returning an icon of Saint Nicholas to the Church of Saint Nicholas in his home town of Golumet.

On 25 September 2017 his son, Mikhail Kharitonov, posted the following upon the website that Leonid Kharitonov managed with him:

I have a very sad news for all the admirers of the famous Russian operatic singer. Leonid Mikhailovich Kharitonov died on 19 September 2017, after suffering his 5th heart attack. This happened the next day after his 84th birthday.

Following the post was what was described as one of Leonid Kharitonov's favourite songs, Shine, Shine my Star, with a farewell to him as a father and as a singer.

== Recorded music ==
=== With the Alexandrov Ensemble ===
With the Alexandrov Ensemble he recorded The Ballad about Russian Boys (music: Novikov; lyrics: Oshanin L.), John Reed Walks Around Petrograd (music: Novikov; lyrics: M. Vershinin), War isn't Over Yet (music: B. Muradeli; lyrics: M. Andronov), Here Lenin Lived (music: B. Terentiev; lyrics: A. Fatyanov), Lenin's Guard (music: B Aleksandrov; lyrics: M Khotimsk), My Fatherland (music: O. Feltsman; lyrics: Oshanin L.), Veterans don't Grow Old in their Souls (music: Tulika S.; lyrics: Y. Belinsky), Song of Peace (music: B. Muradeli; lyrics: V. Kharitonov), Gray Hair (music: A. Ekimyan; lyrics: F. Laube), Son of the Fatherland (music: S. Tulika; lyrics: V. Lazarev), Son of Russia (music: St. Tulika; lyrics: V. Kharitonov), Vasya-Vasilyok duet with I.S. Bukreev (ca.1965), Song of the Volga Boatmen , Death of Varyag. He possibly sang Spring of 1945 (by Mrs.Pakhmutova) as a duet with I. Bukreev, but this was unrecorded. Kharitonov also sang Quand fera-t-il jour, camarade? as a duet with French singer Mireille Mathieu. It was recorded in France but not published, and Kharitonov made enquiries about it over the years, but the recording was not found.

== Discography ==
=== From 1972 ===
See discography navbox at bottom of page.

=== From 1965 ===
There is a full discography on Leonid Kharitonov's official website. All his 1965-1972 records are included in the Alexandrov Ensemble discography section of the Japanese Red Army website. This Japanese site also lists individual tracks by Kharitonov, linked to full album details.

== Concert repertoire ==
The following is a small selection:

=== Operatic arias ===
Ivan Susanin from Life for the Tsar by Glinka; King Rene from Iolanta by Tchaikovsky; Song of the Varangian Guest from Sadko by Rimsky-Korsakov; King Philip from Don Carlos by Verdi; Konchak from Prince Igor by Borodin; The Old-Man's Tale from Aleko by Rachmaninov; Kutuzov from War and Peace by Prokofiev; Serenade of Mefistofeles from Faust by Gounod, Song of the Flea by Mussorgsky.

== See also ==
- Alexandrov Ensemble soloists
- Alexandrov Ensemble choir
- Alexandrov Ensemble discography
