= My Army =

Soviet marching song

"My Army" (Russian: Армия моя) is a Soviet marching song written in the Russian language, performed by the Alexandrov Ensemble. The lyrics were written by Soviet musician and composer Rafael Moritsovich Plaksin (Russian: Рафаэль Морицович Плаксин). The music was composed by prolific Soviet composer Aleksandr Aleksandrovich Abramov (Russian: Александр Александрович Абрамов), in 1970.

A Persian language version of this song is also adopted by the National Liberation Army, the armed wing of the People's Mujahedin of Iran.

== Lyrics ==
Russian original

Если на Отчизну нагрянет беда,
Позовёт солдата труба.
Армия моя, ты на страже всегда!
Ты – моя любовь и судьба!

Припев:
Обыкновенная, судьба нелёгкая военная.
Любовь суровая, но верная.
Готовы мы на ратный труд.
Мы все испытаны ни раз, ни два боями-маршами.
Мы от солдата и до маршала – одна семья!

Наш Октябрь с нами в походном строю!
С нами песни красных бойцов,
Первый день войны, и победный салют,
И судьба погибших отцов…

Припев

Мчатся наши годы,
Но жизнь молода!
И поёт как прежде труба.
Армия моя, ты на страже всегда!
Ты – моя любовь и судьба!

Припев

Romanization of Russian

Yesli na Otchiznu nagryanet beda,
Pozovyot soldata truba,
Armiya moya, ty na strazhe vsegda!
Ty – moya lyubovy i sudyba!

Pripev:
Obyknovennaya, sud'ba nelyogkaya voyennaya.
Lyubov' surovaya, no vernaya.
Gotovy my na ratnyy trud.
My vse ispytany ni raz, ni dva boyami-marshami.
My ot soldata i do marshala – odna sem'ya!

Nash Oktyabr' s nami v pokhodnom stroyu!
S nami pesni krasnikh boytsov.
Pervyy den' voyny, i pobednyy salyut,
I sud'ba pogibshikh ottsov…

Pripev

Mchatsya nashi gody,
No zhizn' moloda!
I poyot kak prezhde truba.
Armiya moya, ty na strazhe vsegda!
Ty – moya lyubovy i sud'ba!

Pripev

English translation

If trouble suddenly breaks out in the Motherland,
A soldier will sound the trumpet
My army — forever you guard the frontier!
You, my heart, and fate above all!

Chorus:
A weight upon destiny for those in the military
Love is harsh but true as true can be
We're all ready for military service
We all! We all have seen our share of battle marches and declare!
We, from the soldier to the marshal, are all one family!

Our October is with us in marching formation!
With us are the songs of the Red soldiers,
the first day of the war and the victory fireworks,
And the history of our fallen fathers…

Chorus

Life remains young as we dash through the years
The trumpets never cease their call
My army – you're always on guard!
You, my heart, and fate above all!

Chorus:

== See also ==
- SovMusic entry for My Army, containing the song in Russian
- My Army (Армия моя) on You Tube
