= Suliko =

Georgian love poem

Suliko (Georgian: სულიკო, romanized: sulik'o, pronounced [sulikʼo]) is a Georgian unisex name meaning "soul". It is also the title of a love poem written in 1895 by Akaki Tsereteli, which became widely known throughout the Soviet Union as a song performed with music composed by Akaki's relative Varinka Tsereteli (in 1895), at the former's request. In that form it was often performed on radio during Joseph Stalin's rule, reputedly because it was his favorite. It was translated to and performed in multiple languages including Russian, Ukrainian, Polish, Romanian, English, German, Basque, Chinese, and Hebrew.

Due to Tsereteli’s close affiliation with the Georgian national liberation movement, Suliko is also imbued with his wish of an independent Georgian homeland, a manifest of the existential search of Akaki. As well as this, Suliko has also become a symbol, taking on a variety of interpretations by scholars throughout the decade. According to Akaki Bakradze, the sequential imageries of the rose, the nightingale, and the star trace a vertical ascent in search of God and "The Lost Paradise" that mankind was exiled from. Emzar Kvitaishvili expands on this idea, arguing that the search for Suliko as the embodiment of Supreme Love is associated with the search for God. Besides religious interpretations, Suliko is also a symbol for the ethereal, unattainable dream that occupies the vision of every listener, be it a pursuit for self-reconciliation, or the discovery for one's position in life.

Poet and folklorist Eter Tataraidze tells a story she heard in Tetritskaro Region village Toneti, according to which, Akaki has dedicated this poem to Suliko Samadashvili from Toneti; Akaki was friend with Samadashvili’s brother and was shocked by his tragic death; Suliko, who went to the town to buy clothes for the wedding was killed by wild animal in the forest and the bones were found only after several months of searching. According to the story, when Akaki came to the grave, he found Suliko’s beloved crying tears over the grave in despair. That is why, the initial line – „ჩემი ძმის საფლავს ვეძებდი, ვერ ვნახე, დაკარგულიყო“, {“I was searching for my brother’s grave, but could not find it, it has been lost”}, he changed to – „საყვარლის საფლავს ვეძებდი, ვერ ვნახე, დაკარგულიყო“, {“I was searching for my beloved’s grave, but could not find it, it has been lost”...} Obviously, a folk saying is far from true historic fact, though it reveals the far-reaching cultural influence this piece has in the folklore and beliefs of Georgians.

== Text ==
Georgian original	English version	Russian version
საყვარლის საფლავს ვეძებდი, ვერ ვნახე!.. დაკარგულიყო!.. გულამოსკვნილი ვტიროდი „სადა ხარ, ჩემო სულიკო?!“	I was looking for my sweetheart's grave, And longing was tearing my heart. Without love my heart felt heavy, I cried to the night – "Where are you, my Suliko? "	Я могилу милой искал, Но её найти нелегко, Долго я томился и страдал; Где же ты моя Сулико!
ეკალში ვარდი შევნიშნე, ობლად რომ ამოსულიყო, გულის ფანცქალით ვკითხავდი „შენ ხომ არა ხარ სულიკო?!“	Alone among the thorns of the bush A lone rose was blooming My heart was beating hard, I had to ask it: "Where have you hidden Suliko?"	Розу на пути встретил я, В поисках уйдя далеко, Роза, пожалей, услышь меня, Нет ли у тебя Сулико?
ნიშნად თანხმობის კოკობი შეირხა ... თავი დახარა, ცვარ-მარგალიტი ციური დაბლა ცრემლებად დაჰყარა.	For the confirmation nightingale, Ashamed and band softly down, Dew and pearl of heavenly tale, Shed as a tear on the ground.	Роза, наклонившись слегка, Свой бутон раскрыв широко, Тихо прошептала мне тогда Не найти тебе Сулико.
სულგანაბული ბულბული ფოთლებში მიმალულიყო, მივეხმატკბილე ჩიტუნას „შენ ხომ არა ხარ სულიკო?!“	A nightingale hid with bated breath In the branches of the rose thorn Gently, then, I asked him if he was the one, If he had any news of Suliko.	Среди роз душистых, в тени, Песню соловей звонко пел, Я у соловья тогда спросил Сулико не ты ли пригрел?
შეიფრთქიალა მგოსანმა, ყვავილს ნისკარტი შეახო, ჩაიკვნეს-ჩაიჭიკჭიკა, თითქოს სთქვა"დიახ, დიახო!“	The Nightingale lifted his head high And sang a loud clear song to the stars His eyes held a gleam, and he cocked his head As if to tell me "Yes, yes, I know Suliko!"	Соловей вдруг замолчал, Розу тронул клювом легко, Ты нашёл, что ищешь, — он сказал Вечным сном здесь спит Сулико ...
დაგვქათქათებდა ვარსკვლავი, სხივები გადმოსულიყო, მას შევეკითხე შეფრქვევით „შენ ხომ არა ხარ სულიყო?!“	Star was illuminating us, Beams had been came out from her, And I asked her heedlessly, fuss, Are you my Suliko mere	
დასტური მომცა ციმციმით, სხივები გადმომაყარა და იმ დროს ყურში ჩურჩულით ნიავმაც ასე მახარა	Confirmation gave with twinkling, Spread beams really sad, While in ear by whispering, Breeze identically make me glad	
„ეგ არის, რასაც ეძებდი, მორჩი და მოისვენეო! დღე დაიღამე აწ ტკბილად და ღამე გაითენეო!		
„სამად შექმნილა ის ერთი ვარსკვლავად, ბულბულ, ვარდადო, თქვენ ერთანეთი რადგანაც ამ ქვეყნად შეგიყვარდათო“.		
მენიშნა!.. აღარ დავეძებ საყვარლის კუბო-სამარეს, აღარც შევჩვი ქვეყანას, აღარ ვღვრი ცრემლებს მდუღარეს!		
ბულბულს ყურს ვუგდებ, ვარდს ვყნოსავ, ვარსკვლავს შევყურებ ლხენითა და, რასაცა ვგრძნობ მე იმ დროს, ვერ გამომითქვამს ენითა!	I listen to the nightingale's songs I smell the perfume of that wild rose I see the stars, and what I feel then No words could describe!	
ისევ გამეხსნა სიცოცხლე, დღემდე რომ მწარედ კრულ იყო, ახლა კი ვიცი, სადაც ხარ სამგან გაქვს ბინა, სულიკო!	Ah, life has meaning once more now! Night and day, I have hope And I have not lost you, my Suliko; I shall always return to you, I know now where you rest.	

== Online performances ==
There are many online renditions of Suliko. The following are some that demonstrate the varying performance traditions surrounding this piece:

1. Mdzlevari Ensemble
2. Alexandrov Ensemble
3. Large Academic Chorus of Mendeleev University
4. Franco Tenelli (with English subtitles)
5. N. Varshanidze, Ch. Surmanidze & Ensemble Batumi
6. Adi Yacobi
