= Vdol po Piterskoy =

"Вдоль по Питерской"

Song
- Language: Russian
- English title: "Vdol po Piterskoy"
- Genre: Folk
- Songwriter: Feodor Chaliapin

"Vdol po Piterskoy" (Russian: Вдоль по Питерской, lit. "Down the Piterskaya Road") is a song created by Russian singer Feodor Chaliapin based on Russian folk songs.

== Historical background ==
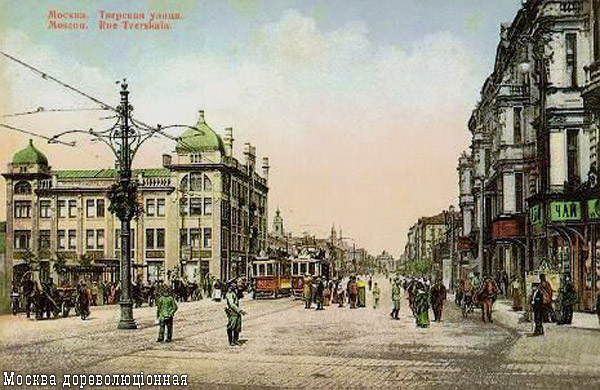
Moscow, Tverskaya-Yamskaya Street. 1917.

Shalyapin created the song by combining three folk songs. It consists of two melodically distinct parts. The first one combines yamshchik's song «Вдоль по Питерской»:

Как по Питерской, по дороженьке
По Тверской-Ямской, по Коломенской...

and the folk dance song «Во пиру была». The second, fast-paced part is based on the dance chastushkas of Volga Region «Кумушка».

Vladimir Gilyarovsky, a Russian journalist and writer, devoted a chapter of his book Moscow and Muscovites to the song.

Later that expression became a catchphrase meaning “to do something in plain sight” (to ride, to fly, etc.). Nikolai Dobronravov, a Russian poet, used the phrase in his song "You know what a guy he was" dedicated to Yuri Gagarin.

In fact, there was no such Piterskaya Street; It was a colloquial reference to the Tverskaya-Yamskaya street ("Tverskaya yam road"), now Tverskaya Street

== Settings and performance ==
Some works of such composers as Tchaikovsky or Stravinsky contain themes based on «Vdol po Piterskoy».

The song was further popularized by the Alexandrov Ensemble. It also appeared in the repertoires of Yuri Gulyayev, Leonid Kharitonov, Dmitri Hvorostovsky, Sergei Lemeshev, Vladimir Matorin, and Muslim Magomayev.
