= The Song of the Volga Boatmen =

Russian folk song

Song
- Language: Russian
- Published: 1866
- Genre: Russian folk

«Эй, ухнем!» audio
- 1902 recording by Feodor Chaliapin (in Russian): file; help

"The Song of the Volga Boatmen" audio
- 1926 recording published by Lansbury's Labour Weekly (in English): file; help

The "Song of the Volga Boatmen" (known in Russian as Эй, ухнем! [Ey, ukhnyem!, "Yo, heave-ho!"], after the refrain) is a well-known traditional Russian song collected by Mily Balakirev and published in his book of folk songs in 1866. It was sung by burlaks, or barge-haulers, on the Volga River. Balakirev published it with only one verse (the first). The other two verses were added at a later date. Ilya Repin's famous painting Barge Haulers on the Volga depicts such burlaks in Tsarist Russia toiling along the Volga.

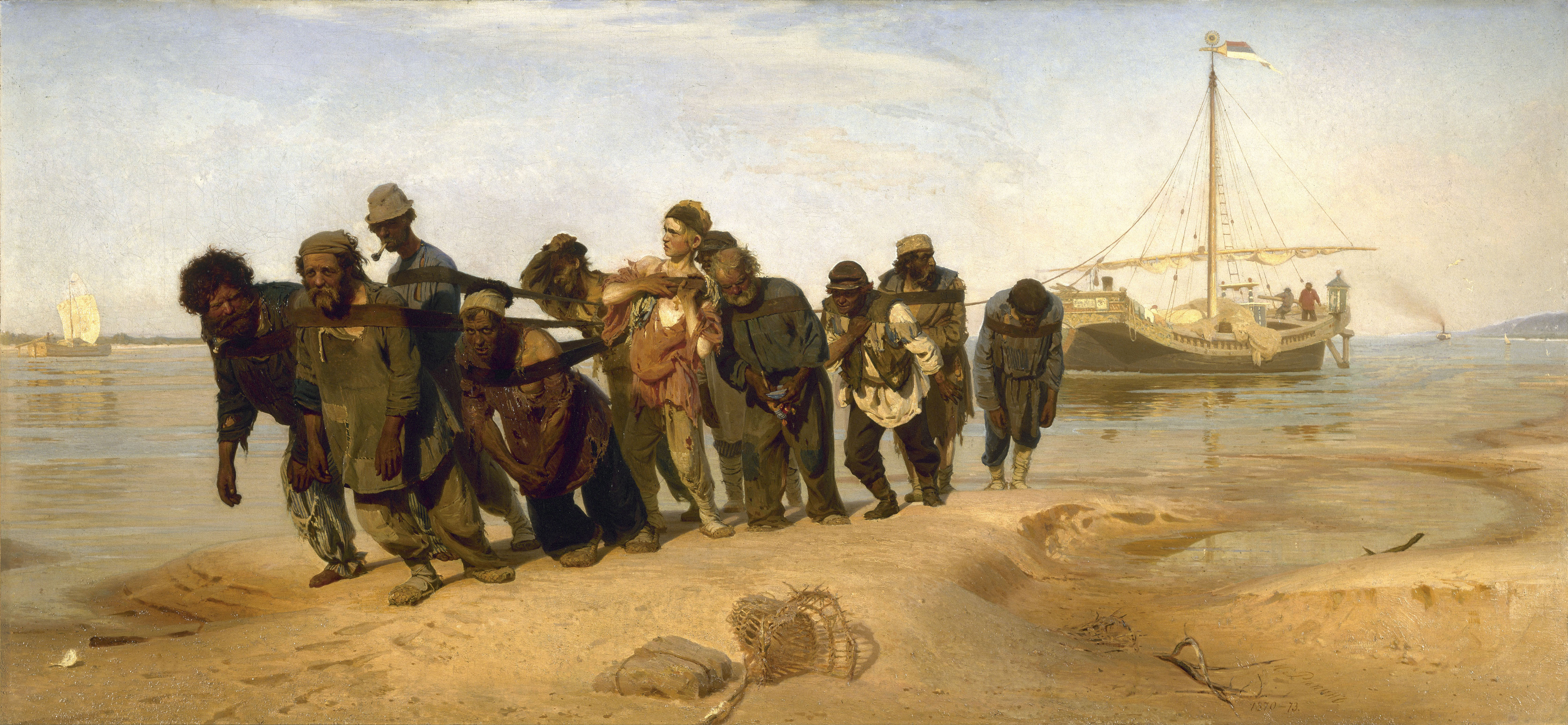
Ilya Yefimovich Repin's painting Barge Haulers on the Volga, 1873

The song was popularized by Feodor Chaliapin, and has been a favorite concert piece of bass singers ever since. Bill Finegan's jazz arrangement for the Glenn Miller band took the song to No. 1 in the US charts in 1941. Russian composer Alexander Glazunov based one of the themes of his symphonic poem "Stenka Razin" on the song. Spanish composer Manuel de Falla wrote an arrangement of the song, which was published under the name Canto de los remeros del Volga (del cancionero musical ruso) in 1922. He did so at the behest of diplomat Ricardo Baeza, who was working with the League of Nations to provide financial relief for the more than two million Russian refugees who had been displaced and imprisoned during World War I. All proceeds from the song's publication were donated to this effort. Igor Stravinsky made an arrangement for orchestra.

== First publications and recordings ==
A version of the song was recorded by Mily Balakirev (a Russian composer) from Nikolay Aleynikov in Nizhny Novgorod in 1860 or 1861. Already in 1866, the musician published it in his book A collection of Russian folk songs (Russian: «Сборникъ русскихъ народныхъ пѣсенъ»; 1866), with his own arrangement.

The first released version of the song was probably recorded in Russia in 1900 by Alexander Makarov-Yunev (Russian: Александр Макаров-Юнев) on Gramophone (#22086).

== Lyrics ==
Russian	Transliteration	(Poetic) English translation
Эй, ухнем! Эй, ухнем! Ещё разик, ещё да раз! Эй, ухнем! Эй, ухнем! Ещё разик, ещё да раз! Разовьём мы берёзу, Разовьём мы кудряву! Ай-да, да ай-да, Aй-да, да ай-да, Разовьём мы кудряву. Разовьём мы кудряву. Эй, ухнем! Эй, ухнем! Ещё разик, ещё да раз! Мы по бережку идём, Песню солнышку поём. Ай-да, да ай-да, Aй-да, да ай-да, Песню солнышку поём. Эй, эй, тяни канат сильней! Песню солнышку поём. Эй, ухнем! Эй, ухнем! Ещё разик, ещё да раз! Эх ты, Волга, мать-река, Широка и глубока, Ай-да, да ай-да, Aй-да, да ай-да, Волга, Волга, мать-река Эй, ухнем! Эй, ухнем! Ещё разик, ещё да раз! Эй, ухнем! Эй, ухнем!	Ey, ukhnyem! Ey, ukhnyem! Yeshcho razik, yeshcho da raz! Ey, ukhnyem! Ey, ukhnyem! Yeshcho razik, yeshcho da raz! Razovyom my byeryozu, Razovyom my kudryavu! Ai-da, da ai-da, Ai-da, da ai-da, Razovyom my kudryavu. Razovyom my kudryavu. Ey, ukhnyem! Ey, ukhnyem! Yeshcho razik, yeshcho da raz! My po byeryezhku idyom, Pyesnyu solnyshku poyom. Ai-da, da ai-da, Ai-da, da ai-da, Pyesnyu solnyshku poyom. Ey, Ey, tyani kanat silney! Pyesnyu solnyshku poyom. Ey, ukhnyem! Ey, ukhnyem! Yeshcho razik, yeshcho da raz! Ekh, ty, Volga, mat'-reka, Shiroka i gluboka, Ai-da, da ai-da, Ai-da, da ai-da, Volga, Volga, mat'-reka Ey, ukhnyem! Ey, ukhnyem! Yeshcho razik, yeshcho da raz! Ey, ukhnyem! Ey, ukhnyem!	Yo, heave ho! Yo, heave ho! Once more, once again, still once more! Yo, heave ho! Yo, heave ho! Once more, once again, still once more! Now we fell the stout birch tree, Now we pull hard: one, two, three. Ay-da, da, ay-da! Ay-da, da, ay-da! Now we pull hard: one, two, three. Now we pull hard: one, two, three. Yo, heave ho! Yo, heave ho! Once more, once again, still once more! As we walk along the shore, To the sun, we sing our song. Ay-da, da, ay-da! Ay-da, da, ay-da! To the sun, we sing our song. Hey, hey, let's heave a-long the way To the sun, we sing our song. Yo, heave ho! Yo, heave ho! Once more, once again, still once more! Oh, you, Volga, mother river, Mighty stream so deep and wide. Ay-da, da, ay-da! Ay-da, da, ay-da! Volga, Volga, mother river. Yo, heave ho! Yo, heave ho! Once more, once again, still once more! Yo, heave ho! Yo, heave ho!

The English lyrics above fit the melody. A more accurate translation of some lines are:

Poetic	Literal
Now we fell the stout birch tree,	We'll untwist the birch tree,
Now we pull hard: one, two, three.	We'll untwist the curly tree!
Hey, hey, let's heave a-long the way.	Hey, hey, pull the rope harder!
Mighty stream so deep and wide.	Wide and deep,

== Notable recordings and arrangements ==
"Song of the Volga Boatmen"
- 1941 recording by Glenn Miller, RCA Bluebird, B-11029-A

Single by Glenn Miller Orchestra
- Released: 1941
- Genre: Swing; big band; jazz
- Label: RCA Bluebird

Feodor Koenemann arranged the song for Chaliapin, whose rendition became one of Russia's most popular songs, with several releases, including in 1922, 1927, and 1936.

The final movement from Max Bruch's Suite on Russian Folk Melodies, Op. 79b, is this song.

In 1905, Alexander Glazunov created his piece Ey, ukhnyem based on the Balakirev's tune.

In April 1917, Igor Stravinsky was asked by Sergei Diaghilev to orchestrate it for wind instruments, as the opening piece of a concert that would normally have begun with the Russian national anthem "God Save the Tsar", except that Tsar Nicholas II had recently abdicated. Stravinsky worked all night to have the music ready, assisted by Lord Berners and Ernest Ansermet.

Tenor Vladimir Rosing recorded the song twice, once with orchestra for Vocalion, and again in an acapella version for Parlophone in 1933.

Czech composer Vítězslav Novák utilizes the main motif from Song of the Volga Boatmen in his Májová symfonie (May Symphony, Op. 73, 1943), for soloists, mixed chorus, and orchestra.

A translated vocal version was sung by Paul Robeson.

The first two lines of the song, in English, were used in George Formby's 1934 song, "Madame Moscovitch".

The Boston Pops Orchestra conducted by Arthur Fiedler recorded the Glazunov arrangement of the tune in New York City on June 30, 1937.

The song, or at least the tune, was popularized in the mid-20th century through an instrumental jazz version played by the Glenn Miller Orchestra. Glenn Miller released the song as an RCA Bluebird 78 single, B-11029-A, in 1941 in a swing jazz arrangement by Bill Finegan which reached no. 1 on the Billboard pop singles chart in a 10-week chart run. Not in copyright, the song was not subject to the 1941 ASCAP boycott, allowing for more radio play that year.

In 1965, Leonid Kharitonov, together with the Russian Red Army Choir, released a recording. Billy Squier included the Volga Boatmen melody as counterpoint in his 1981 song "The Stroke" and may have sampled it from the 1965 Red Army Chorus recording.

The memorable melody of "The Song of the Volga Boatmen" was used in various media, generally as background music; a notable example being found in the video game Perestroika and Punch-Out!! for NES, where it is the entry theme of the Russian boxer Soda Popinski. Some uses, particularly those portending doom or despair, employ only the iconic four-note beginning; others go so far as to add new, often wryly humorous, lyrics, such as the "Birthday Dirge".

In the second episode of the American animated television series Tom and Jerry, "The Midnight Snack" (1941), a variation of "The Song of the Volga Boatmen" is heard during Jerry's great effort in carrying a heavy cheese, possibly a reference to the difficult work of barge haulers.

From 1994 until 2011, the Fremantle Dockers, an Australian Football League team, used a portion from Stravinsky's arrangement in their team song "Freo Heave Ho".

== See also ==
- List of Billboard number-one singles of the 1940s
