= Boris Aleksandrov (composer) =

Soviet composer (1905–1994)

- Борис Александров
- Born: August 4, 1905; Bologoye, Novgorod Governorate, Russian Empire
- Died: June 17, 1994 (aged 88); Moscow, Russia
- Resting place: Novodevichy Cemetery
- Occupations: Composer, musician
- Known for: Leader of the Alexandrov Ensemble
- Father: Alexander Alexandrov

Boris Aleksandrovich Aleksandrov (Note: Russian: Борис Александрович Александров, romanized: Boris Aleksandrovich Aleksandrov) (Russian: Борис Александрович Александров; 4 August 1905 – 17 June 1994) was a Soviet and Russian composer and, from 1946 to 1986, the second head of the Alexandrov Ensemble which was founded by his father, Alexander Vasilyevich Alexandrov. Aleksandrov reached the rank of Major-General and was awarded the order of Hero of Socialist Labour, the Lenin and Stalin Prize, and named People's Artist of the USSR.

== Life ==
=== Early years ===
He began his musical career, aged 13, as a viola player and in the children's choir at the Bolshoi Theatre in Moscow, performing alongside singers such as Feodor Chaliapin. From 1923 to 1929 he attended the Moscow Conservatory, taught by Reinhold Glière. From 1929 to 1937 he ran the music department of the newly established Central Theatre of the Red Army and from 1933 to 1941 was associate professor of Moscow Conservatory. In 1937, he became the deputy artistic director of the Alexandrov Ensemble. He was also a composer, writing in various genres of symphonic and chamber instrumental music.

=== World War II ===
During World War II, Boris Aleksandrov, with his father, led the ensemble in All-Union radio concerts and over 1500 concerts at the Front, officially to actively promote Russian folk music and the songs of Soviet composers and folk music for the sake of patriotism and morale. During this time, Boris shouldered increasing responsibility, due to his father's heart condition. After Alexandrov's death in 1946, Boris Aleksandrov, his son, went on to succeed his father as musical director for the ensemble.

=== Leadership of the Ensemble ===
Boris Aleksandrov was a composer, arranger, conductor, music critic, artist and teacher: an important 20th century figure in Russian military music. He saw to the training and promotion of many fine soloists. After World War II, the ensemble, led by Boris Aleksandrov, traveled abroad sixty-eight times and was well received in many countries throughout Europe. He carried on the central idea which drove his father: that the choir was central to the ensemble, and that without the choir there would be no ensemble.

=== Close of a long career ===
In 1985, his 80th birthday was publicly celebrated. Aleksandrov finally retired in 1987. He was succeeded by Igor Agafonnikov the same year, with Anatoly Maltsev as the ensemble chief. He retired as the principal conductor in 1994; he died that year and was buried in Moscow at the Novodevichy Cemetery. He was succeeded by Viktor Fedorov, the chorus master since 1986.

== Collaborations ==
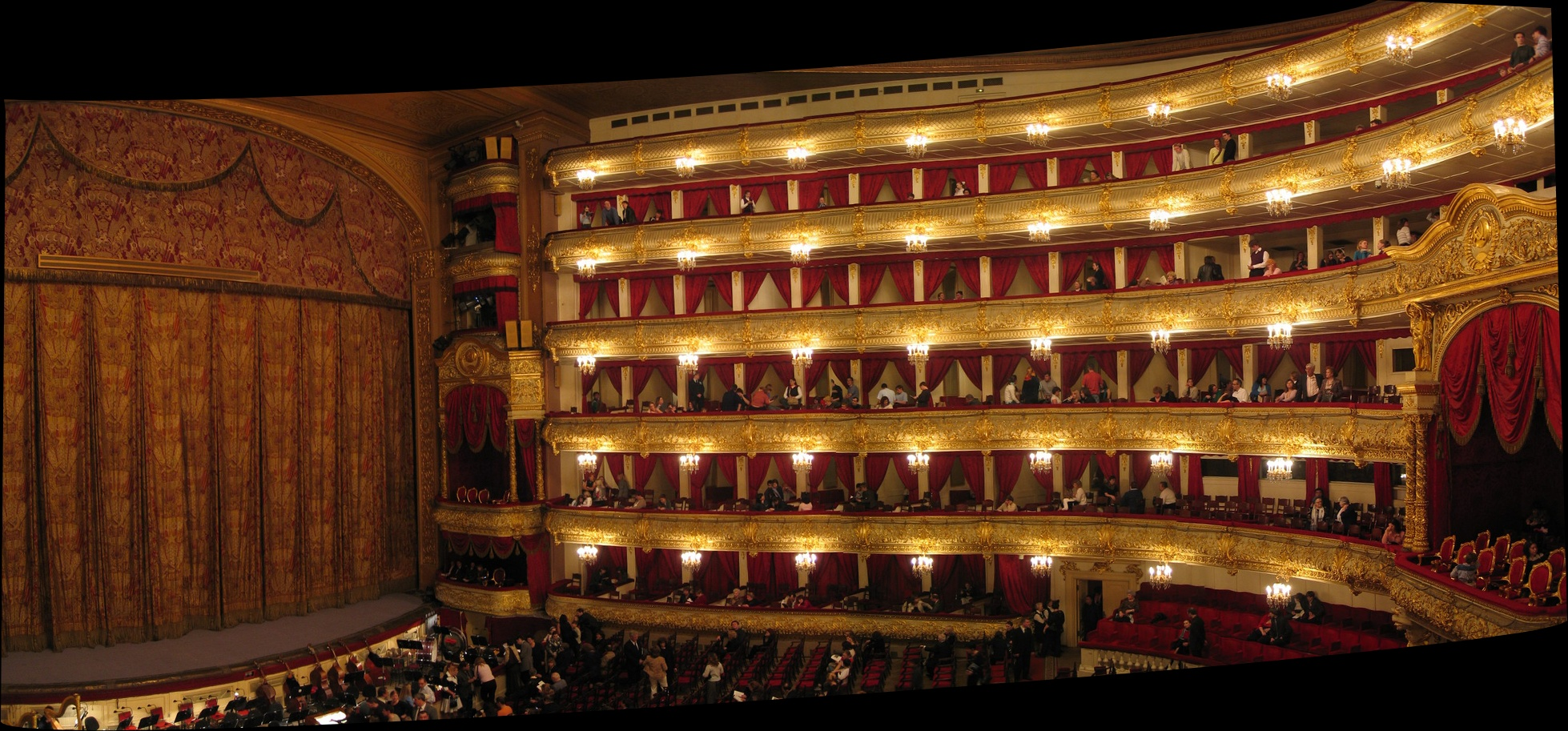
Moscow's Bolshoi Theatre, where Boris Aleksandrov began to learn his trade, performing alongside great performers such as Chaliapin.

The ensemble under Boris Aleksandrov worked with People's Artist of the RSFSR, laureate of Stalin Prize KP Vinogradov; People's Artist of the USSR Y. Petrov the Principal Chorus Master; VG Sokolov (later People's Artist of the USSR and Professor of the Moscow Conservatory); BI Kulikov (later Rector of the Moscow Conservatory); ES Tytyanko (People's Artist of the USSR); and VV Samsonenko, AP Kulygin and VI Chusei, all Honored Artists of the RSFSR. Dancers worked with People's Artist of the USSR PP Virsky, soloists of the Bolshoi Theatre, Honored Art Worker AI Radunsky and Honored Artist of the RSFSR KG Farmanyants and People's Artist of the USSR U.P. Khmelnitski. The orchestra worked with VA Aleksandrov, VV Samsonenko both Honored Artist of the RSFSR, and People's Artist of the RSFSR VA Korobko.

== Compositions and arrangements ==
He added over 150 new works to the repertoire, including works of composers local to the countries visited by the ensemble. He worked with living Soviet composers, enriching both works and performance. He wrote symphonic, chamber, instrumental, vocal-symphonic and theatrical music, and specialized in military music. He wrote a national anthem for which he received an award from the Ministry of Culture of the Soviet Union, and for which he was known by contemporaries as "the soldier-patriot". In 1937 he wrote the operetta Wedding in Malinovka which contained patriotic themes: revolutionaries, soldiers, peasants and folk music. Other operettas include The Girl from Barcelona (1942) about Russian partisans and a female Spanish co-combatant; My Gyuzel (1946), Near You (1949) and The One Hundred and First Wife (1957). Ballets include Young Friendship and Southpaw (1955). He also wrote cantatas including Cantata of the Party (1955), the oratorio October Soldier Defending the World (1967), Book of the Motherland (1979), plus the suite Guarding (1981).

Aleksandrov composed the song "Long Live Our State" (Да здравствует наша держава) to be the anthem of the Soviet Union. It was rejected however, but the 1943 composition (with different lyrics) became the national anthem of Transnistria in the 1990s. The song was used in parades in the Soviet Union and continues to be used at the end of Victory Day parades in Moscow today, adapted as a military march. Another march composed by him is "March of Joint Armies".

== Awards ==
- Medal "For Distinguished Labour" (1939)
- Honored Artist of the RSFSR (1944)
- People's Artist of the RSFSR (1948)
- Three Orders of Lenin (1949, 1967, 1975)
- Stalin Prize, 1st class (1950)
- Medal "For Battle Merit" (1953)
- People's Artist of the USSR (1958)
- Order of the Red Banner of Labour (1964)
- Hero of Socialist Labour (1975)
- Lenin Prize (1978)
- Order "For Service to the Homeland in the Armed Forces of the USSR", 3rd class (1982)
- Glinka State Prize of the RSFSR (1985)
- Order of the October Revolution (1985)
- Order of the Patriotic War, 2nd class (1985)

== See also ==
- Alexandrov Ensemble
- Alexandrov Ensemble choir
- Alexandrov Ensemble discography
- Alexander Vasilyevich Alexandrov
- List of Alexandrov Ensemble soloists
