= Polyushko-pole =

"Song of the Plains"

Song
- Language: Russian
- Written: 1933
- Composer: Lev Knipper
- Lyricist: Viktor Gusev

"Song of the Plains" (Russian: Полюшко-поле), also known as "Meadowlands", "Cavalry of the Steppes" or "O Fields, My Fields", is a Soviet song. In Russian, póle (поле) means 'plain', and pólyushko (полюшко) is a diminutive and hypocoristic form of póle.

== Soviet arrangements ==
The music was composed by Lev Knipper, with lyrics by Viktor Gusev in 1933. The song was part of the symphony with chorus (lyrics by Gusev) "A Poem about a Komsomol Soldier" (Поэма о бойце-комсомольце) composed in 1934. The original lyrics are sung from the perspective of a Red Army recruit, who proudly leaves his home to keep watch against his homeland's enemies.

The song was covered many times by many artists in the Soviet Union, including a well-known rock version recorded by Poyushchiye Gitary, released c. 1967. The song has been regularly performed and recorded by the Alexandrov Ensemble, best known as the Red Army Choir, and it is listed in the Alexandrov Ensemble discography.

=== Full version at London 1945 Youth Congress ===
At the opening of the London 1945 Youth Congress, the full version of Polyushko-polye was performed by a choir of 6,000 members.

== Other arrangements ==
Paul Robeson recorded the song in 1942 under the title "Song of the Plains", sung both in English and Russian. It was released on his Columbia Recordings album Songs of Free Men (1943).

The Swedish jazz pianist Jan Johansson recorded a version of the song in 1967 under the title "Stepp, min stepp" (steppe, my steppe) on the album Jazz på ryska (Jazz in Russian).

The American rock band Jefferson Airplane had an instrumental version of the song, titled "Meadowlands", on their album Volunteers (1969).

An arrangement by Phillip Bimstein titled "Meadowlands", recorded by his band Phil 'N' the Blanks and released on the 1982 album Lands and Peoples.

An instrumental version of the song was recorded by James Last and appears in his James Last - In Russia album.

Outside Russia, several arrangements of the tune are known under the title "The Cossack Patrol", particularly a version by Ivan Rebroff.

== Cultural influence ==
Michael Palin notably performed the song with the choir of the Russian Pacific Fleet in the television series Full Circle with Michael Palin.

The song is the third one heard at the beginning of Cast Away, an American movie starring Tom Hanks, right after Elvis Presley's "Heartbreak Hotel" and "All Shook Up".

The song is used throughout the movie "REDS" (1981), the epic historical drama about American journalist John Reed who chronicled the October Revolution in Russia in 1917.

The opening credits of the 1966 Cold War comedy film The Russians Are Coming the Russians Are Coming uses this song.

The anime Girls und Panzer uses "Polyushko-polye" along with "Katyusha" as the theme songs for the fictional "Pravda Girls High School".

High school teacher Pedersen's pupils sing the song in the class room, and the melody is used throughout the film Comrade Pedersen.

The melody is the basis for Ervin and Andrea Litkei’s song "Hold Me Forever", which is featured in the credits for season 4, episode 6 of What We Do in the Shadows.

Blackmore's Night adapted the melody for "Gone with the Wind", which appears on their 1999 album Under a Violet Moon.

It is used in the opening scene of the TV series Kleo, and a remix version by Modeselektor appears in the closing credits of the season 1 final episode.

Chabad-Lubavitch chasidim created a nigun using the tune and sing it to the words "Der Rebbe Zal Zayn Gezunt" (may the Rebbe be healthy).

German power metal band Powerwolf used the melody of "Polyushko-polye" for the song "Werewolves of Armenia" in their 2009 album Bible of the Beast.

In the American Television show, Airwolf, season 1 episode 5, the song is featured in song and on the cello.

It is a theme song in the 2021 Russian film Captain Volkonogov Escaped.

The Rahbani brothers reused the melody, crediting Knipper, in their 1974 play "Loulou", for the song "Kanou Ya Habibi", which was sung by Fairuz.
