= The Sacred War =

Soviet patriotic song

Song
- Written: 1941
- Genre: Martial music
- Composer: Alexander Vasilyevich Alexandrov
- Lyricist: Vasily Lebedev-Kumach

1941 recording

"The Sacred War" (Note: Russian: Священная война, romanized: Svyashchennaya voyna, IPA: [svʲɪˈɕːenːəjə vɐjˈna]) is one of the most famous Soviet songs of World War II. The music is by Alexander Alexandrov, founder of the Alexandrov Ensemble and the musical composer of the State Anthem of the Soviet Union. The lyrics are by Vasily Lebedev-Kumach.

The circumstances of the composition and first performance of the song were hurried; the lyrics were published on 24 June 1941, and Alexandrov immediately wrote the music for them, writing the notes out on a blackboard for the singers to copy manually. The first performance was on 26 June at Belorussky Railway Station, where according to eyewitnesses it was sung five times in succession.

In the 1990s, Russian media published the allegation that the lyrics had been plagiarized by Lebedev-Kumach, and that they were indeed written during the First World War by Aleksandr Bode (1865–1939). These claims were taken to court, and the newspaper Nezavisimaya Gazeta in June 2000 was forced to publish a retraction of the claim. Prof. Evgeniy Levashev (2000) still upheld doubts on the authorship, and on the reasonableness of the court's decision.

== Lyrics ==
Russian original

Вставай страна огромная,
Вставай на смертный бой
С фашистской силой тёмною,
С проклятою ордой.

Припев:
Пусть ярость благородная
Вскипает как волна!
Идёт война народная,
Священная война!

Дадим отпор душителям
Всех пламенных идей,
Насильникам грабителям,
Мучителям людей!

Припев

Не смеют крылья чёрные
Над Родиной летать,
Поля её просторные
Не смеет враг топтать!

Припев

Гнилой фашистской нечисти
Загоним пулю в лоб,
Отребью человечества
Cколотим крепкий гроб!

Припев

Romanization of Russian (Croatian-styled)

Vstaváj straná ogrómnaja,
Vstaváj na smértnyj boj
S fašístskoj síloj tjómnoju,
S prokljátoju ordój.

Pripév:
Pustj járostj blagoródnaja
Vskipájet, kak volná!
Idjót vojná naródnaja,
Svjaščénnaja vojná!

Dadím otpór dušíteljam
Vseh plámennyh idej,
Nasíljnikam, grabíteljam,
Mučíteljam ljudéj!

Pripév

Ne sméjut krýljja čjórnyje
Nad Ródinoj letátj,
Poljá jejó prostórnyje
Ne sméjet vrag toptátj!

Pripév

Gnilój fašístskoj néčisti
Zagónim púlju v lob,
Otrébjju čelovéčestva
Skolótim krépkij grob!

Pripév

English translation

Arise, vast country,
Arise for a fight to the death
Against the dark fascist force,
Against the cursed horde.

Chorus:
Let noble wrath
Boil over like a wave!
This is the people's war,
A Sacred War!

We shall repulse the oppressors
Of all ardent ideas,
The rapists and the plunderers,
The torturers of people!

Chorus

The black wings shall not dare
Fly over the Motherland,
On her spacious fields;
The enemy shall not dare tread!

Chorus

We'll drive a bullet into the forehead
Of the rotten fascist filth.
For the scum of humanity,
We shall build a solid coffin!

Chorus

== Charts ==
=== Alexandrov Ensemble version ===
2025 weekly chart performance for "Svyashchennaya Voyna"
Chart (2025)	Peak position
Russia Streaming (TopHit)	82

2026 weekly chart performance for "Svyashchennaya Voyna"
Chart (2026)	Peak position
Russia Streaming (TopHit)	74

== See also ==
- Great Patriotic War (term)
- "Arise, Russian people!"
