= List of Alexandrov Ensemble soloists =

Russian choral soloists

This is an alphabetical list of the basso profondo, bass, bass-baritone and tenor soloists who have performed with the Alexandrov Ensemble (under its various titles) since its establishment in 1928. It is difficult to differentiate between regular and guest soloists, since many have alternated between the one category and the other during their careers, so they are all listed together. Soloists of whom no recordings have yet been found have been listed below as "other soloists".

== Introduction ==
In 2004, Max Loppert said of Georgy Vinogradov: "How is it possible for any singer of this caliber to have been (outside Russia) this unknown?". One could say the same of the whole group. Before April 2009, almost all online resources on this subject were in Russian and Japanese, and even these were limited in content, so far as the biographies of most soloists were concerned. As of 2009, there was almost no online information about the tenor Victor Nikitin, who made a 78 rpm recording of Cold Waves Lapping in the 1940s, and his last traceable recording appears to have been made in 1951, the same year as the rumours of a bar-room brawl and the end of Georgy Vinogradov's career.

=== Status of soloists ===
Apart from guest soloists, there are two ways of contracting a soloist in the Alexandrov Ensemble:

- A soloist of the choir is a constant member of the choir and only sometimes has one or two solo performances with certain songs specially selected for their personal vocal capabilities.
- Soloist of the ensemble is a higher grade, meaning that the singer is a soloist on a constant basis and never – or no longer – takes part in the choir.

== A to Z list of soloists ==
=== Georgi Andreyevich Abramov ===
Born in Moscow 12 April 1903; died in Georgia 1 November 1966 (Russian: Георгий Андреевич Абрамов). Bass soloist. Honoured Artist of Russia (1944). From 1918 to 1928 he worked as a mechanic or plumber in Moscow State University. In 1930 he entered an operatic singing competition on All-Union Radio. As a result of this, from 1931 to 1966 he was soloist of the All-Union Radio and television, taking part in opera productions. He was a concert singer, promoting the works of Soviet composers, and became the definitive singer of songs such as Roads (by Novikov), Treasured Stone, Single Accordion (by Mokrousov), and especially Bryansk Forest (by Katz). From 1954 to 1958 he was a music teacher at Gnessin State Musical College. He toured in Poland, Hungary, Romania and East Germany.

With Georgy Vinogradov and Vladimir Zakharov he recorded For those who are in Transit (S. Katz – A. Fatyanov), and the folksong Already as the Sea. With the Alexandrov Ensemble he recorded A Bryansk Forest (recorded 1948) for the All-Union Radio Committee.

=== Nikolai Afanasyevich Abramov ===
(Russian: Николай Афанасьевич. Абрамов), tenor soloist (1914–2001). He was in the ensemble as early as 1941. He became a founding member of the ensembles octet, founded in 1947, and was active as a soloist, winning first prize in the 1958 All-Union Competition for Soviet Song Singers. In 1958 he was awarded the title of Meritorious Artist of the Republic of the Russian Federation. He left the ensemble in September 1967 due to retirement. With the Alexandrov Ensemble he recorded: Smuglyanka duet with Ivan Savchuk (music: Novikov; lyrics: Ya Shvedov), unknown duet with A. Kusleev, Praying, unknown duet with L. M. Kharitonov, Here's the Deal (1963), Black Crow duet with A. Eisen (1956), Nut Brown Maiden duet with I. Savchuk (1953, 1956), The Little Bells (1956) Unfortunately, Nikolai Abramov's name was frequently incorrectly attributed on recordings, notably on the Kultur video of 1965 that is available in the West.

=== Vadim Petrovich Ananyev (Вадим Петрович Ананьев) ===
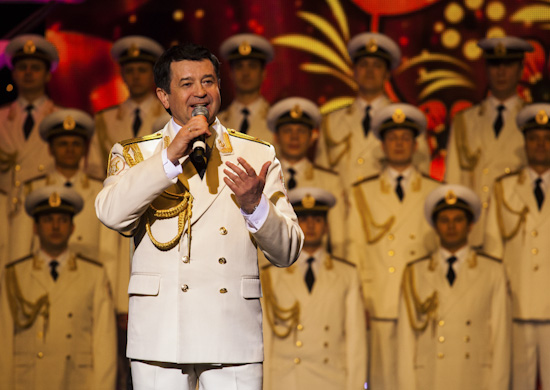
Vadim Ananyev

Born on 21 March 1959, Ananyev was a soloist of the ensemble in 2024. He was one of few soloists of the ensemble who did not board the plane to Syria, later lost in the 2016 Russian Defence Ministry Tupolev Tu-154 crash. He stayed to care for his recently born child.

=== Georgy Yakovlevich Andryushchenko ===
Georgy Yakovlevich Andryushchenko (Aravan, Kyrgyzstan, 1933 – 12 January 2011). (Russian: Георгий Яковлевич Андрющенко); also spelled "Andryushenko"; tenor soloist of the Bolshoi Theatre, People's Artist of Russia (1973). He studied at Gnessin State Musical College, and joined the Alexandrov Ensemble as a soloist in 1958. He performed at the Bolshoi Theatre 1963–1979, had a wide repertoire and was one of the leading tenors in a troupe which toured the world. From 1974 to 1976 he was the supervisor of the trainee group of Bolshoi Theatre soloists. From 1979 he was director of the Moscow Ice Ballet Ensemble. In the late 1980s he worked as general director of GosTsirk; he was the head of all circuses in Russia, and he published an article in Dei/Disillusionist magazine about a circus tour to the Vatican in 1982.

Within the Bolshoi Theatre his recorded operatic arias include the following: as Prince Andrei Khovansky in Modest Mussorgsky's opera Khovanshchina (1979); as Mikhailo Tucha in Pskovityanka (or A Girl from Pskov); as Alexey in Optimistic Tragedy by Kholminov; as Masalsky in October by Muradeli; as Marquise in The Gambler by Sergei Prokofiev from the story by Dostoyevsky; as Semyon in Semyon Kotko by Sergei Prokofiev.

=== Valentin Ivanovich Anisimov ===
Valentin Ivanovich Anisimov (1937 – 26 August 2002). (Russian: В. И. Анисимов), bass soloist (of the Odessa Opera House). People's Artist of Ukraine and Honoured Artist of Russia (1973). In 1962 he graduated from the Urals State Conservatory. From 1962 he was a soloist at Sverdlovsk, Ukraine and from 1967 at the Odessa Opera and Ballet Theatre. He gave 40 performances at the Bolshoi Theatre and gained a fine reputation throughout the USSR for singing in Verdi's opera Rigoletto. From 1980 he was soloist of the Moscow Philharmonic. He also taught at the Institute of Contemporary Art in the USSR.

With the Alexandrov Ensemble he recorded Veterans (music: Boris Alexandrov; lyrics S. Bencken).

=== Georgiy Ivanovich Babaev ===
(Russian: Г.И. Бабаев; also translated George Babayev),

Baritone soloist, Stalin Prize Laureate.

With the Alexandrov Ensemble he recorded Song of the Young Soldiers duet with V. Puchkov (music: P. Akulenko; lyrics: Ya Shvedov), Song about Klim Voroshilov duet with Yuseph Laute (music: Alexander Alexandrov; lyrics: O. Kolychev), Aside Native (music: A. Alexandrov; lyrics: S. Mikhalkov), Seasoned Cook (music: Z. Компанеец; lyrics: I. Lakshin), Song about Blyukher duet with V. Pankov (music: Alexander Alexandrov; lyrics: S. Alymov), I Myself (Slovak song).

=== Kim Ivanovich Bazarsadaev ===
(Russian: Ким Иванович Базарсадаев) (1937–2002) Bass soloist. Took part in the 1965 concert in the Tchaikovsky hall. Graduated from the Leningrad Conservatory (1963), worked as a soloist of the All-Russian touring association, the Red Banner Song and Dance Ensemble of the Soviet Army named after A.V. Aleksandrov. Alexander Alexandrov. Since 1966 – soloist of the Buryat State Academic Opera and Ballet Theater.

In the repertoire more than 30 roles, including Mephistopheles (“Faust” by Sh. Gounod), Attila in the opera of the same name by J. Verdi, Boris and Dositheus (“Boris Godunov” and “Khovanshchina” by M. Musorgsky), Melnik (“Rusalka” by A. Dargomyzhsky), Vladimir Galitsky (“Prince Igor” by A. Borodin) and others. Outstanding performer of bass parts in national operas (“Enlightenment” by B. Yampilov, “Enkhe-Bulat-Bator” by M. Frolov, etc.). In the concert repertoire – more than 300 works of Russian and European classics, romances, songs of different nations. He toured abroad (Mongolia, Czechoslovakia, England, Norway, Sweden, Finland, Japan, France, etc.). Prez. International Association of opera and ballet theaters of the Asian-Siberian region (1989). Chairman of the Board of the Buryat Respubl. Musical Society (1996).

People's Artist of the USSR (1981). Winner of the All-Union Glinka Vocalist Competition (1962). The TV film “Light over Baikal” (1986) is dedicated to B.'s creativity. The K.I. Bazarsadaev Cultural Foundation was established in the Republic of Buryatia (2006).

=== Evgeny Mikhailovich Belyaev ===
Soloist of the Ensemble. (Russian: Евгений Михайлович Беляев). Outside the USSR, one of the most celebrated tenor soloists under Boris Alexandrov was Evgeny Belyaev or Evgeny Mikhailovich Belyaev (1926–1994) . He was born 11 September 1926 in the Bryansk Oblast, and served in the subdivision of zenith troops during World War II. He then graduated from Gnessin State Musical College. In 1947 he was a soloist of the Ensemble of Song and Dance of the Carpathian military district, and in 1952 a Member of CPSU (Communist Party of the Soviet Union). In 1955 he was a soloist of the Ensemble of Song and Dance of the Soviet Army of Alexandrov. In 1967 he was made People's Artist of the USSR, and in 1978 he won the State Prize of the USSR. He died in 1994 (21 or 22 February).

Two of his most famous performances are Oh the Rye and Nightingale. The lyric of Nightingale asks the nightingale to be quiet as the soldiers are sleeping; i.e. they have died. One of his most popular recordings with The Alexandrov Ensemble is Kalinka.

=== Pyotr Dmitrievich Bogachev ===
(Russian: Петр Дмитриевич Богачёв), bass-baritone soloist. Honoured Artist of Russia. With the Alexandrov Ensemble he recorded In the Ocean Gave duet with S. Ivanov (music: B. Korostylev; lyrics: B. Bezhaev), It's a Long Time Since We Were Home duet with S. Ivanov (music: V.Solovev-Sedoy; lyrics: A. Fatyanov), We, the Army People duet with S. Ivanov (music: G. Movsesyan; lyrics: Robert Rozhdestvensky), Listen, Beauty duet with S. Ivanov (music: E. Martin; lyrics: M. Plyatskovsky), Your Soldiers duet with S. Ivanov (music: B. Gamal; lyrics: A. Sofronov), We go, We Go Into the Army duet with Ivan Bukreev (music: B. Aleksandrov; lyrics: V. Tatarinov), Smuglianka, duet with S. Ivanov (music: A. Novikov; lyrics: Y. Chvedov),The Samovars duet with S. Ivanov (music A. Novikov; lyrics: S. Alimov) (1982/92) , Nut Brown Girl duet with S. Ivanov (1989/92, 2003), Endless Sea duet with S. Ivanov, We Protect the Country duet with S. Ivanov, Afield duet with S. Ivanov (1992), Evening on the Roads duet with S. Ivanov (1992), Distant Northern Town trio with V.S. Buzurov and S. Ivanov (1992), Dixie duet with S. Ivanov 1992, Greetings from the Troops duet with S. Ivanov, Our Army duet with S. Ivanov (1984).

=== Ivan Semionovich Bukreev ===
Soloist of the Ensemble. (1924 – 1998). (Russian: Иван Семенович Букреев), lyric tenor soloist, People's Artist of the USSR, People's Artist of Russia. In World War II he was in the Air Force, and was seriously wounded in battle. In 1944 he graduated from the Gnessin State Musical College, and became a soloist in the Air Force ensemble. It has been suggested in the West that he was overshadowed by E. Belyaev, but Leonid Kharitonov remembers the following:

Bukreev didn’t have any specific reaction to Belyaev's success. Actually, he was glad for his colleague. Besides, it would be quite strange to compare them since they were different kinds of tenor – Belyaev was lyric tenor (higher voice) and Bukreev was a lyric and dramatic tenor (deeper voice). Bukreev never performed as a soloist abroad. Belyaev sang only three songs abroad and was mainly famous for the "Kalinka" song. In Russia they had equal popularity. Bukreev was teetotal and was a good husband and father to his wife and daughter.

Kharitonov only ever sang duets with one person, and that was Bukreev. With the Alexandrov Ensemble from 1953 to 1987/88 Bukreev gained a high reputation and recorded: Take Care, Soldier (music: Y. Milutin; lyrics: M. Lisyansky), Submariners' Waltz (music: V. Alexandrov; lyrics: Igor Morozov) (1965), Rides the Border (music: B. Muradeli; lyrics: A. Annual), We Go, We Go Into the Army duet with P. Bogachev (music: B. Aleksandrov; lyrics: V. Tatarinov), The Soldier (music: B. Mokrousov; lyrics: C. Islands), Our Soldiers (music: L. Lyadov; lyrics: A. Zharov), Nice Guy (music: A. Doluhanyan; lyrics: Nekrasova L.), Song of Prague (music: M. Blanter; lyrics: Anon) (1960), At Least (music: A. Doluhanyan; lyrics: M. Lisyansky), A Wave (music: A Doluhanyan; lyrics: M. Lisyansky), Soldier's Ways duet with Edward Labkovsky (music: B. Aleksandrov; lyrics: B. Dubrovin), Russian Accordion (music: B. Muradeli; lyrics: E. Savinov), I Took You into the Tundra (music: M. Fradkin; lyrics: M. Plyatskovsky) (performed 1982), Bird Cherry (music: M. Blanter; lyrics: M. Isakovsky), South-West Region (music: Yu Milyutin; lyrics: E. Dolmatovskaya), I Will Never Forget You (music: E. Kolmanovsky; lyrics: K. Vanshenkin) (ca.1965), Moscow Nights (music: V. Soloviev-Sedoi; lyrics: M. Matousovski) (1958), Bella Ciao duet with P. Slastnoi (Italian partisan song; arr. B. Pogrebov) (ca.1966), Bucharest Love, Homeland Night, Wait a Day to Return (1956), Song of the Border Defence Troops, two unknown solos, Spring of 1945 duet with Boris Shemyakov, Sky Blue Eyes (1978), Near the Garden trio with I.I. Savchuk and E. Belyaev, American Soldiers, That Soldier Heads Up, Far Away (1978), Don't Cry, Girl, Early Apple Blossom, Regiment Polka duet with V.P. Gorlanov, Ready Rocket Forces duet with V.L. Ruslanov, City of Rostov, In Our Company, Vasya-Vasilyok duet with L. M. Kharitonov (ca.1965), I'll Always be a Soldier.

=== Vladimir Abramovich Bunchikov ===
Baritone soloist. (Yekaterinoslav 21 November 1902 – 17 March 1995). Honoured Artist of Russia (1944).

From 1934, he recorded songs. With V. Kandelaki he sang jazz, and he sang with the popular orchestra directed by B. Knushevitsky, and with Boris Alexandrov's Song and Dance Ensemble of All-Union Radio and band. His main repertoire was the songs of Soviet composers. From 1942 to 1967 he was a soloist of the All-Union Radio. For 25 years he performed fine duets with the lyric tenor Vladimir Nechaev (1908–1969) whom he had met during World War II.

With the Ensemble of the All-Union Radio Committee under Boris Alexandrov he recorded Evening in the Roadstead/Night on the Road duet with P. Mikhailov (recorded 1942). This is a baritone-tenor duet, and the choir includes women sopranos. He also recorded Nightingale in the 1940s as a baritone-tenor duet with Georgi Pavlovich Vinogradov, It's a Long Time Since We Were Home duet with V. Nechaev.

=== E. Burchakov ===
(Russian: Е. Бурчаков), bass-baritone soloist. With the Alexandrov Ensemble he recorded Not a – Do Not Know (music: S. Tulika; lyrics: V. Malkov).

=== Victor Sergeievich Buzlov ===
(Russian: Виктор Сергеевич Бузлов). tenor soloist. Joined the Ensemble ca.1970. Since 1990 he has recorded with the Don Cossack Choir and V. Gavva, singing religious songs. With the Alexandrov Ensemble he has recorded The Birch Tree (1987), Distant Northern Town trio with S. Ivanov and P. Bogachev (1992), Moscow.

=== Vladimir Ivanovich Chernykh ===
(Russian: Владимир Иванович Черных), tenor / lyric baritone soloist. With the Alexandrov Ensemble he recorded Jet Pilot, Ballad of the Red Army, Loyalty duet with V. Azovtsev, Hail to the Infantry! with V. Shkaptsov (1978) and unknown song.

Critical commentary on a music video featuring Chernykh and Bukreev: They sing The Grey Cuckoo on Soviet Army Chorus and Dance Ensemble This screenshot illustrates the lack of public ego among the tenors of the Ensemble. In the West, a duet or trio of lyric tenors is often something of a competition for audience attention on the part of the singers – but here it is always a matter of humility to the music: blending; complementing; adjusting of the voice for perfect harmony of dynamic and musicality. The duettists always behave like the army choristers, whom Boris Alexandrov famously described as being so well-disciplined due to regular square-bashing. This was a joke as they are clearly as exhaustively rehearsed as any Georg Solti choir. This screenshot shows them not showing off, but simply working. It helps to illustrate that this army choir was really born of the Kazan Cathedral choir where Alexander Alexandrov learned his trade. The choir was never a sport of the operatic stage where Boris was trained.

=== Ivan Alexandrovich Didenko ===
Ivan Alexandrovich Didenko, soloist of the choir. (Russian: Иван Александрович Диденко); tenor soloist, (1924–2008).

Honored Artist of the RSFSR (1960). In 1945–47, he was a member of the Arkhangelsk Military District Orchestra. At the end of 1955, at the invitation of B.A. Alexandrov, he was transferred from the song and dance ensemble of the Belarusian Military District Headquarters to the twice Red Banner Ensemble named after A.V. Alexandrov as a soloist. He performed with great success works requiring a rich sound, such as Kakhovsky's aria with choir from Y. Shaporin's opera The Decembrists, A.V. Alexandrov's Song of the 27th Red Banner Division, A. Dolukhanyan's Song of the Hero City (“The Black Sea Sun is Burning”) by A. Dolukhanyan, the Civil War song “Chapaev, the Hero, Walked Through the Urals,” as well as ‘Blizzard’ by A. Varlamov and the Russian folk song “A Birch Tree Stood in the Field,” and the Ukrainian song “The Grey Cuckoo Sang.” With the participation of I. Didenko, recordings were made of works by B. Aleksandrov, “As the Party Says” in a duet with K. Gerasimov (1958) and “Festive Cantata” with E. Belyaev, A. Sergeev, and A. Kusleev (1958). From 1965 until his retirement in 1982, he sang in the choir.

With the Alexandrov Ensemble he recorded Lights Black Sun (music: A. Doluhanyan; lyrics: M. Lisyansky), The Birch Tree (1956) Snowflakes (1956) The Hero Chapayev Roamed The Urals, Song of the 27th Division and I have travelled around the entire universe

=== Viktor Konstantinovich Dmitriev ===
Viktor Konstantinovich Dmitriev (Russian: Виктор Константинович Дмитриев), bass soloist.

Bass singer. Born in 1927. He started out singing with the North Sea Fleet Song and Dance Ensemble, but moved to the Alexandrov Ensemble in October 1958. He was promoted to soloist in 1962 and continued to work until he retired in 1966. Many of his remaining recordings are by Muradeli. In the materials for his 1968 Japan tour (advertisements published in Record Geijutsu and elsewhere), his name is mistakenly listed as " Vladimir Dmitriev " (though he is listed correctly on the 1963 recording of Le Chant du Monde in France).

With the Alexandrov Ensemble he recorded the beautiful and dramatic Halt, Who Goes There! with Alexander Sibirtsev and B. Kazakov (music: B. Muradeli; lyrics: E. Dolmatovskaya). The Alarm Bells of Buchenwald in 1963 along with the live concert in 1964. Border Guard Song, Days of War and I am going

=== Arthur Arturovich Eisen ===
Arthur Arturovich Eisen (Russian: Артур Артурович Эйзен). bass-baritone soloist. (Moscow, 8 June 1927 – Moscow, 26 February 2008). Soloist of the Bolshoi Theatre,

Honoured Artist of Russia (1956), Order of the Red Banner of Labour (1971), People's Artist of the USSR (1976), Order of Friendship of Peoples (1988).

With the Alexandrov Ensemble he recorded: Elegy, Oh No John (1956), Cold Waves Lapping (1956), Black Raven, duet with N.A. Abramov (1956), 4 unknown solos (1956), Song of the Volga Boatmen.

=== Vasily Semyonovich Eliseev ===
Soloist of the choir. Born 1931; died 1982. (Russian:Василий Семёнович Елисеев), tenor with countertenor capability, i.e. with smooth transition to upper range, and good tone and projection throughout. There is a long tradition of countertenors in the Eastern Orthodox Church; this tradition continued during the Soviet era. With the Alexandrov Ensemble he recorded: Listen. On the Kultur video from which the screenshot is taken, Eliseev is incorrectly named as Nicolai A. Abramov.

Critical commentary on a music video featuring Vasily Eliseev: Eliseev sings Listen on the music video Soviet Army Chorus and Dance Ensemble The song, Listen, takes full advantage of Eliseev's countertenor capability. According to Eliseev's apparent age in the screenshot, he was probably born in the 1920s and spent his early career in World War II: a time of great hardship for the general populace. Music was a great solace for the troops and the people, and the Alexandrovs felt the need to produce a full range of compositions. They needed sopranos for their choir and soloists, but were not permitted them. Eliseev filled a need for a beautiful and highly trained voice, to allow not just extended chords for drama and pathos in the video, but chords to provide a beauty and spiritual dimension in the arrangement of Listen, in which a political prisoner voices his dreams of Outside. Just as the spiritual dimension of the song appears to reach through the music to beyond the studio, so this singer appears to be conscious of a level beyond himself, as seen in the screenshot, and as heard in his ethereal upper register.

=== Vladimir Vasilievich Fyodorov ===
(Russian: Владимир Васильевич Федоров) The only basso profondo that the Ensemble ever had.

He joined the Red Banner Red Army Song and Dance Ensemble in 1938. He was an active participant in front-line brigades during the Great Patriotic War. For many years, he was a regular performer of the Ukrainian folk song "Bandura" in a duet with G. Vinogradov, V. Nikitin, I. Kuznetsov and I. Savchuk. In an ensemble with V. Bycheev and M. Ivanov, he performed the songs "Falcons Walk" by B. Mokrousov, "Glory to the Fleet" by B. Terentyev and "Song of the Heart" by A. Khachaturian.

He was awarded the Order of the Badge of Honor (1949). He finished working in the ensemble on December 31, 1970.

With the Alexandrov Ensemble he recorded: Bandura duet with Evgeny Belyaev (1956), Viktor Nikitin (1948) Ivan Kuznetsov (1940s) and Ivan Savchuk (1950s) .

=== Stanislav Ivanovich Frolov ===
Stanislav Ivanovich Frolov (Russian: Станислав Иванович Фролов), magnificent Russian basso profondo (from GABTa). Ten years after graduation he worked as a film camera operator. He was then admitted to the State Music School in the Komi-Zyryan Autonomous Oblast. From 1960 to 1962 he was employed by the Kyrgyz Academy Theatre, then from 1964 to 1967 by the Belarusian Opera and Ballet. He joined the Bolshoi Theatre in Moscow as soloist, and in 1970 joined their tour to Japan. He joined the Alexandrov Ensemble in 1976, and was part of its tour to Japan in the same year. With the Alexandrov Ensemble he recorded Great October Holiday (music: Boris Alexandrov; lyrics: S. Bencken), Song of the Dnieper (music: M. Fradkin; music: E. Dolmatovskaya), The Red Cavalry (Civil War song: D. Pokrass), Song of the Fatherland, Song of the Golden Calf from the opera Faust (1995), Soldiers' Song (1983).

=== Valery Gavva ===
(Russian: Валерий Гавва), fine Russian bass. (b. Donetsk, Ukraine, 1947). He is descended from an old Cossack family. He attended the Industrial University of Rostov, and did military service in the Urals. After that, he studied music at the University of Donetsk in Ukraine. After graduating, he became an operatic soloist. In 1987 he joined the Ensemble as a bass soloist, and became People's Artist of the USSR. He did a 1996 tour to Japan with the National Opera Theatre of Leningrad, singing in Modest Mussorgsky's opera Boris Godunov. He broadcast with the Don Cossack Choir, and recorded in 1994 and 1995. In 2002 he performed with the Moscow Radio and Television Choir in Korea.

With the Alexandrov Ensemble he recorded Treasured Stone (music: B. Mokrousov; lyrics A. Zharov), Poem of the Ukraine (music: Alexander Alexandrov; lyrics: O. Kolychev), Dark Eyes with A. Molostov, trumpet (trad; arr. Dmitri Oleg Yachinov). He has made many more recordings.

=== Konstantin Grigorievich Gerasimov ===
Soloist of the ensemble. (born 1912). (Russian: Константин Григорьевич Герасимов). People's Artist of Russia (1962); Dramatic baritone soloist. After graduating from the College of Light Industry he studied singing while working as a clerk in charge of plant management. In 1936 he enlisted as an army sniper so as to be allowed into the Alexandrov Ensemble to get musical training and experience. In 1969 he became a leading baritone soloist.

With the Alexandrov Ensemble he recorded The Death of Varyag (music: A. Turischev; lyrics: R. Greynts; E.Studinskaya) (1959/63), Barrow (music: V.Solovev-Sedoy; lyrics: E. Dolmatovskaya), Marine Guard (music: Y. Milutin; lyrics: V.Lebedev-Kumach), Moscow-Beijing (music: B. Muradeli; lyrics: M. Vershinin) (1950), We Are For Peace (music: S. Tulika; lyrics: A. Zharov), Song of the Ballistic Missile duet with A. Sergeev (music: S. Tulika; lyrics: M. Andronov), It's a Long Way to Tipperary (1956), Song of Japan, Our Bodyguard duet with V.V. Puckkov (1951), Near the Border, Song of the Military Alliance (1960), unknown operatic aria, Song of Russia (1960/63).

=== Pyotr Gluboky ===
Pyotr Gluboky (born Volgograd, 1947), bass soloist. From 1967 to 1973 he studied at Gnessin State Musical College. In 1972 he began working as a soloist at the Bolshoi Theatre. He was a Glinka Competition winner in 1973, and in 1974 he won the grand prize in the Toulouse International Competition. He was also professor at the Gnessin State Musical College. He became People's Artist of the USSR. He performed as a guest soloist for the Alexandrov Ensemble on tours to Japan. He recorded with the Bolshoi Theatre company.

=== Valery Petrovich Gorlanov ===
(Russian: Валерий Петрович Горланов), (1929–1977/1978) tenor soloist from 1956 until 1966. With the Alexandrov Ensemble he recorded: Virgin Land (1960), Song of the Defence, Regiment Polka duet with I.S. Bukreev and folk song They say I don't dare . He also worked as the announcer in the ensembles 1950s – 1965 concerts as seen in the ensembles concert footage.

=== Nikolai Timofeyevich Gres ===
Soloist of the ensemble. Born 28 December 1920 in Kobeliaky; died 25 March 2003 in Simferopol. (Russian: Николай Тимофеевич Гресь), tenor soloist. Honoured Artist of Russia (1966). During World War II he sustained an injury resulting in a brain contusion. From 1946 he was a soloist of the Black Sea Fleet Ensemble. From 1955 to 1963 he was a soloist of the Bolshoi Theatre, and his debut with the Bolshoi was 11 February 1956 in Moscow. He then joined the Alexandrov Ensemble until 1973. After leaving the Ensemble he worked briefly in Moscow teaching automobile engineering, then moved to Simferopol in the Ukraine, where he became an administrator in the Simferopol Philharmonic Society. In his last years he suffered poor health and died suddenly in hospital at Simferopol. Some newspaper and magazine articles about Gres are listed at Slovari Yandex. In 2001 in the Crimea a biography of Gres was published under the title The Whole Life with a Song (Всю жизнь – с песней), by I. Turchin (И. Турчин).

With the Alexandrov Ensemble he recorded I was going back from Berlin (music: I. Dunaevsky; lyrics: L. Oshanin) (1966), The Birch Tree (1965) , Truth of the Century (1970), The River Flows (1963), French Marching Song (Походная) lyrics by E.Mugel (1963), My Friends (duet with A.S. Sibirtsev), and Let us remember, comrades (duet with A.S. Sibirtsev 1960s, music A.V.Alexandrov, lyrics S.Alymov), When I go to the quick river (Как пойду я на быструю речку) (1955), The Grey Cuckoo (1965), Obelisks (music: Smolsky; lyrics: Yasen) or Обелиски (Д. Смольский – М. Ясень) (1966), The Song of the Headman from the opera The Night of May by Rimsky-Korsakov or Песня про Голову из оперы "Майская ночь" (Н. Римский – Корсаков) (1955; 1967), I Have Travelled the Whole Universe (1969), also known as I wandered through the world, the part of Sobinin in Ivan Susanin (Life of the Tsar) opera by Glinka. He also recorded Soviet Flag (music: B.A. Alexandrov; lyrics: P.Arsky (П. Арский)) (1969), and Fanikuli-Fanikula (1969).

Critical commentary on a music video featuring Nikolai Gres: Gres sings The Birch Tree on the music video Soviet Army Chorus and Dance Ensemble This is a late medieval composition about a man sitting under a birch tree, whittling and thinking of women. It is usually categorised as a folk song as the name of the composer has been lost. However it is clearly a professional composition of a quality comparative to those of medieval Northern European composers of troubadour songs, such as Dufay and Binchois. This performance is part of the history of the early music revival movement. In the 19th century, rediscovered early music, along with folk music, was usually arranged to be performed in the grand orchestral or Italian operatic style. However, such music had always survived in church music, in one form or another, and people were used to hearing it performed in the style of traditional European church choirs: no vibrato; pure and clear tone; adjusting the voice production to the acoustics of the building. In church music, the building was always the secondary soundbox for the vocal instrument (the nasal cavity being the first). From the 1950s, early music performance reverted to this ecclesiastical style of singing. So the Alexandrov Ensemble performance of ca.1963 was very modern for its time. Gres sings like a church choir baritone, with the same appearance of spiritual joy as any oratorio soloist. The screenshot does not capture such a moment, but it does show the sheer effort that the performance required. His voice is responding to a building-soundbox too; in this case a recording studio. The Russian practice of the time was to film outdoors and then dub the sound later. Studio dubbing tends to appear artificial today, but on this occasion it is advantageous, as the church choral style does need a building-soundbox. From the 1970s, some early music singers, such as the Martin Best Ensemble, started to reflect what may have been the contemporary late medieval performance-style of troubadour songs: that is, the Arab singing style which can still be heard in Islamic sung prayer. Hence Gres' performance now sounds a little dated, but remains nonetheless one of the finest recorded performances of this song.

=== Sergei Vasilievich Ivanov ===
(Russian: Сергей Васильевич Иванов), tenor soloist. Honoured Artist of Russia. With the Alexandrov Ensemble he recorded In the Ocean Gave duet with P. Bogachev (music: B. Korostylev; lyrics: B. Bezhaev), It's a Long Time Since We Were Home duet with P. Bogachev (music: V.Solovev-Sedoy; lyrics: A. Fatyanov), We, the Army People duet with P. Bogachev (music: G. Movsesyan; lyrics: Robert Rozhdestvensky), Listen, Beauty duet with P. Bogachev (music: E. Martin; lyrics: M. Plyatskovsky), Soldier System solo (music: I. Yakushenko; lyrics: A. Shaferan), Your Soldiers duet with P. Bogachev (music: B. Gamal; lyrics: A. Sofronov), Smuglianka, duet with P. Bogachev (music: A. Novikov; lyrics: Y. Chvedov) , The Samovars duet with P. Bogachev (music A. Novikov; lyrics: S. Alimov) (1982/92) , Endless Sea duet with P. Bogachev, The Hero Walks in the Urals solo (1983), Who Protects the Country duet with P. Bogachev, Afield duet with P. Bogachev (1992), Nut Brown Girl duet with P. Bogachev (1989/92, 2003), Evening on the Roads duet with P. Bochachev 1992, Distant Northern Town trio with S.V. Buzurov and P. Bogachev (1992), Dixie duet with P. Bogachev (1992), Greetings from the Troops duet with P. Bogachev, unknown duet with V. Gavva (1992), Our Army duet with P. Bogachev (1984).

Critical commentary on a music video featuring Ivanov and Bogachev: They sing Smuglianka in the DVD Silva America, The Alexandrov Red Army Choir Orchestra – Live in Paris. This performance displays the modern aspect of the Ensemble: performers who are still very much part of the choir, and who still sing in the traditional soldierly, undramatic style, but who are now free to exchange little smiles with the audience, the conductor and each other, as seen in the screenshot – partly reflecting the light subject-matter of the song, and partly in polite acknowledgement of their worldwide popularity as duettists. These are trained and professional singers, who can still perform a light-hearted song in the same intimate manner as lads in a student bar, and this creates immediate empathy in the audience. This is professional singing with an effect as light as air. These performers are able to demonstrate very gently the plane on which musicians live while on stage: the kind of musical ecstasy which only happens when a performance goes just right.

=== Vladimir Nikolaevich Katerinsky ===
(Russian: Катеринский, Владимир Николаевич) (1920–?) Baritone soloist from 1949 until the 1950s. He performed a few solos and a few duets with soloists like Viktor Nikitin, Oleg Razumovsky, Ivan Kuznetsov, Nikolai Abramov and many others.

He recorded with the Alexandrov Ensemble: unknown duet with N.A. Abramov (1954), Siberian Child Went to War, Evening on the Roads with V.I. Nikitin, Mary (1951). Rice (1951) and Pilots March

=== Leonid Kharitonov ===
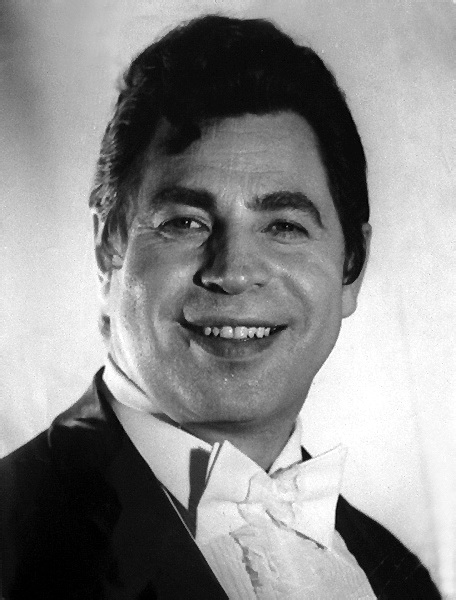
Leonid Kharitonov 1970s

Soloist of the ensemble. (Golumet, Irkutsk Oblast 1933 – Moscow 19 September 2017). (Russian: Л.М. Харитонов). People's Artist of Russia, Honoured Artist of Russia; bass-baritone soloist. Known as Lenya Kharitonov. When his father went missing in World War II, his mother brought him up. At the age of 14yrs he studied locally to be a welder, and began to perform as a singer. At 17 years old he started auditioning at Irkutsk Philharmonic, then at Moscow Philharmonic, and finally was accepted by Moscow Conservatory. This was very difficult because as a Siberian he did not have even a matriculation certificate, but his strong singing voice spoke for him. For nearly 20 years he was a member of the Red Song and Dance Ensemble of the Soviet army (later the Alexandrov Ensemble): in the choir from 1953 to 1965, and a soloist from 1965 to 1972. He subsequently became a soloist with the Moscow Philharmonic. He performed successfully in most concert halls in Russia: On tour he visited the entire country, including the Kremlin Palace concert hall. He was the pride of Russia, sang at concerts for the Government and for foreign delegations. After that he went on tour abroad a great deal.

With the Alexandrov Ensemble he recorded The Ballad of the Russian Boy (music: Novikov; lyrics: Oshanin L.), John Reid Goes to Petrograd (music: Novikov; lyrics: M. Vershinin), It is Not the End of the War (music: B. Muradeli; lyrics: M. Andronov), Here Lenin Lived (music: B. Terentiev; lyrics: A. Fatyanov), Lenin's Guard (music: B Aleksandrov; lyrics: M Khotimsk), My Native Land (music: O. Feltsman; lyrics: Oshanin L.), Not Old Soul Veterans (music: Tulika S.; lyrics: Y. Belinsky), Song of Peace (music: B. Muradeli; lyrics: V. Kharitonov), Grey Hair (music: A. Ekimyan; lyrics: F. Laube), Son of the Fatherland (music: S. Tulika; lyrics: V. Lazarev), The Song of Russia (music: St. Tulika; lyrics: V. Kharitonov), Song of the Volga Boatmen Death of Varyag

=== Ivan Semyonovich Kozlovsky ===
Ivan Semyonovich Kozlovsky (Russian: Иван Семёнович Козловский). (b. Mali, Poltava, Ukraine 1900; d. 1993); a lyric tenor. Order of the National Anthem (1941); People's Artist of the USSR (1940). He made his debut at the Kharkiv Opera Theatre. From 1926 to 1954 he was a member of the Bolshoi Theatre. He was professor at Gnessin State Musical College 1956 to 1980, continuing over the age of 80. In Russia has been considered the best tenor in the first half of the 20th century. From the 1920s he recorded opera. In the 1950s with the Alexandrov Ensemble he recorded martial music and Russian folk songs, including Song of the Red Navy (1953), In Front of the Forest, and Raw Wilderness. Nikita Khrushchev said in his autobiography that Kozlovsky was Joseph Stalin's favourite tenor and that Koszlovsky was unhappy about this.

=== Andrey Matveyevich Kusleev ===
(Russian: Андрей Матвеевич Куслеев), bass-baritone soloist. Born in 1904. Since the late 1930s, he has been active as a soloist in the All-Soviet Union Central Council of Trade Unions Song and Dance Ensemble (Russian-Records.ru where you can listen to a recording of 1941, immediately after the outbreak of the Great Patriotic War.), and after the war, he became a soloist in the Air Force Song and Dance Ensemble. After the ensemble disbanded in 1953, he joined the Alexandrov Ensemble, where he was a soloist until 1965 and a choir member from 1965.

In 1962 he was awarded the title of Meritorious Artist of the Republic of the Russian Federation. He left the ensemble in 1967 and died in 1976 and was buried at the Vagankovskoye cemetery in Moscow. With the Alexandrov Ensemble he recorded Cold Waves Lapping duet with E. Belyaev (music: F. Bogoroditsky; lyrics: Ya Repninsky), Shooting Kommunarov duet with E. Belyaev (music: V.Tan-Bogoraz), a duet with Abramov, Execution of the Warrior Revolution duet with E. Belyaev, Marching song duet with Ivan A. Didenko, Song of the Red Army Cavalry (recorded 1954), Travel Far duet with Vladimir V. Puchkov.

=== Ivan Flippovich Kuznetsov ===
(Russian: Иван Филиппович Кузнецов),(1909–1982) tenor soloist. Born in 1909 in the village of Ilovka, Bilyuchensky District, Voronezh Oblast. Began singing as an amateur while working in a kolkhoz. After serving in the Red Army from 1931 to 1935, he studied vocal music at the Voronezh Musical College and then at the Moscow Conservatory. From 1937 to 1938, he was a soloist at the Bolshoi Theater, and then the Alexandrov Ensemble. In 1949, he was awarded the Order of the Red Banner of Labor and the title of Honored Artist of the Republic of the Russian Federation. In 1954, he left the ensemble and became director of the Tchaikovsky Museum in Klin. He died in Moscow in 1982. With the Alexandrov Ensemble he recorded Saw the Father and Son (music: (Russian: Компанеец Z.); lyrics: Y. Shvedov) I Have Travelled All Over The Universe, Oh you night, Motherland and Bandura duet with Vladimir Fydorov.

=== Edward Maxovich Labkovsky ===
Edward Maxovich Labkovsky (born in Kazakhstan 24 July 1938 (Russian: Эдуард Максович Лабковский), Baritone soloist. Honoured Artist of Russia (1978); People's Artist of Russia (1988). He moved to Moscow aged 3yrs, after his father, a Soviet official, died. There he worked in an aircraft factory as a fitter-assembler before attending Gnessin State Musical College as a singer instructed by A. Adana. After graduation he took part in a Puccini opera at Moscow Conservatory, did a tour singing across the country from Transdniestria to Sakhalinthen, then joined the Ensemble in 1972. On behalf of the Ensemble, he travelled the country performing solos with a sextet of musicians from the orchestra, and entertaining troops where they were in service. He also performed on film and television, but has been ill recently.

With the Alexandrov Ensemble, he recorded Take an Overcoat (music: V. Levashov; lyrics: B. Okudzhava), The Entire Country – It is Our Job (music: B. Terentiev; lyrics: V. Kharitonov), Hot Snow (music: A. Pakhmutova; lyrics: M. Lvov) (1980), Victory Day (music: D. Tuhmanov; lyrics: V. Kharitonov) (1992), Conductors of War (music: B. Figotin; lyrics F. Laube), Otgremeli Near Moscow has Long Battles (music: A. Kukushkin; lyrics: B. Zishenkova), Paratroopers' Song (music: M. Minkov; lyrics: I. Shaferan), Letter From the Depths (music: B. (Russian: Калистратов); lyrics: M. Reytman), Under the Balkan Stars (music: M. Blanter; lyrics: M. Isakovsky), Before it is Too Late (music: A. Pakhmutova; lyrics: N. Dobronravov), Soldiers' Ways duet with Ivan Bukreev (music: B. Aleksandrov; lyrics: B. Dubrovin), Fifth Ocean (music: W. Korostelev; lyrics: B. Bezhaev), Home Country (music: G. Movsesyan; lyrics: B. Gin), Forties (music: I. Katayev; lyrics: D. Samoylov), Tulskaya Defence (music: Novikov; lyrics: V. Guryan), The Shield and Sword (P. Ovsiannikov – S. Volkov), Men (1978), Take the Mantle (1975), Commissars (1980), Parachute Song, The Russians Want War? (1989), Separation, My Country

=== Konstantin Pavlovich Lisovsky ===
Konstantin Pavlovich Lisovsky (born Leningrad 22 October 1932). Fine tenor soloist. (Russian: К.П. Лисовский); also translated as Lissovsky, Lisovskiy or Lisovski. (People's Artist of Russia (1983), winner of competitions named after Glinka and Tchaikovsky. In 1951 he graduated from the Gorky Aviation Technical School and was sent to the factory. In 1953 was accepted into the Moscow Conservatory where he studied for three years. From 1954 he did military service and sang in the Alexandrov Ensemble, then from 1965 to 1997 he was soloist for the Moscow State Academic Philharmonic Society. In 1967 he graduated from Gnessin State Musical College. He was winner of the Glinka All-Union vocalists' competition (1965) and the International Tchaikovsky Competition (1966). He sang a wide repertoire besides opera, and performed in more than 30 countries. He has performed on the radio, and recorded on vinyl and CDs. Since 1980, he has taught at the Russian Academy of Music (associate professor since 1989). One of his recordings is Golden Lights (music: V. Solovev-Sedoy; lyrics: A. Fatyanov, S. Fogelson)

With the Alexandrov Ensemble he recorded: The Birch Tree (trad; arr. Dmitri Oleg Yachinov).

=== Yuseph Grigorievich Laut (Oizer Gershovich Laut) ===
(Russian: Юсеф Григорьевич Лаут), (1901–1982) tenor soloist.

Honored Artist of the RSFSR (1949). Born in Ukraine in Nikolaev in a musical family. Awarded the Order of the Red Banner of Labor (1949). One of the first soloists of the ensemble.

He graduated from the Kherson Music College. In 1921 he entered the Kharkov Conservatory. From 1926 he worked at the Nikolaev Operetta Theatre, and in 1928 he passed the competition to the Stanislavsky Theatre.

He joined the Red Banner Ensemble in October 1929. In 1931, he left the group due to illness. Then he worked as a solo singer in the State Variety Show. In 1936, he returned to the main army ensemble.

During his tour in Paris in 1937, he performed E. Migul's "Marching Song" superbly. His repertoire included Russian folk songs ("I've Traveled the Entire Universe", "In the Forge"), A. Varlamov's song "The Snowstorm", songs by Soviet composers: B.A. Alexandrov's "Song of Chkalov" (with I. Kuznetsov, G. Babayev and N. Ustinov), "Kavaleriyskaya-Budennovskaya" (with G. Babayev and V. Petrov), A. Novikov's "Soldier's Tunes" (with G. Babayev and S. Tibaev), and Yu. Shaporin's cantata "On the Kulikovo Field" (together with N. Pashutin).

Awarded the badge "Participant of the Khasan battles". Active participant in front-line concert brigades during the Great Patriotic War.

After completing his solo work, he sang in the choir.

In 1956 he retired and was dismissed from the team.

With the Alexandrov Ensemble he recorded Song of the Klim Voroshilov duet with Georgiy Babaev (music: Alexander Alexandrov; lyrics: O. Kolychev), Artillery March duet with Oleg Razumovsky (music: Novikov; lyrics: S. Vasiliev). Song about the Headman from the May Night Opera.

=== Alexei Pavlovich Martynov ===
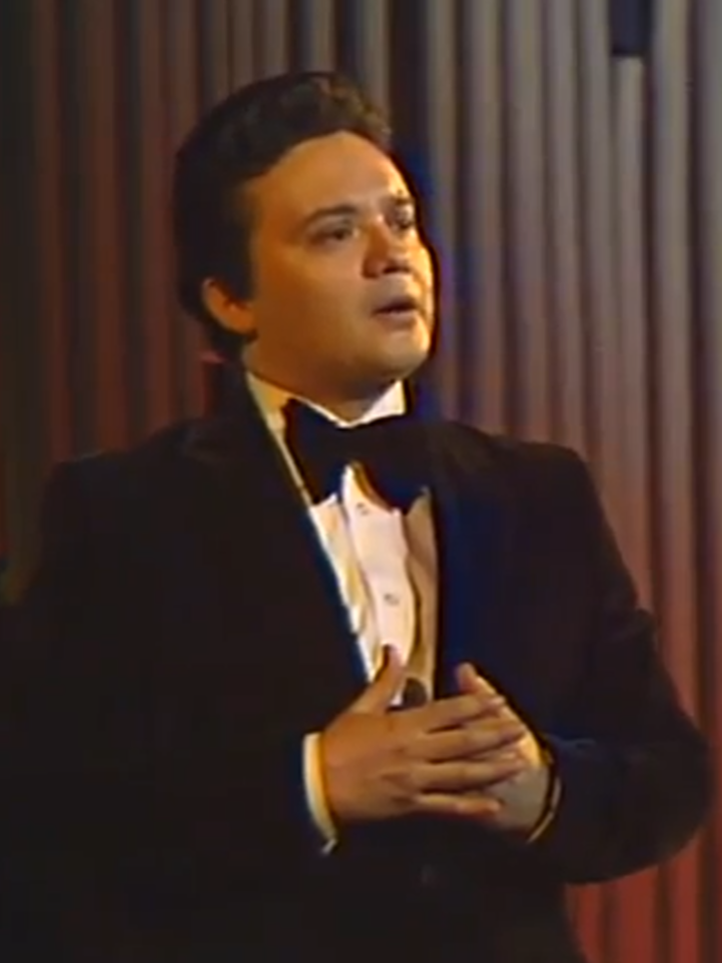
Alexei Pavlovich Martynov

Alexei Pavlovich Martynov (born Moscow 4 March 1947). (Russian: Алексей Павлович Мартынов; also translated as Martinov and Martinoff), tenor soloist. (People's Artist of Russia (2003), Professor of the Moscow Conservatory, Laureate of international competitions). He graduated from Gnessin State Musical College in 1970 with a diploma for violin. In 1976 he graduated with honours from the Moscow Conservatory as a singer. Since 1972 he has recorded for the Radio and Television in the USSR and Russia, totalling many hours of music: opera, operetta, oratorio, cantata, duets, romances and songs of composers of the 18th, 19th and 20th centuries, folk songs, recordings of symphonic, chamber, folk, and pop music, and with instrumental ensembles. He won second prize at the International Vocal Competition in Budapest, Hungary in 1975, and fourth prize at the International Vocal Competition in Aldeburgh, UK in 1978. He was a member of the international jury of the Dmitry Shostakovich contest at Hanover, Germany, in 1997. He is involved with the Shubert Society in Moscow.

With the Alexandrov Ensemble he recorded In a Sunny Forest Clearing (music: V.Solovev-Sedoy; lyrics: A. Fatyanov), The Roads (music: A. Novikov; lyrics: L. Ochanine; arr. V. Samsonenko), Nightingales etc...

=== Mikhail Mikhailov ===
tenor soloist. With the Ensemble of the All-Union Radio Committee under Boris Alexandrov he recorded Evening in the Roadstead/Night on the Road duet with Vladimir Bunchikov (recorded 1942) This is a bass-baritone–tenor duet, and the choir includes women sopranos.

In most of his recordings he uses a light voice suitable for radio or film, but in some, such as Boat, Mihailov exhibits the kind of powerful tenor, favoured by the Alexandrov Ensemble, to be heard above the choir and orchestra.

=== Victor Ivanovich Nikitin ===
(Russian: Виктор Иванович Никитин), tenor soloist, born in Syzran 1911 and died in Moscow 1994. He joined the Ensemble around 1938. He was already known as "Mr Kalinka" before World War II. He recorded many songs with the Alexandrov Ensemble, including Song of the Red Fleet Sailors (recorded 1943) and Kalinka. Legend in Russia says that when he sang to entertain the Russian troops at the Eastern Front in World War II, the Germans on the other side stopped shooting to listen. At the Alexandrov Ensemble August 1948 Peace Concert in East Berlin, he sang encores of Kalinka and received high praise. He returned to the Ensemble choir in 1952, by his own choice, and remained with the Ensemble until at least 1965. He recorded Ich Freue Mich Ihnen Mein Lied Zu Singen in 1988, saying that it was 40 years after the 1948 peace concert in Berlin.

=== Vasily Kuzmich Pankov ===
(Russian: Василий Кузьмич Панков), tenor soloist. Born 1903

Tenor. From October 1934, he was a soloist with the Alexandrov Ensemble. During the Great Patriotic War, he went to the front as a member of a comfort troupe. He was awarded the Order of Honor in 1939, and the Order of the Red Banner of Labor and the title of Honored Artist of the Republic of the Russian Federation in 1949. After retiring as a soloist, he worked as a member of a choir, and left the ensemble in March 1958. *The year of award of the title is from the article on Honored Artists of the Republic of the Russian Federation

With the Alexandrov Ensemble he recorded Song about Blyukher (music: Alexander Alexandrov; lyrics: S. Alymov); Vasya – Vasilyok (music: Anatoly Novikov; lyrics: Sergei Alymov) duet with Georgiy Babaev.

=== Nikolay Sergeevich Polozkov ===
(Russian: Николай Сергеевич Полозков) (born in Kharkov, Ukraine, in 1933)

Tenor soloist of the Alexandrov Ensemble and later on soloist of the Pyatnitsky Choir.

With the Alexandrov Ensemble he recorded: Ah Lovely Night (1956).

Honored Artist of the RSFSR. He was accepted into the Alexandrov Ensemble of the Soviet Army in May 1957 as a choir singer.

=== Leonid Viktorovich Pshenichniy ===
(Russian: Леонид Викторович Пшеничный), tenor soloist (People's Artist of Russia). With the Alexandrov Ensemble, he recorded Birch Dreams (music: B. Geviksman; lyrics: G. Fere), In the Dugouts (music: K. sheets; lyrics: A. Surkov), Where Are You Now, Odnopolchane Friends? (music: V.Solovev-Sedoy; lyrics: A. Fatyanov), Let Lit (music: M. Tabachnikov; lyrics: I. Frenkel), Katyusha (music: M. Blanter; lyrics: M. Isakovsky), My Favourite (music: M. Blanter; lyrics: E. Dolmatovskaya), Parade of Victory (music: V. Pleshakov; lyrics: B. Levtov), Oh, the Road (music: Novikov; lyrics: Oshanin L.), My Country (trad; arr. B. Alexandrov).

=== Vsevolod Vsevolodovich Puchkov ===
(Russian: Всеволод Всеволодович Пучков), tenor soloist (later Mariinsky Theatre soloist). With the Alexandrov Ensemble in the 1940s and 1950s he recorded Song of Peace and Friendship (music: B. Shainsky, M. Jordan; lyrics: M. Lisyansky), Song of the Young Soldiers (music: P. Akulenko; lyrics: Ya Shvedov) (1950), Long live our Country (music: Boris Alexandrov; lyrics: A. Shilov) duet with Georgiy Babaev, unknown operatic aria (1951), Travel Far, Ten Thousand Years of Our Country duet with G.I. Babaev (1951), In a Sunny Forest Clearing, Russia, unknown song (1954), Our Bodyguard duet with K.G. Gerasimov (1951).

=== Oleg Nikolaevich Razumovsky ===
(Russian: Олег Николаевич Разумовский), (1919–1996) Representative baritone soloist of the ensemble from 1940 to the mid 50s/early 60s?. With Georgy Vinogradov he recorded We Assumed Polsveta (music: S. Katz; lyrics: A. Sofronov). With the Alexandrov Ensemble in the 1940s to 1960s he recorded American Soldiers' Song (music: B. Hills), In the Battle for the Motherland (music: Компанеец Z.; lyrics: L. Oshanin), In a good hour! (music: K. sheets; lyrics: A. Zharov), Goodbye, Mom (music: V.Solovev-Sedoy; lyrics: A. Galić), Pub (music: B. Hills), As for the Kama, the River (music: V.Solovev-Sedoy; lyrics: Vladimir Gusev), Krasnoflotskaya Smile (music: N. Budashkin; lyrics: A. Fidrovsky), Swallow-Kasatochka (music: E. Zharkovsky; lyrics: O. Kolychev), Artillery March duet with Yuseph Laute (music: Novikov; lyrics: S. Vasiliev), Sailor's Waltz (music: V. Sorokin; lyrics: S. Fogelson), It's a Long Way to Tipperary (music: D. Judge; lyrics S. Bolotin), Night (Music: L.D. Utesov; lyrics: I. Fradkin), Eternal Glory to our Hero duet with B.G. Shapenko, Dance Dance, Echo Across the River, Farewell, Song of the Coachman, Song of the Unified (1949), When We Part

=== Mark Reizen ===
Mark Reizen

Bass soloist at the Mariinsky Theatre and Bolshoi Theatre. With the Alexandrov Ensemble he recorded The Fond Stone, Oh The Road ( Ekh, dorogi ) transmitted on Soviet All-Union radio in 1947, Song of the Volga Boatmen (trad; arr. Dmitri Oleg Yachinov).

=== Vadim Lvovich Ruslanov ===
(Russian: Вадим Львович Русланов), (July 13, 1926, July 29, 1996). Soloist of the nsemble. People's Artist of the USSR (1974); Baritone soloist. He was born into a family of artists from the Vakhtangov Theatre; he attended drama school, and became an actor attached to a Moscow theatre. However he still had a passion for music and studied at Gnessin State Musical College. He joined the Alexandrov Ensemble in 1958. With the Alexandrov Ensemble during the 1960s and 1970s he recorded: And the Song Goes to War (music: M. Fradkin; lyrics: C. Islands), Cranes (music: J. Frenkel; Lyrics: R. Gamzatov), Solidarity March (music: S. Tulika; lyrics: A. Sofronov), A Peaceful Country (music: A. Averkin; lyrics: A. Turkin), Angels Brothers or Brothers in Heaven (music: A. Averkin; lyrics: P. Gradov) (ca.1965), Invisible Soldiers of the Front (music: Novikov; lyrics: P. Gradov), Song of the Faraway Homeland (music: M. Tariverdiyev; lyrics: Robert Rozhdestvensky), Victory (music: V. Shainsky; lyrics: L. Oshanin), Regimental Band duet with Vadim V. Shkaptsov (music: L. Lyadov; lyrics: G. Hodos), Do You Hear Me, Paris (music: A. Ostrovsky; lyrics: L. Oshanin), Soldiers Pribautki duet with E. Belyaev (music: A. Doluhanyan; lyrics: G. Hodos), A Soldier is Always a Soldier (music: V.Solovev-Sedoy; lyrics: M. Matusovsky) (1960/68), Oh No John, Ballad of the Eternal, Dance Dance (1975), Take the Field Mantle and Let's go Home. (1976/80), The Wind Sounds (1966), He is a Man, Kutuzov's Heart, Military Musicians, And the Murderers Roam the Earth (1965), Farewell Love (1966), Third Battalion, Voices of the Earth, Song of Unity, The Sentry at Post, I Believe my friends, Paris, Old Soldier's Song, Bravo the Soldiers (1969), Song of Friendship, World Peace, Daughter is Water (1966), The Stone (1973), Rocket Troops March, Ready Rocket Forces duet with I.S. Bukreev, Do the Russians want a war? (1963/64/75), Song of Russia (ca.1965), Song of the Russian Soldiers, Our Country Russia (1960).

=== Ensign Victor Sanin ===
Sanin died in the 25 December 2016 plane crash.

=== Ivan Ivanovich Savchuk ===
(Russian: Иван Иванович Савчук), tenor soloist. With the Alexandrov Ensemble in 1953 he recorded Smuglyanka duet with Nikolai Abramov (music: Novikov; lyrics: Ya Shvedov), Dark Eyes (1956), Sweet Fruit, Nut-Brown Girl (1953, 1956), Nut Brown Maiden duet with N. Abramov (1956) , Happy Girl, Near the Garden trio with I.S. Bukreev and E. Belyaev, Bandura both as solo and as duet with V. Fedorov (1951/56) , I Look Up at the Sky, Black Eyebrows (1956).

=== Alexei Tikhonovich Sergeev ===
(See also: Russian Wikipedia article about A.T. Sergeev)
Alexei Tikhonovich Sergeev soloist of the Ensemble. (Russian: Алексей Тихонович Сергеев). Born 24 January 1919 in Gerasimovka in the Tambov region of Russia. People's Artist of the USSR (1967), State Prize of the USSR. Graduated from Gnessin State Musical College. From the 1950s to 1968 he was bass singer with the Alexandrov Ensemble; promoted to soloist 1950. Performed in recitals from 1968. With the Alexandrov Ensemble he recorded Ballad of the Tank (music: IE Zharkovsky; lyrics: Yuri Kamenetsky; M. Kravchuk) (1951?), Memoirs of Algiers (music: B. Muradeli; lyrics: E. Dolmatovskaya), Duma of the Motherland (music: S. Tulika; lyrics: V. Malkov), Stars Lovely Homeland (music: I. Dunaevsky; lyrics: M. Matusovsky) (1965?), Nothing Was Said (music: V.Solovev-Sedoy; lyrics: A. Fatyanov), On the Rocks, Granite Rocks (music: B. Terentiev; lyrics: AN Bukin), Bryansky Partisan Song duet with E. Belyaev (music: D. Kabalevsky; lyrics: V.Lebedev-Kumach), Song of the Ballistic Missile (music: S. Tulika; lyrics: M. Andronov), Third Battalion (music: B. Mokrousov; lyrics: A. Fatyanov), Soldiers Carry Out the Order (music: O. Feltsman; lyrics: V. Sergeev), Stenka Razin (1951/56/63) Along Peterskaya Road/Street (trad; arr. Dmitri Oleg Yachinov) (1956/60/66) Ah Nastasia (trad; arr. B. Alexandrov) (1968); unknown operatic aria, Song of the Volga Boatmen, Ukrainian Poem (1956/60/63) See the Village, unknown song, Under the Elm, Under the Oak (1963, 2007), Can You Hear Me Brother, Marching Song, Cossack Cossack, Work Song (1956), Her Son-in-Law, Cheesecake, If I Had a Hammer (1956), The Motto of the Struggle, Uncle (1951), Red Sun (1960), Rain, Bryansk Forest, Old Urals, Soldier's Farewell, Star, Song of the Poplar, Groove, Ballad of the Moscow Boy, The Little Bells, Night, Spend an Evening (1977), Lenin Lived Here, Story of Russia, Only Russia. He is buried in Moscow, not far from his fellow soloist Evgeny Belyaev, in a section of Novodevichy Cemetery affiliated branch (Russian: Новоде́вичье кла́дбище) located in Kuntsevo District.

=== Boris Grigorievich Shapenko ===
Soloist of the ensemble. (Russian: Борис Григорьевич Шапенко), Baritone soloist of the Bolshoi Theatre. Honoured Artist of Russia. With the Alexandrov Ensemble in the 1960s he recorded It is the Soviet Navy (music: K. Sheets; lyrics: V. Guryan), Song of the Volga Boatmen (music: M. Fradkin), The Long-Range Guns Are Silent (music: M. Blanter; lyrics: M. Matusovsky), Rodina (music: S. Tulika; lyrics: Yu Polukhin), Evening on the Road/Night on the Road (1980s) duet with E. Belyaev (music: V.Solovev-Sedoy; lyrics: A. Churkin), Eternal Glory duet with O.N. Razumovsky, Song of the Red Army Cavalry, Country, unknown opera aria, Spring in Berlin (1965), The Fun and Joy (1969), Song of Russia.

=== Boris Shemyakov ===
(Russian: Борис Шемяков), bass-baritone soloist from the 1970s onward. With the Alexandrov Ensemble he recorded: Sailors March duet with V. Shkaptsov, Spring 1945 duet with I.S. Bukreev, Hawks.

=== Vladimir Efimovich Shkaptsov ===
Soloist of the choir. (Russian:Владимир Ефимович Шкапцов), Lyric Baritone / tenor soloist in the 1960s and 1970s.

In 1957 he graduated from Gnessin State Musical College.

With the Alexandrov Ensemble he recorded: Regimental Band duet with Vadim Ruslanov (music: L. Lyadov; lyrics: G. Hodos), Sailors March duet with B. Shemyakov, Song of the March-Past duet with A.S. Sibirtsev, Hail to the Infantry! duet with V. Chernykh.

=== Vasily Ivanovich Shtefutsa ===
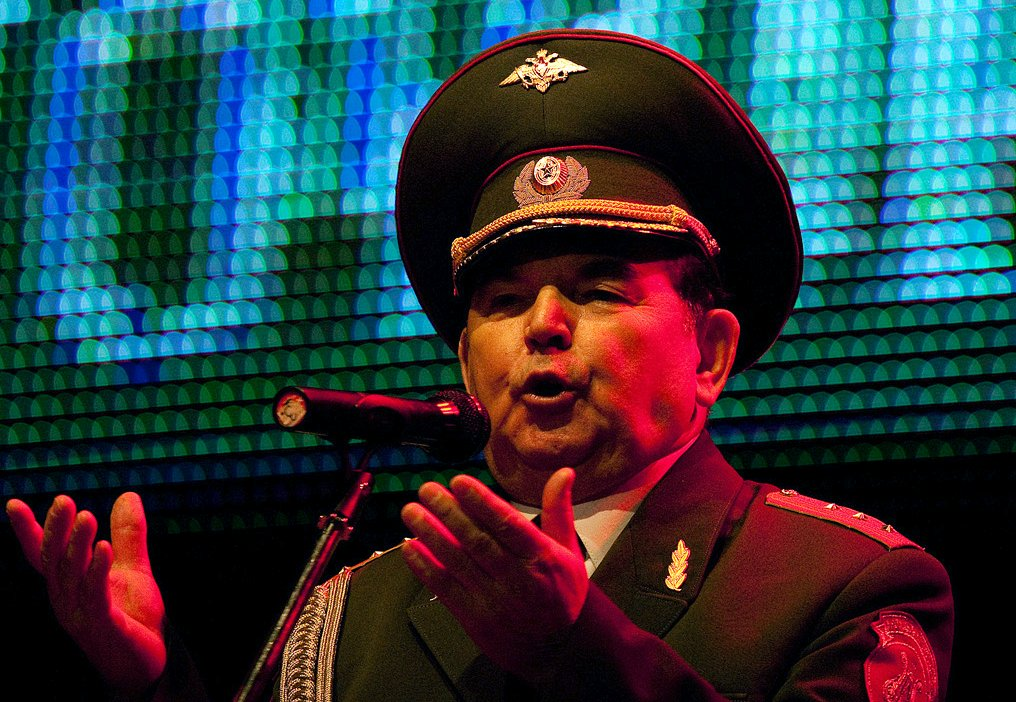
Vasily Shtefutsa

Also spelled Chtefoutsa. (Russian: Василий Иванович Штефуца), current tenor soloist. People's Artist of the USSR (1993). From a farming family in Ukraine. He sang in the choir of the Uzhhorod School of Music, then attended Gnessin State Musical College, graduating in 1965. With the Alexandrov Ensemble he was at first in the choir, then as a soloist from 1970 he recorded You are One of Us (music: A. Doluhanyan; lyrics: M. Lisyansky), Moscow (music: D. Tuhmanov; lyrics: B. Dubrovin), Kalinka and Korobeiniki (both trad.; arr. Dmitri Oleg Yachinov). He won a prize in the Polish song festival of 1972.

=== Alexander Sergeievich Sibirtsev ===
Soloist of the choir. (August 2, 1935, in Simferopol – March 6, 2024, in Samara). (Russian: Александр Сергеевич Сибирцев), baritone and later on dramatic tenor soloist.

People's Artist of the USSR. Studied at Gnessin State Musical College. From 1963 he was a soloist of the Opera and Ballet Theatre in Gorky. In 1964 he spent a year as a soloist of the Alexandrov Ensemble, then became soloist of Perm and Samara Opera. With the Alexandrov Ensemble he recorded: My Friends duet with N. T. Gres, unknown song duet with N. T. Gres, Song of the March-Past with N. T. Shkaptsov.

=== P.G Slastnoi ===
With the Alexandrov Ensemble he recorded Bella Ciao duet with I. Bukreev (Italian partisan song; arr. B. Pogrebov)

=== Anatoly Borisovich Solovyanenko ===
Anatoly Borisovich Solovyanenko, guest soloist. (Donetsk, Ukraine, 25 September 1932 – 29 July 1999; Ukrainian: Анатолій Борисович Солов'яненко, Russian: Анатолий Борисович Соловьяненко). People's Artist of the USSR (before 1978), People's artist of Ukraine, State Taras Shevchenko prize-winner. He was born into a mining family, and graduated from Donetsk Polytechnic Institute in 1954, having taken singing lessons at Olexander Korobeichenko from 1950. He began his career in Donetsk, where there is now a monument in his memory. He did 12 performances at the Metropolitan Opera in Kiev, then graduated from Kiev Conservatory in 1978. For 30 years he was soloist at the Taras Shevchenko National Opera and Ballet Theatre in Kiev, and performed at Expo 67 in Montreal.

He performed as soloist for Alexandrov Ensemble during its UK tour 1988, singing Kalinka and others. He recorded 18 LPs: arias, romances and songs.

=== Ivan Stolyar ===
Ivan Stolyar Kostroma, 16 September 1977 – 25 December 2016). Bass-baritone. Graduated from the A. Schnittke Moscow State Institute of Music in 2002. He was a soloist of the Tver Philharmonic from 1999 to 2000, then joined the Ensemble in 2005. As of 2010 he sings for the Ensemble as a guest soloist. With the Ensemble he has performed in various concerts including Quebec 2008, where he sang the song known in the west as Those Were the Days, but which is a Russian song called Дорогой длинною or By the Long Road by Boris Fomin. Died in the 25 December plane crash.

=== Anatoly Antonovich Syrovatko-Zolotarev ===
(Russian: Анатолий Сыроватко-Золотарёв), (1917– 1975) tenor soloist.

Anatoly Antonovich Syrovatko-Zolotaryov – singer, opera actor (tenor). A participant of the Great Patriotic War. Soloist of the Bolshoi Theater of the USSR. Opera soloist at the Molotovsky (Perm) Tchaikovsky Academic Opera and Ballet Theater.

Anatoly Antonovich Syrovatko (Zolotaryov) was born on May 26, 1917, in a small village near Donetsk. In the village everyone sang, Anatoly sang too; he sang better than others, sounding better, more beautiful, but he did not attach any importance to it. He wanted to fly like the great Valery Chkalov.

After several years of study, Anatoly Syrovatko's dream came true: he became a military fighter pilot.

When the Great Patriotic War began, Anatoly Antonovich was drafted into the active army, and he took part in many air battles. During the Battle of Stalingrad, his fighter had to participate in a battle against five “Messerschmitts”. The pilot was shot down, but wounded and burned, he managed to eject. After hospitalization Syrovatko returned to the front as a tank commander, participated in the battles for the Dnieper, and in 1944 in Romania was again seriously wounded.

With the Alexandrov Ensemble he recorded Coming Back from Berlin (music: I. Dunaevsky; lyrics: L. Oshanin).

=== Barseg Robertovich Tumanyan ===
Barseg Tumanyan, guest soloist. (born Yerevan 1958). Renowned Armenian bass soloist. (Russian: Б.Р. Туманян) (People's Artist of Armenia, soloist of Yerevan Opera and the Metropolitan Opera, the winner of the Tchaikovsky contest). With the Alexandrov Ensemble in ca.1960 he sang Granada and the Toreador Song from Bizet's Carmen, and received a seemingly endless ovation In 2008 he celebrated his 50th anniversary as a bass soloist with the Opera. In 2007 Tumanyan was interviewed by M. Zatikyan.

=== Alexei Ivanovich Usmanov ===
Alexei Ivanovich Usmanov (Moscow 1916 – 1990). (Russian: Алексей Усманов), tenor soloist. He began singing in the amateur choir of the Automobile Club before World War II. He wanted to join the choir of the All-Union Radio, but World War II began. As a soldier he fought bravely when an armoured personnel carrier was hit; for this he was awarded the Order of the Red Star. In the late 1940s he became a soloist of All-Union Radio, and in the early 1960s began to record duets with Victor Selivanov.

With the Alexandrov Ensemble he recorded You Often Write Soldier (music: B. Terentiev; lyrics: S. Bencken). In 1954 he took part in a recording of The Enchantress by Pyotr Tchaikovsky with the Moscow Philharmonia State Orchestra and Radio USSR chorus.

=== Georgi Pavlovich Vinogradov ===
(Russian: Г.П. Виноградов), tenor soloist (Kazan 16 November 1908 – Moscow 11 November 1980). Honoured Artist of Russia (1949). From about 1937 he sang jazz, opera and Soviet lyric songs on Radio Moscow and in World War II he sang with the USSR Committee of Defense Model Orchestra. From 1943 to 1951 he was a soloist with the Alexandrov Ensemble; however in 1951 there was apparently a bar-room brawl which embarrassed the Soviet government, and finished his career. See his own page for further information.

With the Alexandrov Ensemble he recorded Two Maxims (recorded 1943) , Oh the Road , In a Forest at the Front (recorded 1945), Nightingale (recorded 1950), Dark Night (recorded 1945). In the 1940s he also recorded Nightingale as a duet with the baritone Vladimir Bunchikov, and The Bending Branch (Luchina) (То не ветер ветку клонит (Лучина)) as a solo with the Alexandrov Ensemble

=== Igor Fedorovich Volkov ===
(Russian: Игорь Федорович Волков) (Bass soloist of the Novosibirsk Opera House). He sang with the Alexandrov Ensemble in the 1970s and 1980s, and performed Dark Eyes/Black Eyes (1978).

=== Boris Grigorievich Zhaivoronok ===
Boris Grigorievich Zhayvoronok (born 1938) (Russian: Борис Григорьевич Жайворонок) bass-baritone soloist. People's Artist of Russia and Honoured Artist of Ukraine (1972). In 1964 he graduated from the Kharkiv Institute of Arts. From 1965 he was soloist at the Kharkiv Opera and Ballet. He was with the Alexandrov Ensemble 1981–1998 and he recorded The Enemies of the Burned Home (music: M. Blanter; lyrics: M. Isakovsky), My Moscow (music: I.M. Dunaevsky; lyrics: S. Agranyan, M. Lisyansky), Ogonek (lyrics: M. Isakovsky), It is time to Take the Road (music: V.Solovev-Sedoy; lyrics: S. Fogelson), Farewell, Rocky Mountains (music: E. Zharkovsky; lyrics: A.N. Bukin), Troika and Granada.

=== Rostislav Evgenievich Verkhulevskiy ===
(Russian: Ростислав Евгеньевич Верхулевский), Bass soloist. (1887–1973)

Honored Artist of the RSFSR (1939). Worked in the ensemble since 1929. One of the first soloists of the Red Banner ensemble. In 1937 in Paris he performed the song "Volzhskaya Burlakskaya" by A.V. Alexandrov. He was awarded the “Participant in the Khasan Battles” badge, the “Badge of Honor” (1935) and the Red Banner of Labor (1949). In July 1941, due to his age, he was dismissed from the ensemble due to staff reductions. In May 1945 he was re-admitted to the group and sang in the choir until his retirement in September 1953. With the ensemble he recorded Volzhskaya burlatskaya in 1936 and 1937

=== V. Chetverikov ===
(Russian: В. Четвериков), baritone soloist. With the ensemble the soloist only ever performed one song during the 1962 concert in the Tchaikovsky hall, And we'll be living at that time (Music: A. Dolukhanyan, Lyrics: M. Lisyansky. Written 1961)

=== Vasily Petrovich Lyagin ===
(Russian: Василий Петрович Лягин ) Bass soloist (born 1898), Honored Artist of the RSFSR (1949), awarded the Order of the Red Banner of Labor (1949).

Soloist of the Red Banner Ensemble since December 1935. Member of front-line concert brigades during the Great Patriotic War.

Performer of A.V. Alexandrov's songs "Blue Night", "Song of the Motherland", "Volzhskaya Burlakskaya", "For the Great Soviet Land" and others. After finishing his solo work, he sang in the choir for many years. He retired and left the group in January 1959.

Participant of the ensemble's tours in France, Czechoslovakia, Mongolia, Poland, Romania, Bulgaria, Hungary, the GDR, China, England and Yugoslavia. With the ensemble he recorded Golubaya nochen'ka in 1937

=== Veniamin Ivanovich Bycheev ===
(Russian: Вениамин Иванович Бычеев), 1913–1997) Bass soloist. Member of the ensemble from 1939, and soloist from 1949 to 1965 and returning to the choir until he left in 1970.

With the ensemble he recorded Song of Port Arthur (1949), Song of the Soviet Navy(1951) In the dense forests of Siberia, Song of the motherland, Miners March, In the ocean in the sea and Ukrainian Poem. He was also a member of the ensembles octet around the 1950s

=== Alexander Vyacheslavovich Shilov ===
(Russian: Александр Вячеславович Шилов) (June 6, 1906 – 1970) baritone soloist.

With the Ensemble he performed Oh, you wide steppe with Viktor Nikitin (1942), organizer of the ensembles octet, and chronicler of the ensemble. And also writer of the lyrics of the song "Long live our power"

=== Lavrentiy Artemyevich Yaroshenko ===
Lavrentiy Yaroshenko (Russian: Лаврентий Артемьевич Ярошенко) (1909–1975) was a bass soloist. Before entering the operatic stage, he was a worker at the Taganrog plant, where he also played in an amateur drama club, then graduated from the Kharkov flight school (1935) and became a pilot instructor.

In Kharkov, fate brought Yaroshenko to the conservatory class of the oldest professor Pavel Vasilyevich Golubev, where he studied from 1937 to 1941 and sang in the Kharkov Opera, beginning in his second year. During the war, the singer served in the Red Banner Song and Dance Ensemble of Alexandrov, and in 1946 he joined the troupe of the Kirov (Mariinsky) Theater.

Yaroshenko recorded songs such as There Is a Cliff on the Volga, Song of Russia and Bandura (1948)

=== Nikolai Efremovich Ustinov ===
(Russian: Николай Ефремович Устинов) tenor soloist. (1911–1981)

In 1937, he graduated from the Moscow Conservatory, where he studied solo singing under Professor Z.I. Speransky, and three years later, he completed his postgraduate studies under Professor A.L. Dolivo. As a postgraduate student, he worked as a soloist at the Stanislavsky and Nemirovich-Danchenko Music Theater. In 1940, he was drafted into the Red Army. He did his military service in the Red Banner Ensemble of Red Army Song and Dance. He had a beautiful voice with a full range, which allowed him to rise to the ranks of soloists. During the Great Patriotic War, he actively participated in frontline concert brigades. He successfully performed songs by Soviet composers B. Alexandrov (“Song about Chkalov” with O. Laut, I. Kuznetsov, and G. Babaev), A. Novikov (‘Smuglyanka’ with V. Pankov, “Samovars-Samopals” with P. Tverdokhlebov), T. Khrennikov (“There is a Nice Town in the North” with P. Tverdokhlebov and I. Stepanov) and others, Russian folk songs (“Dunya-Tonkopryakha,” “It's Not the Wind That Bends the Branch” with G. Vinogradov), the Persian song (“It Swirls Like a Wave”) by A. Rubinstein, the English song ‘Tipperary’ and the American song “The Cabin”). In April 1946, he resigned from the ensemble due to illness of the vocal apparatus. From 1948, he taught at the solo singing department of the Saratov State Conservatory named after L.V. Sobinov. In 1963–64, he was the dean of this conservatory. In 1972, he was awarded the academic title of associate professor. He trained a galaxy of soloists for the Saratov Opera and Ballet Theatre and other musical ensembles, who were awarded honorary titles. He is the author of a number of scientific and methodological works. He was awarded the medals “For Victory over Germany” (1948), “For Valiant Labor” (1948), and other awards.

With the ensemble he recorded Smuglyanka with Viktor Ivanovich Nikitin (1945) And Evening on the pier duet with Nikitin in Helsinki. (1945)

=== Stepan Alekseyevich Tibaev ===
(Russian: Степан Алексеевич Тибаев) tenor soloist who joined in 1929. With the ensemble he recorded Samovari-Samopal with Viktor Ivanovich Nikitin (1941)

=== Pyotr Afanseyevich Tverdokhlebov ===
(Russian: Петр Афанасьевич Твердохлебов) tenor soloist. (1910–2010s?)

He worked in the group since the 1930s. During the tour in Paris, he brilliantly performed "Serenade" by F. Abt. He was the first performer of the famous "Kalinka", which became the hallmark of the ensemble. His repertoire also included "Troika" by P. Bulakhov and other works. He was an active participant in the front brigades during the Great Patriotic War. He was one of the first performers of the famous song by T. Khrennikov "There is a good town in the north" (with I. Stepanov and N. Ustinov), as well as the song by A. Novikov "Samovars – Samopaly" (with N. Ustinov).

Awarded the badge "Participant of the Khasan battles".

In October 1943 he left the team. He recorded Troika with the ensemble (1941) and Evening on the road duet with V. Glazov.

=== Vladimir Mikhailovich Glazov ===
(Russian: Владимир Михайлович Глазов) baritone soloist. (1915–1980) He was arrested in 1946 for "Anti Soviet Agitation" and sentenced to a labor camp for 4 years.

Baritone. Honored Artist of the Belarusian SSR (1954). In 1937, he was drafted into the Red Army and served in the Red Banner Ensemble. During the Great Patriotic War, he was an active member of frontline concert brigades and rose to become a soloist. He performed the Russian folk song “Varyag,” songs by V. Solovyov-Sedoy “Budyonny's Meeting with the Cossacks” and “Evening on the Roadstead” (with V. Nikitin), and others. In May 1946, he left the ensemble. From 1951 to 1961, he was a soloist at the State Opera and Ballet Theatre of Belarus.

With the ensemble he performed the Evening on the road duet with Pyotr Tverdokhlebov (1942). And Soar falcons with eagles duet with Ivan Taranov (1943) He was also a Bolshoi Theatre soloist later on.

=== Ivan Vasilievich Lugovoy ===
(Russian: Иван Васильевич Луговой) tenor soloist. With the ensemble he performed Dunya tonkopryakha (1938)

=== Viktor Nikolaevich Khvalev ===
(Russian: Виктор Николаевич Хвалёв) dramatic tenor soloist.

Graduate of the Kyiv Conservatory named after P.I. Tchaikovsky. He joined the Soviet Army Ensemble by assignment of the qualification commission in June 1963. He performed the Russian folk song Korobeiniki magnificently. During the ensemble's tour in Italy in February–March 1964, he captivated the audiences of Milan, Bologna and Rome with a brilliant performance of Manrico's stretta from the opera Il Trovatore by G. Verdi.

In September 1964, he resigned of his own accord and sang at the Tashkent Opera Theatre, as well as in other provincial theatres, the title roles in the operas Aida, Il Trovatore by G. Verdi, Tosca by G. Puccini and others.

=== Yuri Fedorovich Stepanov ===
(Russian: Юрий Федорович Степанов) Soloist from the 1940s, possibly a tenor soloist. So far the only source of him being a soloist is a picture of him performing There Is a good town in the north by T. Khrennikov (1942) with Pyotr Tverdokhlebov and Nikolai Ustinov

=== Alexei Nikolaevich Sakchinsky ===
(Russian: Алексей Николаевич Сакчинский) bass soloist from the late 30s who joined in 1929. He recorded Volzhskaya Burlatskaya during the 1937 tour of the ensemble.

=== M.T Ivanov ===
(Russian: М.Т Иванов) Baritone soloist. He recorded Volzhskaya Burlatskaya with the ensemble in 1949.

=== Igor Nikolaevich Kuleshov ===
(Russian: Игорь Nikolaevich Кулешов) Baritone soloist and choir member. He performed the Vasya Vasilyok duet with Nikolai Afanseyevich Abramov in 1941 with the Moscow Military District Ensemble.

=== V.S Petrov ===
(Russian: В.C Петров) bass soloist. He performed Kavaleriyskaya Budennovskaya with Georgy Babayev and Yuseph Laute in 1940. and Roared the storm (1939)

=== Ivan Petrovich Shuvalov ===
(Russian: Иван Петрович Шувалов) tenor soloist. He performed Far Eastern ditties (Dal'nevostochnyye chastushki) with Stepan A. Tibaev (1938)

=== Vladimir Petrovich Zakharov ===
(Russian: Владимир Петрович Захаров) (1903–1965) – soloist of the All-Union Radio. Taught vocals at the Gnessin Music College. Honored Artist of the RSFSR.

Baritone soloist. He performed March song of Stalin's aviation with Georgy Vinogradov and the vocal octet of the ensemble.

=== Sergei Nikolaevich Streltsov ===
(Russian: Сергей Николаевич Стрельцов) tenor soloist (1890–1953)

Streltsov Sergei Nikolaevich. Honored Artist of the RSFSR. He performed at the Bolshoi Theater with a short break from 1920 to 1946. Lyric and dramatic tenor.

He performed mainly in the Russian opera repertoire – the Prince (The Mermaid), Lykov, Herman, The Pretender, Boyan, Levko, Golitsyn; Vsevolod ( The Tale of the City of Kitezh ), Finn; Mikhail Tucha (The Maid of Pskov), Gvidon, Vladimir Igorevich; Andrei (Mazepa), Shuisky, Sinodal, Andrei Khovansky, Popovich, The Old Grandfather. In operas by Soviet composers – the Singer (Quiet Flows the Don), Ivashko (Stepan Razin), Zinovy Borisovich, Shchukar.

He was also a soloist with the Alexandrov Ensemble and performed There is a cliff on the Volga (1936) and "Ah, you night!" (1936)

=== Vyacheslav Nikolaevich Azovtsev ===
(Russian: Вячеслав Николаевич Азовцев) Baritone soloist (1937–1992)

Graduated from the Leningrad Conservatory under Professor V.M. Lukanin.

Worked as a leading soloist at the Syktyvkar Musical Theater, where he became Honored Artist of the Komi ASSR.

In 1971 he was invited to the Alexandrov Ensemble, where he worked as a soloist of the chorus and host of concert programs until the end of his life.

=== Ivan Dmitrievich Taranov ===
(Russian: Иван Дмитриевич Таранов) tenor soloist from the 1940s.

He mainly performed duets with Vladimir Glazov. He recorded All for Motherland (1942) and Falcons, Soar Like Eagles (1943),

=== Evgeny Alexandrovich Tolstov ===
(Russian: Евгений Александрович Толстов) (born 1910)

Baritone soloist. One of the oldest soloists of the choir starting from 1938 – 1981. Honored Artist of Russia recipient. He can be seen many times in the ensembles choir from the 60s/70s in concert footage. With the ensemble he recorded Song about Moscow with Oleg Razumovsky (1945) I'll saddle my steed (1938).

Honored Artist of the RSFSR (1972). He had a powerful voice with a beautiful timbre. He worked as a soloist in the Red Army Song Ensemble of the USSR from 1938. He participated in the sound recording of the films “Circus” and “At 6 o'clock in the evening after the war.” He was the first performer of I. Dunaevsky's song “My Native Land is Wide.” During the Great Patriotic War, he was an active participant in frontline concert brigades. E.A. Tolstov performed such songs as the Russian soldier's song “Soar, Falcons, Eagles” (with N. Taranov), “I Will Saddle My Horse” (A. Varlamov and A. Koltsov), “The Whole Country Sings with Us” (M. Blanter and V. Lebedev-Kumach), and others. He was awarded the “Participant of the Khasan Battles” badge, the Order of the Badge of Honor, and many medals. After finishing his solo career, he sang in a choir for many years. He retired and left the ensemble in February 1981.

=== Nikolay Mikhailovich Pashutin ===
(Russian: Николай Михайлович Пашутин) tenor soloist from 1938–1941. With the ensemble he recorded Toropka's Song (Opera «Askold’s grave», act 3) in 1940.

=== Boris Stepanovich Deinenka ===
(Russian: Борис Степанович Дейнека) (1902–1986) Bass soloist. He graduated from the Moscow Conservatory and then completed postgraduate studies there.

B. S. Deineka was a soloist of the All-Union Radio, a laureate of the All-Union Sobinov Vocalists Competition (the so-called Sobinov Prize).

From 1934 to 1936, he recorded more than 40 sound recordings of opera parts, arias, songs and romances on the radio, including the famous song by I. O. Dunaevsky to the verses of V. I. Lebedev-Kumach “My native country is wide” – B. Deineka was the first performer to record the song, and it was in his performance that it was heard every morning on the radio throughout the country.

He repeatedly performed solo with the Song and Dance Ensemble of the Moscow Military District and sang under the direction of the All-Union Radio Orchestra.

With the ensemble he recorded The Fight Song (Песня борьбы) in 1941.

=== Alexander Stepanovich Pirogov ===
(Russian: Алекса́ндр Степа́нович Пирого́в) (1899–1964). Bass soloist. And soloist of the Bolshoi Theatre from 1924 until 1954

Pirogov was born in Ryazan, one of five sons of a musical father. Four of the five brothers became singers, most notably Grigory, also a bass.

With the ensemble he recorded A Poem About Ukraine (1943)

=== Ivan Sergeevich Patorzhinskiy ===
(Russian: Иван Сергеевич Паторжинский) (1896–1960) Bass soloist and opera singer.

Ivan Patorzhinsky was born on 3 March 1896 in village Petro-Svistunovo, Aleksandrovsk uyezd, Yekaterinoslav Governorate, Russian Empire [now Vilniansk Raion, Zaporizhia Oblast, Ukraine]. He was an actor, known for Natalka Poltavka (1936), Zaporozhets za Dunayem (1953) and Soviet Ukraine (1947). He died on 22 February 1960 in Kiev, Ukrainian SSR, USSR [now Ukraine].

With the ensemble he recorded a few songs, such as Roared and Groaned the Dnieper River (1943) and Oh, in the meadow and also by the shore with Georgy Vinogradov (1943)

=== Georgii Mikhailovich Nelepp ===
(Russian: Георгий Михайлович Нэлепп) (20 April 1904 – 18 June 1957) tenor soloist and opera singer.

From 1930 to 1957, Nelepp performed dramatic tenor parts at the Kirov Theatre in St. Petersburg and the Bolshoi Theatre in Moscow. In Nelepp's entry in Great Soviet Encyclopedia, V. I. Zubarin writes, "One of the best Soviet opera singers, Nelepp was a highly skilled actor. He possessed a sonorous, soft voice capable of rich timbre. He was noted for the richness of his characterizations and for the austerity and nobility of his artistic form." In notes for a CD featuring Nelepp and three other Bolshoi tenors (Ivan Kozlovsky, Georgy Vinogradov, and Sergei Lemeshev), Charles Haynes calls Nelepp "the most exciting" of them, explaining that his "voice and artistry are entirely different from those of his three colleagues: the voice itself has a compelling 'ring' to it and there is a sense of urgency about his performances."

Nelepp's life trajectory from farmhand to celebrated opera singer was marked by two youthful choices—joining the Russian Revolution as a member of the Red Army and successfully auditioning for a place in the opera-singing course at the Leningrad Conservatory despite having no previous musical training.

With the ensemble he recorded Strong is Soviet Country with Oleg Nikolaevich Razumovsky (1947)

=== A.A. Lvov ===
(Russian: А.А Львов) tenor soloist. With the ensembles vocal octet he recorded Marianna with Nikolay Abramov (1957)

=== Yuri Afanseyevich Lysenko ===
(Russian: Юрий Афанасьевич Лысенко) (1933–2014) Lyric tenor soloist of the octet

Honored Artist of the RSFSR (1978).

He was born in Kharkov. He had a self-taught voice with a distinct timbre and a wide vocal range in the higher register.

In 1950 he entered the Moscow Music School at the P.I. Tchaikovsky State Conservatory in the class of Professor G.I. Tits.

In 1952 he was called up to the Soviet Army. He served his compulsory military service in the Alexandrov Ensemble, after which he remained in the group and faithfully served the army art for more than half a century. For many years he was a soloist of the famous octet of the ensemble, led the first tenor part of the choir and performed the so-called backing vocals, which are the most difficult in terms of tessitura.

For his years of work, he was awarded the medals "For Military Valor", "For Labor Valor", "Veteran of the Armed Forces", Medal "In Commemoration of the 850th Anniversary of Moscow", as well as medals of the German Democratic Republic, the Socialist Republic of Vietnam, the Mongolian People's Republic and Czechoslovakia. In 2003, he was awarded the Order of Honour.

Participant of numerous tours of the ensemble in 40 countries around the world.

In 2006 he finished working in the team. The name of Yu.A. Lysenko was included in the encyclopedia “The Best People of Russia (2006)”.

=== Boris A. Kazakov ===
(Russian: Борис А. Казаков) Bass Singer.

With the Alexandrov Ensemble he performed "Stop! Who goes there?" in a trio with Viktor Dmitriev and Alexander Sibirtsev (1960s)

=== Gennady Robertovich Ponomarev ===
(Russian: Геннадий Робертович Пономарёв) With the Alexandrov Ensemble he performed "Eternal Glory To Our Heroes" (Вечная Слава Героям) with Boris Shapenko (1969)

== Other soloists ==
Lev Leshchenko (born 1942): a soloist with the Ensemble from 1962. With the Alexandrov ensemble he performed Den Pobedy on Soviet TV (1976).

A. I. Mischenko (Russian: А.И. Мищенко) (from GABTa).

Tenor soloists from the mid 1930s: N. Makarov, V. Lyuktevich, P.P Tatarsky, A.K Arsenyuk

Yakov Semyonovich Pavlinsky (Tenor) Grigory Vasilievich Fominok G. Shapovalenko

== Ensemble announcers/reciters ==
- Alexey Stepanovich Gorsky (reciter, 1930s)
- Valery Petrovich Gorlanov (1950s–1966)
- Evgeny Nesterov (1960s–1990s)
- Vyacheslav Nikolaevich Azovtsev (1970s–?)
- Sergei Mikhailovich Mamayev

== Current soloists ==
- Valery Gavva, People's Artist of Russia
- Vadim Petrovich Ananyev – "Mr Kalinka", People's Artist of Russia
- Tatiana Deryabkina, Honoured Artist of Russia
- Maxim Maklakov, Honoured Artist of Russia
- Alexander Kruse
- Dmitry Besedin
- Roman Danilov
- Alexey Skachkov
- Roman Valutov
- Alexander Vershinin

== See also ==
- Alexandrov Ensemble
- Alexandrov Ensemble choir
- Alexandrov Ensemble discography
