= Skopinsky =

Skopinsky (masculine), Skopinskaya (feminine), or Skopinskoye (neuter) may refer to:

- Skopinsky District, a district of Ryazan Oblast
- Skopinskaya, a rural locality (a village) in Arkhangelsk Oblast, Russia

== See also ==
- Skopin, Russia
