= Vyacheslav Markin =

Soviet serial killer, mass murderer and rapist

- Born: Vyacheslav Vasilievich Markin; 1948; Leningrad, RSFSR
- Died: 1992 (age 43 or 44); Ryazan, Russia
- Cause of death: Suicide by hanging
- Other names: "The Skopinsky Maniac" "The Snuffbox Devil"
- Years active: 1991
- Conviction: Died before he could be sentenced
- Penalty: None

Details
- Victims: 6
- Country: Soviet Union
- State: Ryazan

Vyacheslav Vasilievich Markin (Russian: Вячесла́в Васи́льевич Ма́ркин; 1948–1992), known as The Skopinsky Maniac, was a Soviet serial killer, mass murderer, robber, rapist and arsonist who committed six brutal murders.

== Biography ==
Markin was born in Leningrad, spending his childhood in a communal apartment. He never met his father, was cold towards his mother, and did not have any friends among his peers.

Markin committed his first theft at school - he was running late for class and, passing by the empty teacher's room, he saw someone's open bag, and in it - a purse in which there was money. He took the money, left the school, hid it and then returned. The police were called in but the wallet was not recovered. A month later, he stole 120 rubles which he claimed to had found on the road and gave it to his mother. His mother did not question it, and soon bought a bike for her son and made a magnificent feast to celebrate.

After some time, he fell out with his mother and ran away from home; thus he began to wander around the Union. In Dushanbe, he survived by pickpocketing, for which he was caught several times and sent to a penal colony. While in prison he gained more experience in his criminal activities and successfully escaped from detention several times. On one occasion, after escaping from a colony in Chusovoy in the Perm Oblast, he climbed into an apartment, where he searched for money. He was caught by the mistress of the house, whom he raped, beat and tied up. Markin was eventually arrested in Kirov for theft and was charged with escaping custody and rape. He was convicted and sentenced to 14 years imprisonment on all charges.

In the colony, he quarrelled with the local "pahan" Valery 'Ryaby' Ryabchikov. The confrontation led to a fight, in which Ryabchikov beat Markin. Learning that his opponent was preparing for an escape, Markin informed the colony's authorities of this. As a result, Ryaby was thrown into the deadline for several years. Ryaby's people then brutally beat up Markin and threw him out into the cold, but was saved by a prisoner passing by and whom Markin would become friends with after their release from the colony.

=== Murders ===
After his release, Markin went to the town of Skopin in Ryazan Oblast, where his fellow convict friend lived. There he met a divorced woman, and they began a romantic relationship. He told to her that he had been convicted, but that it was due to a false denunciation. They got married, and Markin took his wife's last name. In the city, he had a reputation as a decent, working man. He would always tell his wife that he was going on business trips, when in fact he was robbing people's apartments, bringing money and bags full of items home. Soon his wife became pregnant, which led Markin to commit more and more robberies to keep treating her well. In late 1990, in Ryazan and in Moscow, he was caught at a crime scene by the apartment owners. He beat them and then tied them with special "sea" knots, which got even tighter when they tried to get free. Both victims survived.

In the spring of 1991 in Ryazan, Markin involuntarily crossed paths with the former cellmate Ryaby Ryabchikov, who was about to kill him. However, Markin, together with his friend, killed Ryabchikov with particular cruelty, enjoying the process. Then they took the body to the Skopinsky District, threw it near the railway embankment on Skopin-Briquette and unsuccessfully tried to burn it. Afterwards, Markin realized that it was not difficult to commit murder. During a robbery in Ryazan, he killed the apartment's landlady, who found him during the crime. The most terrible crime he committed was a triple murder in the village of Mokhovoye, where his mother-in-law lived. At night, Markin climbed into the house of a neighbour, who had a sister-in-law and a small grandson. He tied them up, raped the daughter-in-law, tortured the child to death, and then brutally killed the mother and grandmother, then set the house on fire. In the morning he arrived in Novomichurinsk, climbed into the first apartment he found, and killed the mistress who was present.

While investigating the mass murder in Mokhovoye, one of the operatives drew attention to the children's swing near the house of Markin's mother-in-law, which had been tied into a sea knot. The same knots had tied up the victims in Mokhovoye, Ryazan and Novomichurinsk, and the body of Ryabchikov in Skopin. A search was carried out in Markin's wife's apartment, where stolen items were found and seized. Markin was soon arrested at a hotel in Ryazan, and in his hotel room stolen items from the last murder in Novomichurinsk were found. His case was led by the famous Ryazan investigator Dmitry Plotkin. Markin soon confessed under the weight of the evidence, talking cold-bloodedly and without regret about the murders. In 1992, when the materials of the case had already been referred to the court, Markin hanged himself in his cell.

== In the media ==
The information in documentaries vary wildly, despite the participation of the same experts in them. In the film "The Last Knot" it is stated that Markin learned to tie knots in his childhood thanks to his neighbor, while in the film "Dman the snuffbox" it is said that he learned complex knots in the colony from a cellmate who had served in the Navy. In the movie "The Dead Knot" it is claimed that Markin died from lung cancer before sentencing.

- Documentary film "The Last Knot" from the series "Criminal Russia".
- Documentary film "The Dead Knot" from the series "Invisible Battle".
- Documentary film "Damn the snuffbox" from the series "The investigation was conducted...".

== See also ==
- List of Russian serial killers
