= Aleksandr Komin =

Aleksandr Komin may refer to:

- Aleksandr Komin (killer) (1953–1999), Russian slave-owner and serial killer
- Aleksandr Komin (cyclist) (born 1995), Russian cyclist
