= Viktor Mokhov =

Russian criminal (born 1950)

- Born: 22 June 1950 (age 76); Skopin, Ryazan Oblast, RSFSR, Soviet Union
- Other names: "The Maniac of Skopin" (Russian: Скопинский маньяк, romanized: Skopinsky manyak)
- Known for: imprisoning and raping several women
- Spouse: unknown woman (deceased)
- Children: 3 (1 deceased)
- Status: Released
- Convictions: kidnapping, rape
- Penalty: 17 years

Viktor Vasilyevich Mokhov (Russian: Ви́ктор Васи́льевич Мо́хов; born 22 June 1950 in Skopin, Ryazan Oblast) is a Russian criminal who in 2000 kidnapped two girls, then 14 and 17 years old, kept them in a basement and raped them for almost four years.

== Biography ==
Mokhov lived in the Russian city of Skopin about 90 km from Ryazan. He was employed as a metalworker at the Skopin automobile assembly plant. He is described as having been a good worker, always ready to help. His foreman often held him up as an exemplary worker. Towards the end of the 1970s he was married, but divorced after only three months. At the time of the kidnapping he was living with his mother, and had no children.

At his house Mokhov built a garage with a bunker. The site ryazan.ru describes the structure thus:

The entrance to the bunker was carefully hidden from curious snoopers - it couldn't be accessed through the garage door; you had to go around to the side and using a screwdriver pry back a metal sheet held down by magnets. Then at ground level there was a concrete landing with a hatch. A stairway down a narrow passage led to the next landing and a concrete wall with two side hatches. One of these, made of iron with a padlock and two latches, served as the entrance to the sex chamber.

Mokhov's first known abduction occurred in December 1999, when a sixteen-year-old girl and her boyfriend visited him. He gave them alcohol, and then began to make advances towards the girl. She rejected his advances and left. He then followed her out into the street, hit her in the head, and dragged her back to his bunker. Over the course of two weeks he kept her in the bunker and raped her, until she managed to escape. However, she did not report the incident.

On September 30, 2000, fourteen-year-old schoolgirl Ekaterina Martynova and Elena Samokhina, a seventeen-year-old student at a Ryazan professional-technical institute, were returning from a disco in Ryazan. Mokhov offered to give them a ride. With him was his friend (and accomplice), 25-year-old Elena Badukina, who introduced herself as a young man named Lyosha (Badukina had short hair and looked somewhat like a man). Offering them drinks, into which he had mixed a sedative, Mokhov brought the girls back to his place and, possibly with the help of Badukina, dragged one of them into the garage and the other one into the bunker. There he kept the girls for 44 months, raping them. When the girls were uncooperative, he would starve them, keep them in the dark, beat them with a rubber hose, or spray tear gas in the room. When the girls would comply and have sex with him, he would treat them better. In particular, he bought them a television set, tape recorder, paints, and some books.

On November 6, 2001, and again on June 6, 2003, Samokhina gave birth. In both cases Martynova had to deliver the babies. Mokhov took the children (both male) away from Samokhina (the first two months after birth; the second four months after birth) and left them at the entrances of multi-story apartment buildings. Both children are now adopted.

Beginning in 2003, Mokhov started taking the girls out for walks, one at a time. Once he ordered Martynova to help him seduce a female student (a tenant to whom he rented out a room), to whom he presented Martynova as a relative. Martynova was able to leave at the girl's place a note with their names, home addresses, and the location of the bunker. The note read "Victor's not my uncle. He keeps us in the basement from September 2000 onwards. He can kill us and you. Take this note to the police." The girl gave the note to the police, and the police after some time located the missing girls and arrested Mokhov. Later Badukina was also arrested.

The girls spent a total of three years and eight months in captivity. At the time of their liberation, Samokhina was eight months pregnant. The child would later be stillborn.

=== Prosecution ===
Mokhov was sentenced by the Skopin municipal court to 17 years imprisonment in a penal colony according to Sect. 2 Art. 126 of the Criminal Code of the Russian Federation ("Kidnapping of two or more persons"), Sect. 2 Art. 131 ("Rape of a minor") and Sect. 2 Art. 132 ("Sexual violence against a minor"). His accomplice Elena Badukina got five and a half years. Mokhov appealed to the Ryazan regional court, but the regional court let the sentence stand.

The mother of the convict, Alisa Mokhova (1927–2014), denied that she had known anything about what happened. No charges have been filed against her.

=== After release ===
Mokhov was released from prison on March 3, 2021 after serving his entire 17 year sentence.

On 22 March 2021, a video of Ksenia Sobchak's hour-long interview with Mokhov appeared on YouTube. The publication caused a largely negative public reaction. Sobchak was accused of vulgarity, inappropriate speculation on the details of sexual violence and advertising the criminal. On June 16, the Ryazan regional court banned the "Skopin maniac" from communicating with journalists and visiting bars, cafes and restaurants where alcohol is sold.

At the end of July 2021, during the legislative elections campaign, a video appeared on social networks in which Mokhov, wearing clothes with the Communist Party logo, declares his support for Gennady Zyuganov. The Ryazan branch of the Communist Party called the recording a provocation. Mokhov was sentenced to 10 days of administrative arrest for violation of restrictions.

In August 2022, Mokhov was arrested for helping his friend Yevgeny Polishchuk hide the body of a man Polishchuk murdered inside of Mokhov's house. However he was released again in February 2023.

== See also ==
- List of long-term false imprisonment cases
- Vyacheslav Markin, Soviet serial killer also nicknamed the Maniac of Skopin
