= Nightingales (song) =

1944 song by Vasily Solovyov-Sedoi

Song
- Language: russian
- Genre: song
- Songwriter: Aleksey Fatyanov
- Producer: Vasily Solovyov-Sedoi

"Nightingales" (Russian: Соловьи, romanized: Solovʹi) is a popular song by composer Vasily Solovyov-Sedoi to the verses of Aleksey Fatyanov, written in 1944 (the first version of the poem is dated 1942). Initially, the song was known under the name “Spring has come to us at the front”, and the name “Nightingales, nightingales, do not disturb the soldiers” is also found. The first performers of the song were Georgy Vinogradov and Vladimir Bunchikov, some sources mention Mikhail Mikhailov. Solovyov-Sedoi also included the song "Nightingales" in his operetta "True Friend", which he completed in 1945.
