= Aleksandr Komin (killer) =

Russian serial killer and abductor

- Born: Aleksandr Nikolayevich Komin; 15 July 1953; Vyatskiye Polyany, Russian SFSR, Soviet Union
- Died: 15 June 1999 (aged 45); Kirov SIZO, Kirov, Russia
- Cause of death: Suicide
- Other name: "The Slaveholder"
- Conviction: Murder
- Penalty: Life imprisonment

Details
- Victims: 4
- Span of crimes: 1995–1997
- Country: Russia
- State: Kirov
- Date apprehended: 21 July 1997

Aleksandr Nikolayevich Komin (Russian: Алекса́ндр Никола́евич Ко́мин; 15 July 1953 – 15 June 1999), known as The Slaveholder (Russian: Рабовладелец, Rabovladyelyets), was a Russian serial killer and kidnapper. At various times from 1995 to 1997, he kept six people as prisoners in a 9-metre-deep bunker under his garage. Four of his prisoners were eventually murdered.

Komin was featured in several documentaries, including "Cooperative Prisoner" (1998) from the series Criminal Russia, Bunker. The modern version (2015) from the series "The investigation was conducted..." and a documentary film which appeared on Japanese television from the series Maniacs of the 20th Century.

== Life before the construction of the bunker ==
Komin was born on 15 July 1953, in Vyatskiye Polyany, where he subsequently committed all of his crimes. Having graduated from an eighth-grade school, Komin was sentenced to three years imprisonment for hooliganism at the age of 18. While serving his sentence in a penal colony, Komin worked at the colony's garment factory. The work of a tailor pleased him so much that, after his release, he graduated from college in this speciality. However, it was hard for Komin to fulfil his ambitions in a small town, so he worked as a watchman, an electrician and a handyman as well.

As Komin later explained, while serving his sentence, he met a prisoner who was convicted of holding several homeless people in his basement, forcing them to work for him. He enjoyed having unlimited power over others, so Komin wanted to experience the same thing.

== Creation of the bunker ==
To start, Komin needed a reliable partner. Soon, while working the night shift, he suggested the idea to his colleague, Alexander Mikheev, who agreed. Initially, Komin only planned to organize a greenhouse with electric heating in the bunker, where vegetables would be grown. Subsequently, Komin and Mikheev planned to sell them in a cafe. According to their plan, they would not work there, but forced labourers would.

Komin no longer had a car and never sold his garage. Soon, he came up with a new idea – to create a sewing workshop. After almost four years under the garage, the companions dug an underground bunker, where they arranged several rooms, wired electricity, added ventilation, and made a winch that performed the role of an elevator. By early 1995, their underground prison was ready.

== The first victims ==
Soon, the search for future slaves began, with the ideal option being a young, lone dressmaker. Komin and Mikheev walked around the city for a while, looking for potential workers in the market and at the station, but without success. On 13 January 1995, near a school on Gagarin Street, Komin met a woman named Vera Talpayeva, whom he offered to celebrate the Old New Year in good company. Komin brought her to the garage. There, he gave her a drink of vodka laced with clonidine.

Talpayeva could not sew and did not want to learn. She, however, pointed Komin to the tailor Tatiana Melnikova, who would become the next prisoner. She did not remember Melnikova's address exactly and only recalled the street – Parokhodnaya. While searching, Komin met a fellow former convict named Nikolai Malykh. Coincidentally, he turned out to be a cohabitant of Melnikova. Suggesting that they both celebrate the meeting, he gave Malykh vodka laced with clonidine. However, Komin realised that Malykh, knowing the laws of the criminal world, would never have started working for him. Komin and Mikheev then stripped him, took him out of the garage, and left Malykhin in the −7 °C (19 °F) cold. His body was discovered a week later.

== Work in the underground bunker and new victims ==
Melnikova began sewing dressing gowns and shorts for Komin, which he successfully sold in markets and enterprises. In parallel, the bunker construction continued, where Talpayeva was an auxiliary worker. However, there was no immediate clear-cut use for the bunker, and so Komin decided to procure himself a prisoner for it. On 21 March 1995, at a shop in Uritsky Street, Komin and Mikheev met a strong but alcoholic 37-year-old Yevgeny Shishov. He agreed to a free drink and soon found himself in the bunker. Komin figured out that Shishov was an electrician. Komin could not allow any of his prisoners to figure out the electrical junctions of the bunker and cut off the ladder from the current. For the execution of Shishov, he made an electric chair of his design: Komin wrapped Shishov's legs and hands with bare wires, plugged them into an outlet, and made Talpayeva and Melnikova push two switches simultaneously. As Mikheev later said: "He was like this: 'Aaah!' [...] and everything [went ...] you know, quickly [...]". Shishov's body was lifted on a hoist to the top, taken to the forest, and then buried.

Work in the bunker continued, but Melnikova alone could not satisfy Komin's increased appetite, and he then released Talpayeva to help find him a new prisoner — Komin felt that, being an accomplice to the murder of Shishov, Talpayeva would not betray him.

On 16 July 1995, Talpayeva brought another future prisoner — Tatiana Kozikova — to the garage. Kozikova was to be held in court for petty theft in five days. Melnikova taught Kozikova the basics of tailoring, and soon, the garment factory had a full working force.

Komin was merciless – his prisoners had to work 16 hours a day, and he had incredible standards: for example, they had to sew 32 dressing gowns per day. Then, Melnikova and Kozikova decided to escape. However, implementing the plan was difficult because it was open and the staircase was cut off from the current only when Komin was inside. Finding an opportunity, they locked Komin in one of the rooms, jamming the door with a frying pan. However, they did not escape – Komin broke out and caught them. He offered them a choice – either he cut their mouths to the ears or would stamp "РАБ" (rab, "slave") on their faces. They chose the latter, and Komin did it. From now on, the regime was toughened – now, when Komin entered the garage, he signalled using a light bulb, and the prisoners had to put on their collars and shackles and put the keys on a table.

Meanwhile, Talpayeva had to look for new prisoners, but she disappeared. Deciding that she had left town, Komin himself continued the search. While visiting the station, his attention was drawn to a young woman – 27-year-old Tatyana Nazimova, who had been homeless for several years, travelling around different stations of the Gorky Railway. He offered her food and lodging, and soon, another prisoner appeared in the bunker. However, Komin soon realised that this time he was mistaken: Nazimova was seriously ill mentally and physically, so he and Mikheev only had use for her as a lover. A year later, however, Komin became bored with his companion, and after leaving her without food for several days, he eventually killed her with brake fluid.

Komin laid Nazimova's corpse on a sledge and rode to the city morgue, wishing to leave it at the entrance. Two hundred metres from the garage, he was frightened by an accidental passer-by and threw the corpse, fleeing.

Komin tried to realize one more of his dreams – growing cucumbers in a greenhouse with electric heating. But as soon as the prisoners gathered their first harvest, a neighbour complained to Komin that he suddenly felt the heat from the garage cellar, and Komin then began to grow potatoes. However, eventually, all of the agricultural experiments were stopped.

== Komin's ordinary life ==
During this time, Komin appeared to live quite an ordinary life. He lived in an apartment on Shkolnaya Street, along with his concubine, but at the same time, he visited his garage daily. Neither Komin's partner nor his neighbours suspected that any unnatural activities were happening in the garage, which had no car for a long time. Also, Komin was registered as unemployed in the public employment service and regularly received unemployment benefits.

Komin was engaged in public activities and was already at the zenith of entrepreneurial success. In addition to the usual products of the garment factory, the prisoners began to sew phelonions for local priests and even wove icons. Komin also forced them to weave a huge coat of arms of Russia, which he tried to sell to the Vyatskiye Polyana administration and even the local police but was refused.

== The factory's final year ==
In January 1997, Komin unexpectedly met the missing Vera Talpayeva in the city. He offered her new conditions for cooperation: now she had to look for markets for the garment factory's products in exchange for an appropriate reward and bring in new prisoners. A few days later, Talpayeva brought into the garage 22-year-old Irina Ganyushkina, whom Komin later tried to artificially fertilize (with the help of a syringe) to produce additional slaves for himself. He killed Talpayeva in the garage using the same brake fluid, but unlike Nazimova, he tormented her for several hours before that.

== Arrest, trial and sentence ==
Komin fell in love with Ganyushkina and wanted to formalize an official marriage with her. Kozikova and Melnikova, realizing that this was their chance to escape, persuaded Ganyushkina to agree. Komin threatened to deal with the 22-year-old woman if she tried to escape. Ganyushkina agreed, but when Komin left her for a few minutes in his apartment unattended, she ran to the police on 21 July 1997. Initially, the employees did not believe her, but when they named those in the bunker, they immediately demanded she indicate the bunker's location. Komin was arrested near his garage. He tried to stop the electricity in the ladder to try to escape, but Ganyushkina had reported this in advance. After Melnikova and Kozikova were discovered in the bunker, they were hospitalized, with both wearing a bandages around their eyes so that they would not be blinded by the sunlight, which they had not seen in two years.

Mikheev was arrested soon after Komin and began to testify, confessing to four murders, the illegal deprivation of liberty of three more people, the use of enslaved labour, and criminal entrepreneurship.

In 1999, the Kirov Regional Court sentenced Alexander Komin to life imprisonment and Alexander Mikheev to 20 years imprisonment. After the sentencing, Komin killed himself in his cell by cutting open his femoral artery.

== See also ==
- Viktor Mokhov
- Josef Fritzl case
- Kidnapping of Jaycee Dugard
- Ariel Castro kidnappings
- List of Russian serial killers
