= Vladimir Bunchikov =

Vladimir Bunchikov

Vladimir Bunchikov (Russian: Владимир Бунчиков; 21 November 1902 in Yekaterinoslav – 17 March 1995 in Moscow) was a Soviet baritone and Honoured Artist of Russia (1944). In Simferopol he was a scenery operator at the Drama Theatre. After graduating from the Dnepropetrovsk Music College, he studied in Leningrad. From 1929 he was a soloist at the Opera in Dnepropetrovsk, and from 1931 at the Nemirovicha-Danchenko Musical Theatre in Moscow.

From 1934, he recorded songs. With V. Kandelaki he sang jazz, and he sang with the popular orchestra directed by B. Knushevitsky, and with the Alexandrov Ensemble directed by Boris Alexandrov on All-Union Radio. His main repertoire was the songs of Soviet composers. From 1942 to 1967 he was a soloist of the All-Union Radio. For 25 years he performed fine duets with the lyric tenor Vladimir Nechaev (1908–1969) whom he had met during World War II.

With the Ensemble of the All-Union Radio Committee under Boris Alexandrov he recorded "Evening in the Roadstead"/"Night on the Road" duet with P. Mikhailov (recorded 1942) . This is a baritone-tenor duet, and the choir includes women sopranos. He also recorded "Nightingales" in the 1940s as a baritone-tenor duet with Georgi Pavlovich Vinogradov, "It's a Long Time Since We Were Home" duet with V. Nechaev.
