= Vladimir Nechaev =

Soviet singer (1908–1969)

Vladimir Alexandrovich Nechaev (Russian: Влади́мир Алекса́ндрович Неча́ев; 28 July 1908 — 11 April 1969) was a Soviet singer, a lyric tenor. A holder of the title of Meritorious Artist of the RSFSR since 1959. A soloist of the USSR All-State Radio since 1942. The original performer of a number of songs by such composers as Boris Mokrousov, Vasily Solovyov-Sedoi, Matvey Blanter. In 1944 he formed a duet with Vladimir Bunchikov, a highly acclaimed collaboration that continued for 25 years, until Nechaev's death in 1969.
