= Anatoly Novikov =

Russian composer

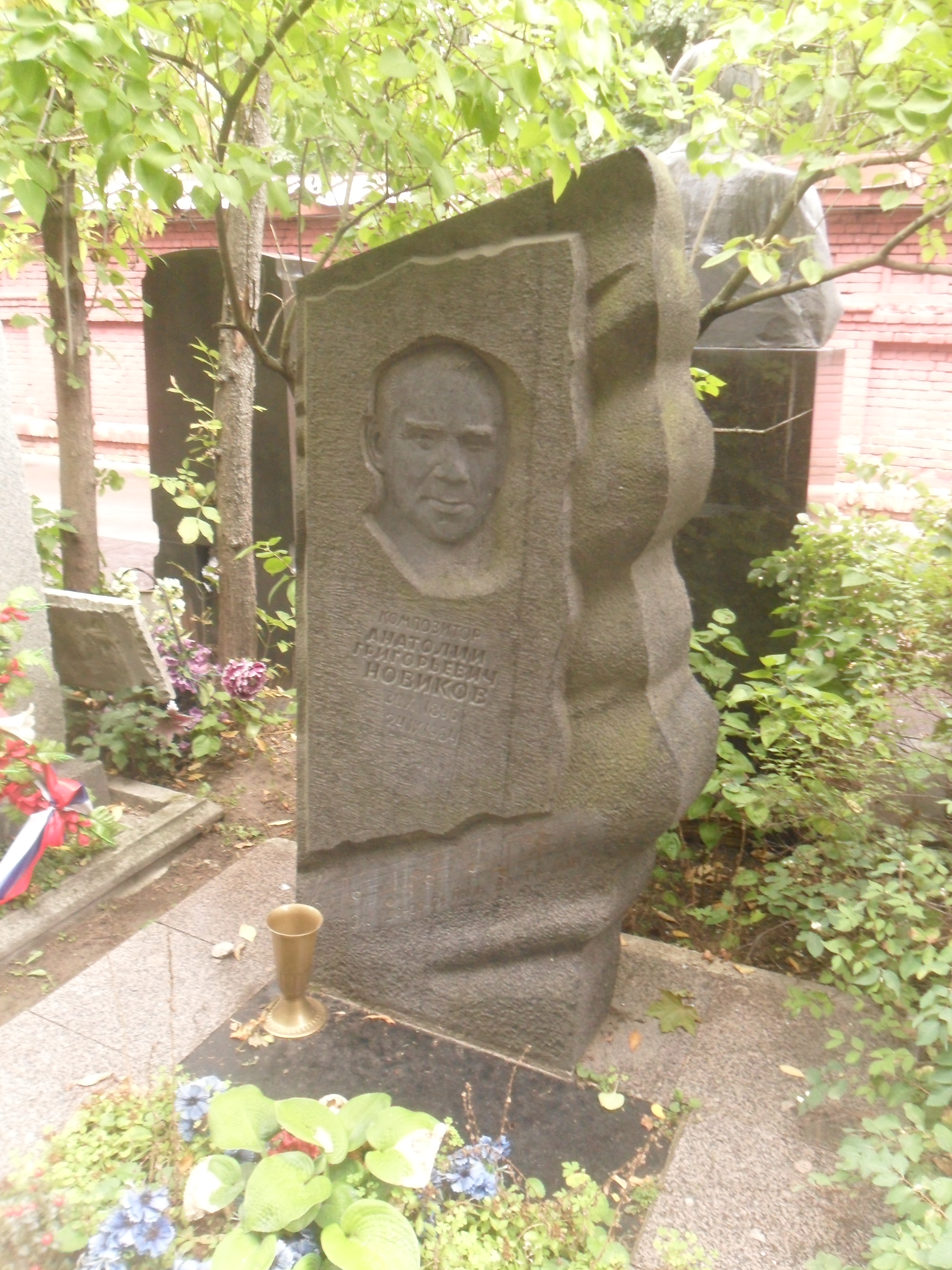
Anatoly Novikov's grave at Novodevichy Cemetery, Moscow

Anatoly Grigoryevich Novikov (Russian: Анато́лий Григо́рьевич Но́виков; 30 October [O.S. 18 October] 1896, Skopin – 24 September 1984, Moscow) was a Soviet and Russian composer, choral conductor, and pedagogue.

== Background ==
Novikov was awarded two Stalin Prizes, in 1946 and 1948. In 1970 he was bestowed the title of People's Artist of the USSR and in 1976 he was awarded the title of Hero of Socialist Labour and the Order of Lenin. He composed the widely popular songs "Vasya-vasilyok" (1941), "Smuglyanka" (1943), "Rossiya" (1946), "Roads" (1946), and "The Hymn of Democratic Youth of the World" (1947).

== Awards and honors ==
- Stalin Prize, 2nd class (1946)
- Honored Art Worker of the RFSFR (1947)
- Stalin Prize, 2nd class (1948)
- Order of the Red Banner of Labour (1956)
- People's Artist of the RSFSR (1961)
- Order of Lenin (1966)
- People's Artist of the USSR (1970)
- Order of the October Revolution (1971)
- Order of Lenin (1976)
- Hero of Socialist Labour (1976)
