= Gerasimovka =

Gerasimovka (Russian: Гера́симовка) is the name of several rural localities in Russia:

- Gerasimovka, Sverdlovsk Oblast, a village in Sverdlovsk Oblast
- Gerasimovka, Ulyanovsk Oblast, a village in Ulyanovsk Oblast
- Gerasimovka, name of several other rural localities
