= Smuglyanka =

Soviet folk song

"Smuglyanka", "Smuglianka", or "Smugljanka" (Russian: Смуглянка "the dark girl", from смуглый "dark, swarthy"; also Смуглянка-Молдаванка, romanized: Smugljanka-Moldavanka "the dark Moldovan girl" (swarthy)) is a Russian song written in 1940 by Yakov Shvedov (lyrics) and Anatoliy Grigorevich Novikov (music). It was commissioned by the Kiev Military District's political office for the District Song and Dance Ensemble, as part of a suite in honour of Grigory Kotovsky, leader of two Moldovan rebellions in Bessarabia Governorate against the Russian Empire in 1905 and 1915. It is written in the style of a Moldovan folk song.

The song was intended to glorify the female partisans of the Russian Civil War. The lyrics tell how the singer met a pretty dark-skinned girl gathering grapes and tried to seduce her, but how the girl turns out to be a partisan and convinces him to join the partisans as well.

The song was not performed as part of the suite. In 1940, songs composed for the troops on the front were supposed to be about revenge and victory. By 1942, fashions had changed, and songs with more romantic or lyrical themes were accepted by the military, so Novikov decided to re-release a revised version of the song, which was never performed before the war. Its piano score was lost, and the author only had drafts. When the artistic director of the Red Banner Ensemble A. V. Alexandrov called him and asked him to show songs for his group's new program, Novikov showed "Smuglyanka". Alexandrov liked it, and he immediately began to learn it with the choir and soloists Its first performance came in the Tchaikovsky Concert Hall in Moscow, by the Alexandrov Ensemble, with soloist Nikolaiy Ustinov. It was an immediate success, and had to be repeated three times as the audience requested encores. Because the song became famous outside of its original context of the Kotovsky Suite, it was taken as a reference to the then-contemporary Soviet partisans of the Great Patriotic War (WWII).

Smuglyanka was used in the 1973 Soviet film Only "Old Men" Are Going to Battle (В бой идут одни "старики"), the most popular Soviet film about the Great Patriotic War according to Afisha Daily. In the film, a young fighter pilot introduces the song to his squadron and so gets nicknamed "the dark girl". The film was first shown on 27 December 1973. Hero of the Soviet Union Alexander Pokryshkin was reportedly wiping his eyes as the lights came back on. The film became a blockbuster, seen by 54 million viewers within five months, and Smuglyanka as a consequence became known throughout the Soviet Union, entering the standard repertoire of Russian folk songs. Shvedov had not been told about the use of his song in the film and learned about it from movie-going friends.

One of the most famous Soviet patriotic songs, Smuglyanka has been sung in 21 languages: Russian, Yakut, Ukrainian, Kazakh, Hungarian, Estonian, Latvian, Polish, Czech, Slovak, Serbo-Croatian, Swedish, German, French, English, Hindi, Punjabi, Chinese, Japanese, Korean, and Hebrew.

== Lyrics ==
Как-то летом, на рассвете,
Заглянул в соседний сад.
Там смуглянка-молдаванка
Собирает виноград.
Я краснею, я бледнею,
Захотелось вдруг сказать:
— Станем над рекою
Зорьки летние встречать!

Припев × 2:
Раскудрявый клён зелёный – лист резной.
Я влюблённый и смущённый пред тобой.
Клён зелёный, да клён кудрявый,
Да раскудрявый, резной!

А смуглянка-молдаванка
Отвечала парню в лад:
— Партизанский, молдаванский
Собираем мы отряд.
Нынче рано партизаны
Дом покинули родной.
Ждёт тебя дорога
К партизанам в лес густой.

Припев × 2:
Раскудрявый клён зелёный – лист резной.
Здесь у клёна мы расстанемся с тобой.
Клён зелёный, да клён кудрявый,
Да раскудрявый, резной!

И смуглянка-молдаванка
По тропинке в лес ушла.
В том обиду я увидел,
Что с собой не позвала.
О смуглянке-молдаванке
Часто думал по ночам ...
Вдруг свою смуглянку
Я в отряде повстречал!

Припев × 3:
Раскудрявый клён зелёный – лист резной.
Здравствуй, парень, мой хороший, мой родной!
Клён зелёный, да клён кудрявый,
Да раскудрявый, резной!

Kak-to letom, na rassvete,
Zagljanul v sosednij sad.
Tam smugljanka-moldavanka
Sobirajet vinograd.
Ja krasneju, ja bledneju,
Zahotelos' vdrug skazat':
— Stanem nad rekoju
Zor'ki letnije vstrečat'!

Pripev × 2:
Raskudrjavyj kljon zeljonyj – list reznoj.
Ja vljubljonnyj i smuščjonnyj pred toboj.
Kljon zeljonyj, da kljon kudrjavyj,
Da raskudrjavyj, reznoj!

A smugljanka-moldavanka
Otvečala parnju v lad:
— Partizanskij, moldavanskij
Sobirajem my otrjad.
Nynče rano partizany
Dom pokinuli rodnoj.
Ždjot tebja doroga
K partizanam v les gustoj.

Pripev × 2:
Raskudrjavyj kljon zeljonyj – list reznoj.
Zdes' u kljona my rasstanemsja s toboj.
Kljon zeljonyj, da kljon kudrjavyj,
Da raskudrjavyj, reznoj!

I smugljanka-moldavanka
Po tropinke v les ušla.
V tom obidu ja uvidel,
Čto s soboj ne pozvala.
O smugljanke-moldavanke
Často dumal po nočam ...
Vdrug svoju smugljanku
Ja v otrjade povstrečal!

Pripev × 3:
Raskudrjavyj kljon zeljonyj – list reznoj.
Zdravstvuj, paren', moj horošij, moj rodnoj!
Kljon zeljonyj, da kljon kudrjavyj,
Da raskudrjavyj, reznoj!

Once a summer, at dawn,
I glanced at the next garden.
There a swarthy woman, a Moldovan
was picking grapes.
I blushed, I grew pale,
I suddenly wanted to say
"Let's go greet summer dawns
over the river!"

Chorus × 2:
The maple all curly and green, its leaves as if carved!
I'm in love and abashed in front of you.
The maple is green and curly,
and curly and carved!

But the swarthy woman, the Moldovan
Said in mood:
"We Moldovan partisans
are forming a squad.
Early the partisans
left their homes.
The road awaits you,
to join them in the dense forest."

Chorus × 2:
The maple all curly and green, its leaves as if carved!
Here, under the maple, we will part.
The maple is green and curly,
and all curly and carved!

Then the swarthy, the Moldovan
took the path into the forest.
I was hurt that she left me
without inviting accompany
About the swarthy, the Moldovan
I thought often in the nights ...
Then in the forest, of a sudden,
I found my swarthy one in the ranks!

Chorus × 3:
The maple is curly and green, its leaves as if carved!
Hello, my dear, my darling!
The maple is green and curly,
all curly and carved!

== Charts ==
Chart performance for "Smuglyanka" (Alexandrov Ensemble version)
Chart (2025)	Peak position
Russia Streaming (TopHit)	71
