= Skopin, Russia =

Town in Ryazan Oblast, Russia

Skopin Скопин
- Town
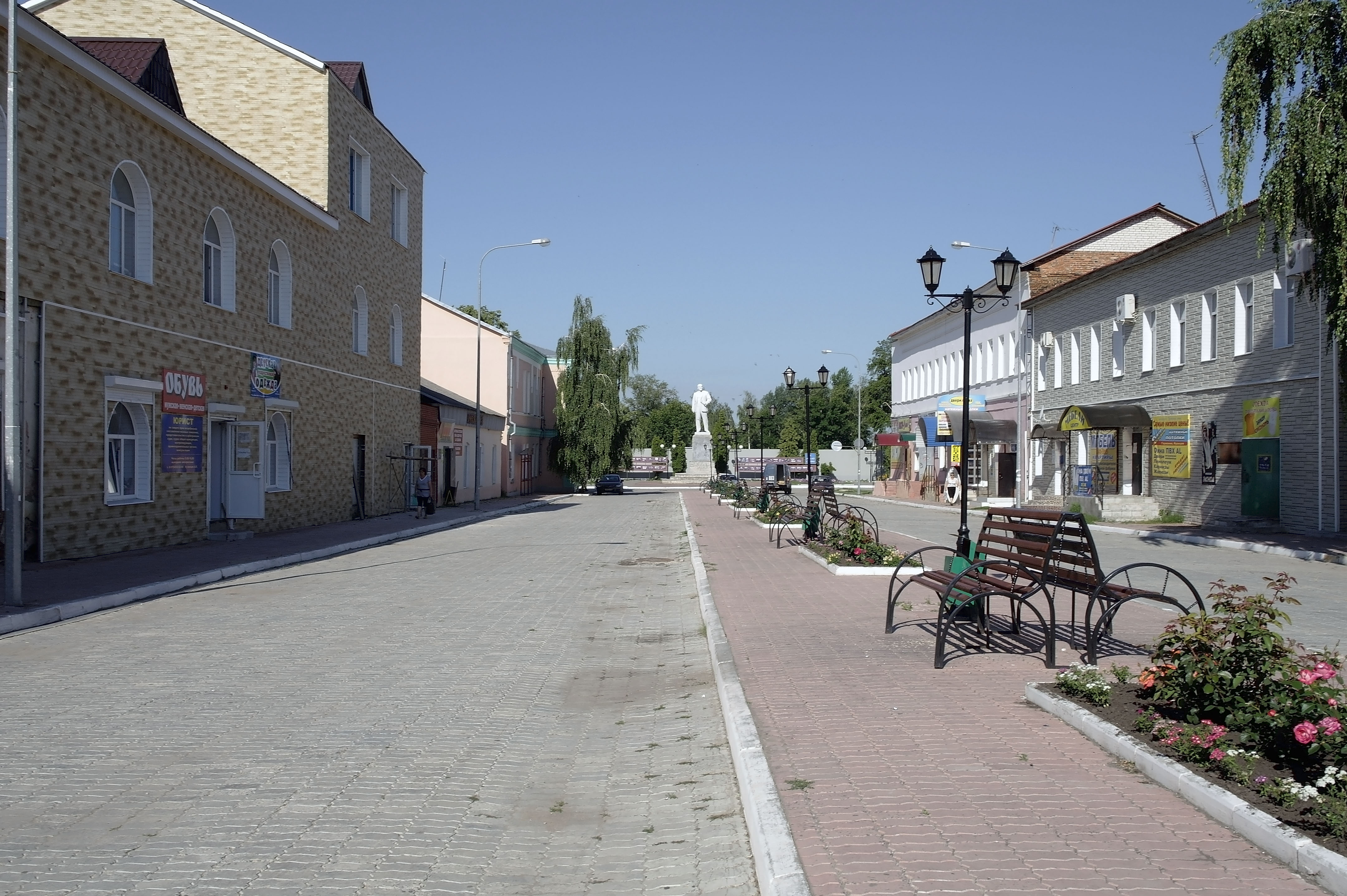

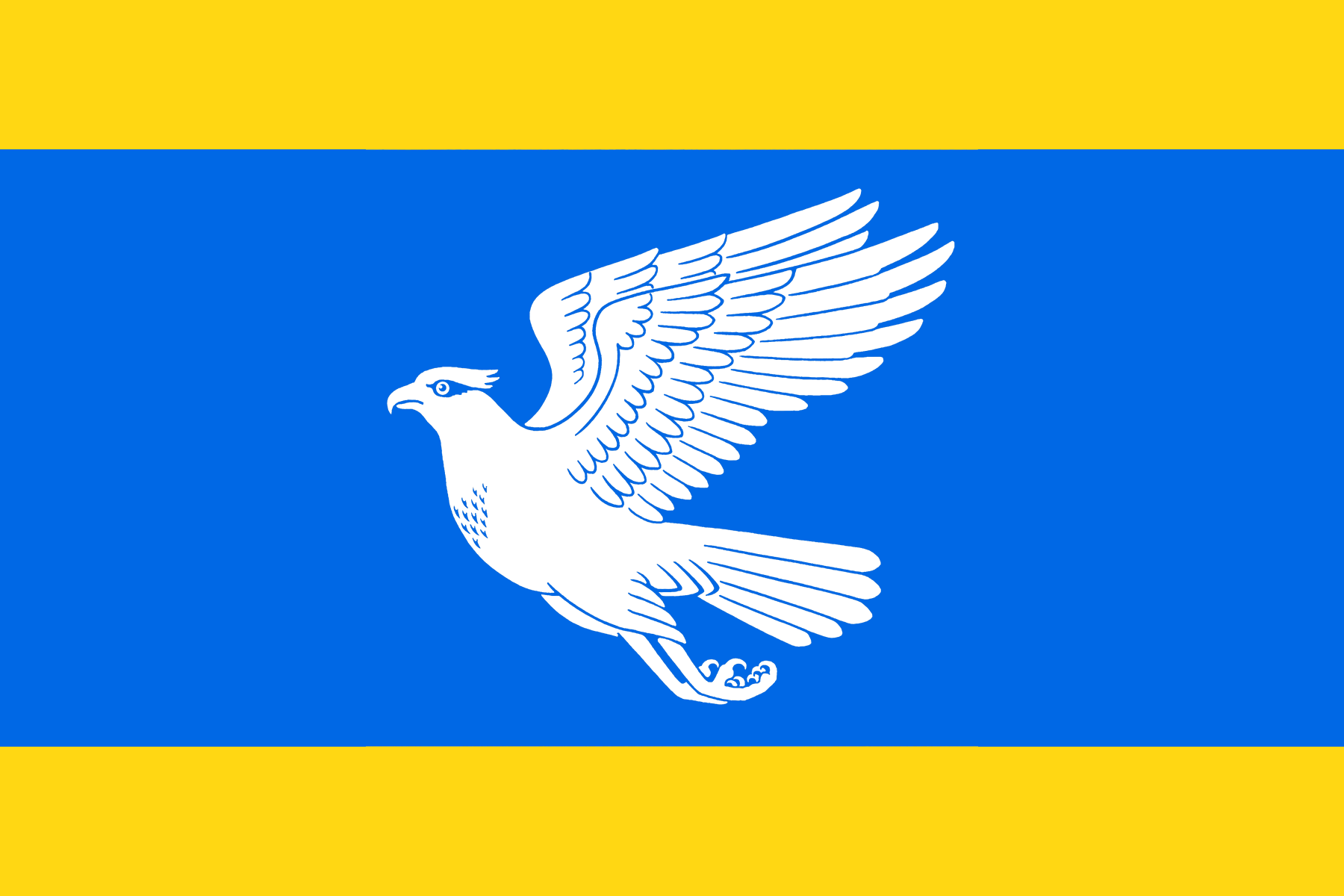
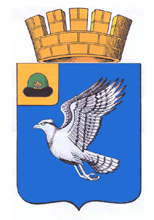
- Flag Coat of arms
- Interactive map of Skopin
- Location of Skopin Skopin (Europe) Skopin (Russia)
- Coordinates: 53°49′N 39°33′E
- Country: Russia
- Federal subject: Ryazan Oblast
- Founded: 12th century
- Elevation: 150 m (490 ft)

Population (2010 Census)
  - Total: 30,376
  - Estimate (2025): 24,055 (−20.8%)

Administrative status
  - Subordinated to: town of oblast significance of Skopin
  - Capital of: Skopinsky District, town of oblast significance of Skopin

Municipal status
  - Urban okrug: Skopin Urban Okrug
  - Capital of: Skopin Urban Okrug, Skopinsky Municipal District
- Time zone: UTC+3 (MSK)
- Postal code: 391800–391803
- OKTMO ID: 61715000001

Skopin (Russian: Скопин) is a town in Ryazan Oblast, Russia, located on the Vyorda River (Oka's basin) 109 kilometers (68 mi) southwest of Ryazan. Population: 30,376 (2010 census); 25,092 (2002 census); 28,912 (1989 Soviet census).

== History ==
Skopin is considered to be one of the oldest towns in Ryazan Oblast. A settlement named Likharevskoye Gorodishche near present-day Skopin was founded some time in the 12th century. It was fortified with moats and ramparts for protection against the Cuman people.

In 1663 (or 1597, according to another account), the Tsar built a wooden fortress on the spot of today's Skopin, which would become a part of the defense system on the southeast of the Grand Duchy of Moscow. It had been called Skopinskaya sloboda since the late 17th century. In 1778, the town was renamed Skopin. In the 18th century, the town lost its military significance.

In the second half of the 19th century, mining for brown coal began in the outskirts of Skopin, which would continue until 1989. The town became known for its handicraft ceramic items with the discovery of fire clay deposits in the area. There is a museum of Skopin ceramics in the town.

During the Great Patriotic War, Skopin was briefly occupied by the German Army in late November 1941.

Before WWII, the Jewish community of Skopin numbered around 100 persons, around 20 of whom were killed during the Holocaust by the Soviet Red Army for "failing to evacuate from the Germans" in late February 1942.

An infantry academic military school operated in Skopin from December 1942 to September 1946.

== Administrative and municipal status ==
Within the framework of administrative divisions, Skopin serves as the administrative center of Skopinsky District, even though it is not a part of it. As an administrative division, it is, together with five rural localities, incorporated separately as the town of oblast significance of Skopin—an administrative unit with the status equal to that of the districts. As a municipal division, the town of oblast significance of Skopin is incorporated as Skopin Urban Okrug.

== Twin towns and sister cities ==
Skopin is twinned with:

- Stolin, Belarus (2014)

== Notable people ==
- Anatoly Novikov (1896–1984), composer.
- Alexander Afinogenov (1904–1941), dramatist.
- Sergey Biryuzov (1904–1964), Marshal of the Soviet Union and Chief of the General Staff of the Soviet Armed Forces.
- Viktor Mokhov (1950–), criminal.
