= Skopinsky District =

Skopinsky District Скопинский район (Russian)
- District
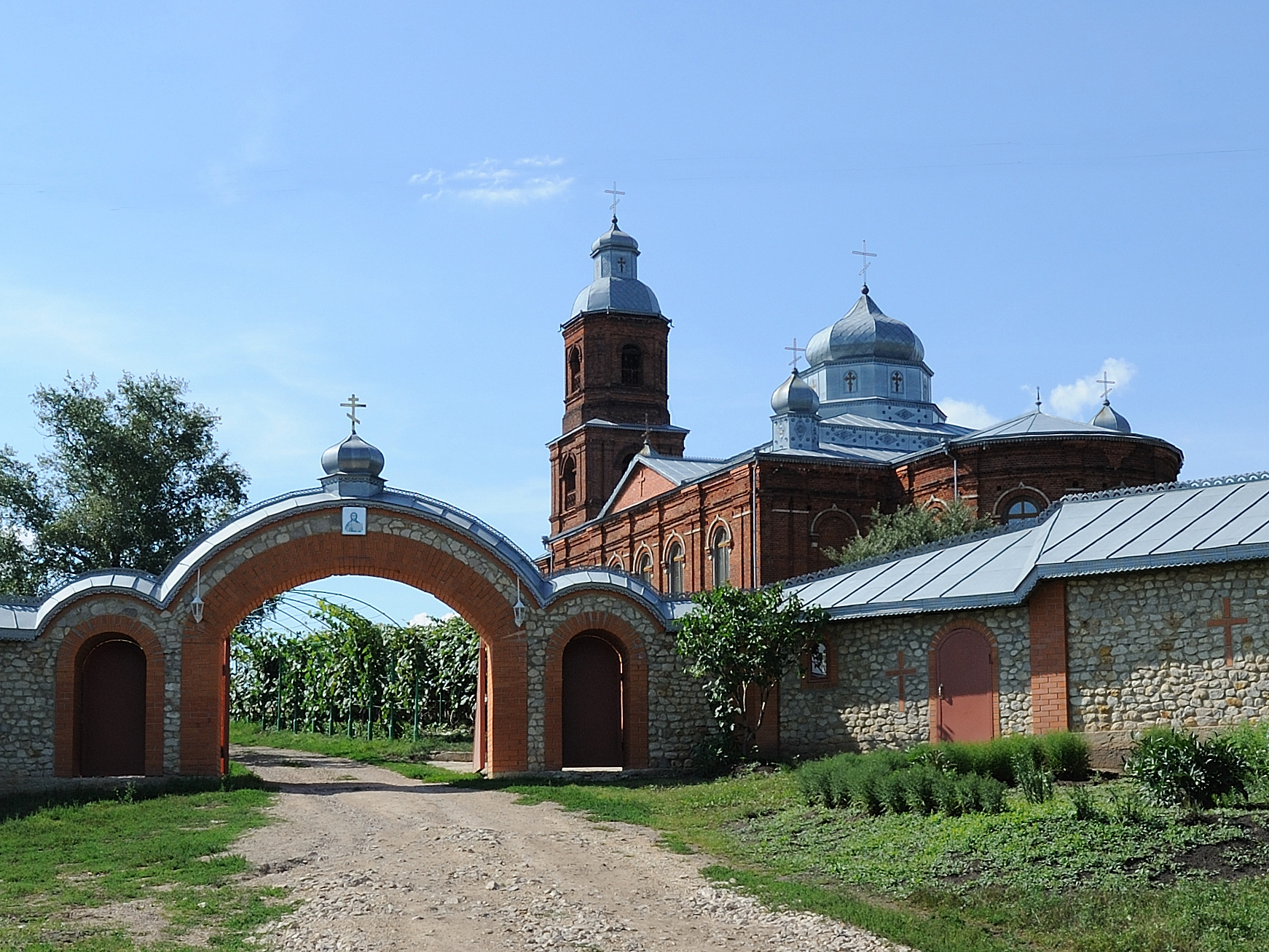
- Church Of The Archangel Michael, Skopinsky District

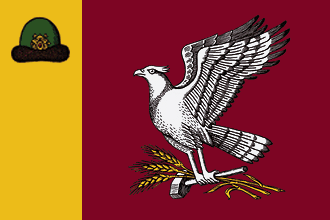
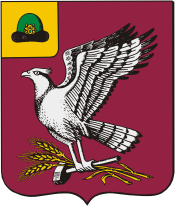
- Flag Coat of arms
- Location of Skopinsky District in Ryazan Oblast
- Coordinates: 53°49′N 39°33′E
- Country: Russia
- Federal subject: Ryazan Oblast
- Established: 12 July 1929
- Administrative center: Skopin

Area
  - Total: 1,720 km^{2} (660 sq mi)

Population (2010 Census)
  - Total: 27,080
  - Density: 15.7/km^{2} (40.8/sq mi)
  - Urban: 12.6%
  - Rural: 87.4%

Administrative structure
  - Administrative divisions: 2 Work settlements, 27 Rural okrugs
  - Inhabited localities: 2 urban-type settlements, 126 rural localities

Municipal structure
  - Municipally incorporated as: Skopinsky Municipal District
  - Municipal divisions: 2 urban settlements, 7 rural settlements
- Time zone: UTC+3 (MSK)
- OKTMO ID: 61644000
- Website: http://skopin-adm.ru/

Skopinsky District (Russian: Скопи́нский райо́н) is an administrative and municipal district (raion), one of the twenty-five in Ryazan Oblast, Russia. It is located in the southwest of the oblast. The area of the district is 1,720 square kilometers (660 sq mi). Its administrative center is the town of Skopin (which is not administratively a part of the district). Population: 27,080 (2010 Census); 31,142 (2002 census); 40,965 (1989 Soviet census).

== Administrative and municipal status ==
Within the framework of administrative divisions, Skopinsky District is one of the twenty-five in the oblast. The town of Skopin serves as its administrative center, despite being incorporated separately as a town of oblast significance—an administrative unit with the status equal to that of the districts.

As a municipal division, the district is incorporated as Skopinsky Municipal District. The town of oblast significance of Skopin is incorporated separately from the district as Skopin Urban Okrug.

On 7 October 2020, a grass fire reached ammunition in open storage at Military Unit Number 55443 (once maybe the GRAU’s 97th Arsenal) near Zheltukhino (ru:Желтухино (деревня, Рязанская область)) in Skopinsky District, Ryazan Oblast, igniting munitions. Whether GRAU or the Western Military District was responsible for the depot was not clear. Interfaks-AVN wrote that there were 113 warehouses and bunkers with 75,000 tons of missiles, rockets, and artillery shells (including 152-mm) at the site. A women died from injuries and there were at least another 15 victims in stable condition; the fire and explosions "damaged 430 structures, public facilities, apartment buildings, and private homes."
