= Sucu Sucu =

"Sucu Sucu" is a dance and a song written by Tarateño Rojas from Bolivia, who recorded his version in 1959. It became very popular in the 1960s and many singers and bands from all over the world made their own version of the song often in their own language. The song became even more popular worldwide once it was chosen to be the theme of Top Secret, a 1960s TV series, performed by Laurie Johnson and his orchestra. Diverse acts such as the Skatalites and Alberto Cortez did their own version of the song.

== Different versions ==
=== Czechoslovak version ===
- Sláva Kunst Se Svým Orchestrem - Sucu Sucu

=== Danish version ===
- John Hatting – Sucu Sucu
- Posten Fra Ranum - Sucu Sucu

=== Dutch version ===
- Eddy Christiani – Sucu Sucu (Mijn sombrero) (1961)

=== English versions ===
- Harry Stoneham - Sucu Sucu (1970)
- Nina & Frederik - Sucu Sucu (1961)
- The Polka Dots - Sucu sucu (1961)

=== Finnish version ===
- Brita Koivunen - Sucu Sucu (1961)
- Kai Lind - Sucu Sucu (1961)
- Seppo Pirhonen - Sucu Sucu (1961)
- Iskelmälaulaja Arokanto Ja Viihdeorkesteri Tempo - Sucu Sucu (1983)

=== French/Arabic version ===
- Bob Azzam / The Leiber-Stoller Big Band '60 - Sucu sucu

=== German versions ===
- Die Amigos - Sucu Sucu
- Victor Silvester and His Ballroom Orchestra - Sucu Sucu (1967)
- Los Cucarachas - Sucu Sucu (1988)

=== Hindi version ===
- Shankar Jaikishan - Aiyayya karoon main kya Sucu Sucu, Film Junglee (1961)

=== Instrumental versions ===
- Frits Stein - Sucu sucu
- The Laurie Johnson Orchestra - Sucu sucu (From TV Series "Top Secret")
- Joe Loss - Sucu sucu
- Eddie Calvert - Sucu Sucu (1965)
- Sonora Palacio - El sucu sucu
- James Wright and his orchestra - Sucu Sucu
- Tono Quirazco - Sucu sucu
- Poly e Seu Conjunto - Suco Suco (1961)

=== Italian version ===
- Maja Brunner - Sucu sucu
- Cristiano Malgioglio - Sucu sucu (2022)

=== Jamaican version ===
- The Skatalites - Sucu Sucu (1980)

=== Japanese version ===
- The Peanuts - Sucu Sucu (1961)

=== Latvian version ===
- Andris Ērglis - Suku Suku (2016 Kuldīgas koncerts)

=== Norwegian versions ===
- The Monn Keys - Sucu sucu (1961)
- Banana Airlines - Sucu Sucu (1983)

=== Polish version ===
- Irena Santor - Sucu sucu (1963)

=== Russian version ===
- Evgeny Belyaev & Alexandrov Ensemble - Малыш (Kid) (1961, lyrics in Russian and Spanish)

=== Spanish versions ===
- Ping Ping - Sucu sucu (1960)
- Caterina Valente - Sucu Sucu (1960)
- Tarateño Rojas - Sucu Sucu (1961)
- Alberto Cortez / Hugo Diaz y su Conjunto from the Argentine National Ballet - Sucu sucu (1960)
- Chico Del Rio / y su Combo - Sucu-Sucu (1961)
- Belisario Lopez - El sucu sucu
- Los Wawanco - El Baile Del Sucu Sucu
- Los Prendados - Sucu sucu
- Maria Zamora - Sucu sucu
- Los Matecoco - Sucu sucu
- Pilar Morales Y Conjunto De Fernando Orteu - Sucu sucu
- Xavier Cugat - Sucu Sucu (1961)
- Trio Guarania - Sucu Sucu (1969)
- Eddy Christiani - Sucu, Sucu

=== Swedish versions ===
- Cool Candys - Sucu, Sucu
- Lars Lönndahl - Sucu, Sucu

=== Swiss versions ===
- Hazy Osterwald - Sucu Sucu
- Lys Assia - Sucu-Sucu (1961)

=== Yugoslavian versions ===
- Ivo Robić - Suku Suku
- Gabi Novak – Suku, Suku (1961)
