= Evgeny Belyaev =

Evgeny Belyaev Евгений Беляев
- Evgeny Belyaev

Background information
- Born: 11 September 1926; Klintsy, Russian SFSR, Soviet Union
- Died: 21 February 1994 (aged 67) Moscow, Russia
- Genres: Opera, Romantic music, military music, ethnic Russian music, easy listening, middle of the road, folk music.
- Occupation: Alexandrov Ensemble soloist
- Years active: 1955–1992
- Labels: Kultur, BMG, EMI, Melodiya, Silva, Teldec, Victor, Columbia. Supraphon,

Evgeny Mikhailovich Belyaev (Note: Russian: Евгений Михайлович Беляев, romanized: Yevgeny Mikhaylovich Belyayev) (11 September 1926 – 21 February 1994) was a Russian tenor soloist of the Alexandrov Ensemble under Boris Alexandrov. He is remembered in the Soviet Union as the Russian Nightingale and in the West as one of the definitive singers of Kalinka.

== Biography ==
=== Early years and private life ===
On 11 September 1926, he was born in Klintsy in the Bryansk Oblast. As a child, he was known by the diminutive, Zhenia (the soft "g" of Bryansk). As a schoolboy he won a singing competition at the Artek (camp) (Young Pioneer camp) near the Black Sea.

During World War II he served in the subdivision of zenith troops and gained the Army Olympiad Prize. He fought in Czechoslovakia and served as a Lance Corporal in the first Red Orders of Suvorov and Kutuzov division of the Carpathian Military District of the 4th Ukrainian Front under the command of General-Colonel Andrei Yeremenko. He is also said to have been in an anti-aircraft warfare unit and to have finished the war as a sergeant. He is said to have sung in the lulls between the fighting. (NB: The Suvorov and Kutuzov division later became the 93rd Mechanized Brigade (Ukraine)).

He then graduated from Gnessin State Musical College. He married and had two sons, one of whom was a professional pianist.

=== Musical career ===
1947: He was a soloist of the Ensemble of Song and Dance of the Carpathian military district.

1952: He became a Member of the Communist Party of the Soviet Union (CPSU).

1955: He was a soloist of the Ensemble of Song and Dance of the Soviet Army of Alexandrov (Alexandrov Ensemble). Under conductor Boris Alexandrov he recorded many songs, and performed all over the world: e.g. Europe, USA, Canada and Japan. The Ensemble performed music by Soviet composers, and Russian and Ukrainian folk songs. Kalinka always drew special applause. During his time as soloist with the Ensemble, Belyaev's singing teacher was Yevgeny Kanger, who only trained the leading soloists.

1958: Received the title: Honoured Artist of Russia (Meritorious Artist).

1960: Received the title: People's Artist of Russia.

1967: He was made People's Artist of the USSR. 1960s-1970s: When the ensemble visited London, Belyaev was described as the "Russian Nightingale" and "Mr Kalinka", and again "Monsieur Kalinka" in France.

1978: He won the State Prize of the USSR.

1980: He appears to have been associated in some way with Roskontsert (or Roskontserta), the big-band variety orchestra headed by the Russian jazz musician Oleg Lundstrem. Also in this year he sang the voice-over part of the cartoon rabbit in the Russian film,Pif Paf Oi Oi Oi (Russian: Пиф Паф Ой Ой Ой) (possibly Dir. Garri Bardin, 1980). This animated cartoon dramatizes via opera a Russian nursery rhyme about a hunter shooting a rabbit ("Pif-paf!") which is brought home and found to be still alive ("Oi! Oi!"). Belyaev mainly performed in small chamber concerts in Russia after he left the Ensemble.

At some point he was made Honorary Citizen of Klintsy, his home town.

1994: In the 1990s he sang with the government musical organization RosKontsert as an independent soloist. On February 21 or 22, 1994 he died. Belyaev attended Burdenko Military Hospital in Moscow with heart problems. He asked the doctors to let him go home for the weekend because there are usually no doctors during the weekend in hospitals, so they agreed. As soon as he arrived home on Kalininsky Prospekt (now Novy Arbat) in Moscow, he died straight away of a heart attack. He was buried in Moscow, not far from his fellow soloist Alexei Sergeev, in a section of Novodevichy Cemetery (Russian: Новоде́вичье кла́дбище) affiliated branch located in Kuntsevo District.

== Critical commentary ==
Belyaev is the featured soloist in a performance of “Kalinka” in a music video by the Soviet Army Chorus and Dance Ensemble. Tenor Victor Nikitin was the first singer to be known as “Mr Kalinka”. He was the ensemble’s second soloist to perform the song, after Pyotr Tverdokhlebov, and introduced the extended operatic tenor passage that has since preceded the chorus in the ensemble’s performances. “Kalinka” has remained one of the ensemble’s signature songs. Belyaev had become known as “Mr Kalinka” himself by the time of the ensemble’s 1956 tour of London. The video, filmed outdoors around 1960, shows the performers laughing and closing with a comic dance. Although the ensemble’s soloists did not usually gesture while singing, Belyaev briefly performs a Russian dance movement with his arms in the final moments of the performance.

== Notability ==
=== Worldwide fame ===
Belyaev’s work was not recognised internationally until after his death. His recorded version of "Kalinka" has since gained notability outside of the former Soviet Union on YouTube. This is partly the result of "Kalinka" being recently associated with Chelsea Football Club.

=== Russian fame ===
April 2007: In celebration of the 300th anniversary of the founding of Klintsy, Belyaev's home town, it was decided to install a bust of the singer by the sculptor A.Smirnov in the town.

February 2008: A memorial concert was given in Bryansk in memory of Belyaev. It was attended by his great-niece Ekaterina Belaeva, fellow Communist Party members, people from his hometown Klintsy, and his old musical colleagues from the Alexandrov Ensemble. On this day the Klintsovskoy children's music school was named after Evgeny Belyaev.

== Repertoire ==
His work as soloist with the Alexandrov Ensemble meant that he sang primarily songs in the Russian folk music genre, traditional songs, and other songs about Russia, besides a few foreign songs and operatic arias. For this he was considered a "national treasure".

=== Lyrical content ===
In alphabetical order of titles, with links to auto-lyrics:

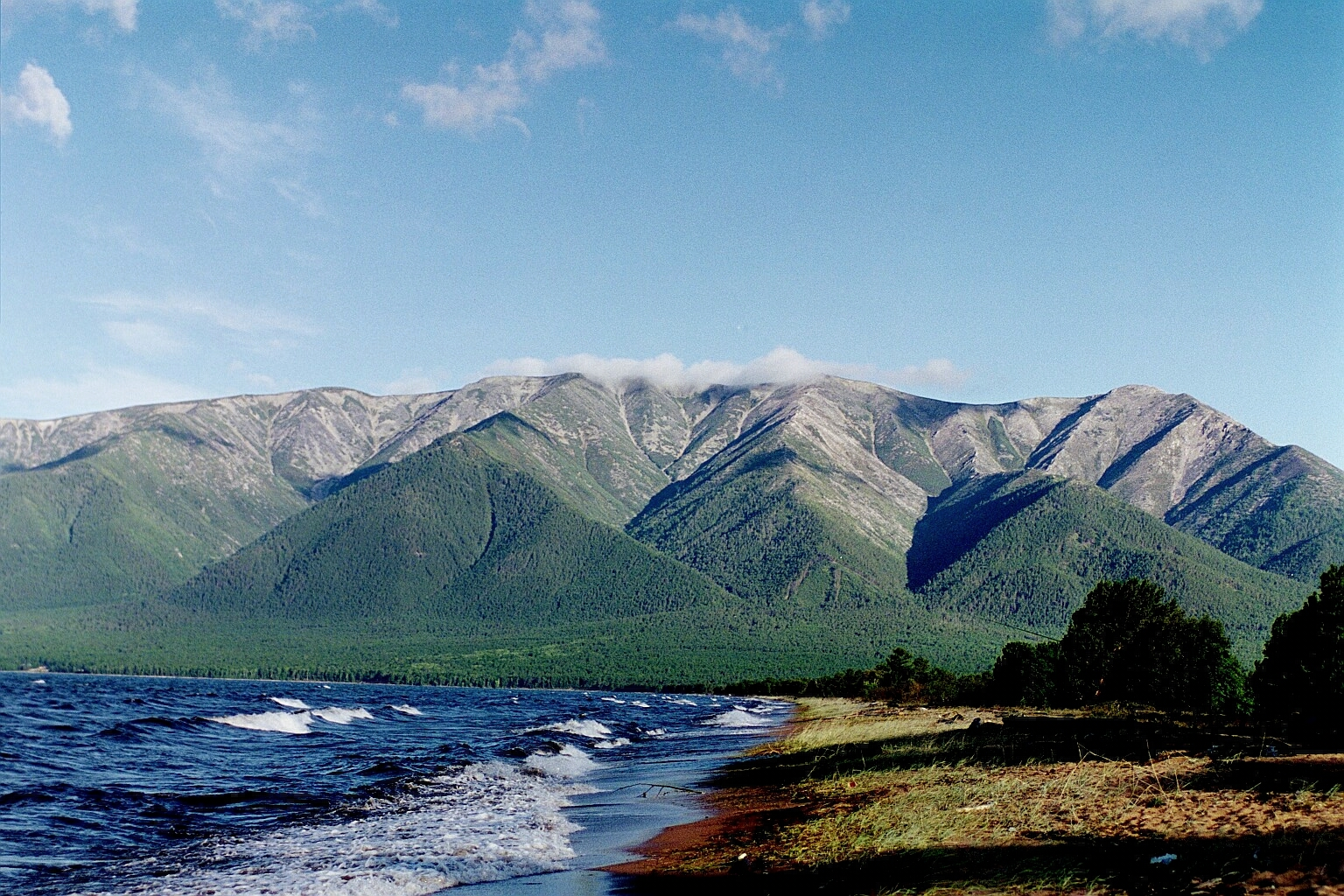
The peninsula of Svyatoy Nos, Lake Baikal.

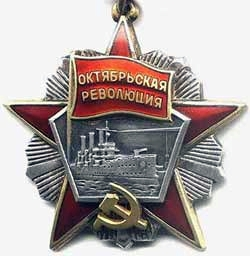
Cruiser Aurora is pictured on the Order of the October Revolution.

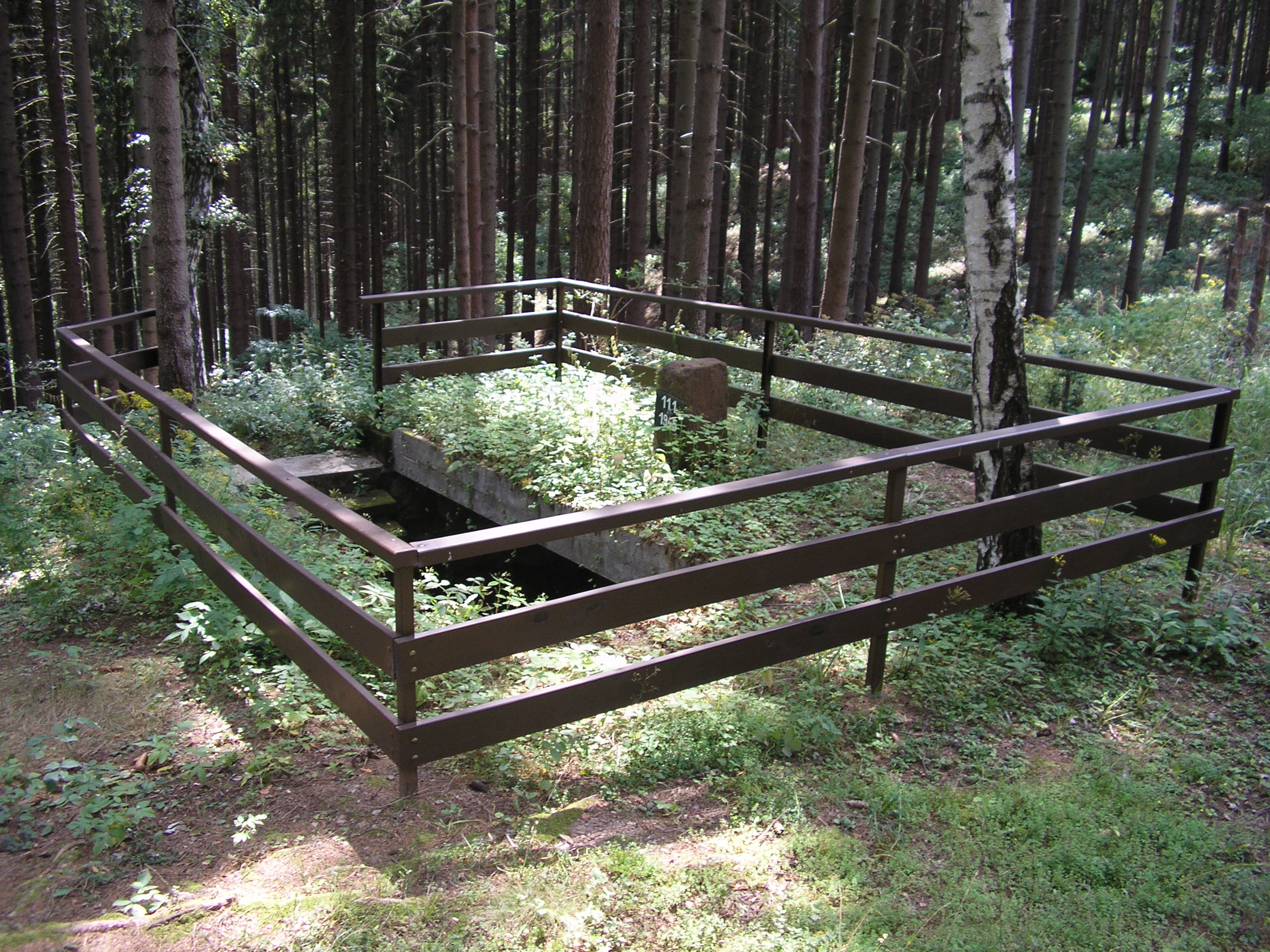
A Zemlyanka or dugout used by partisans in the Czech Republic, now a World War II memorial.

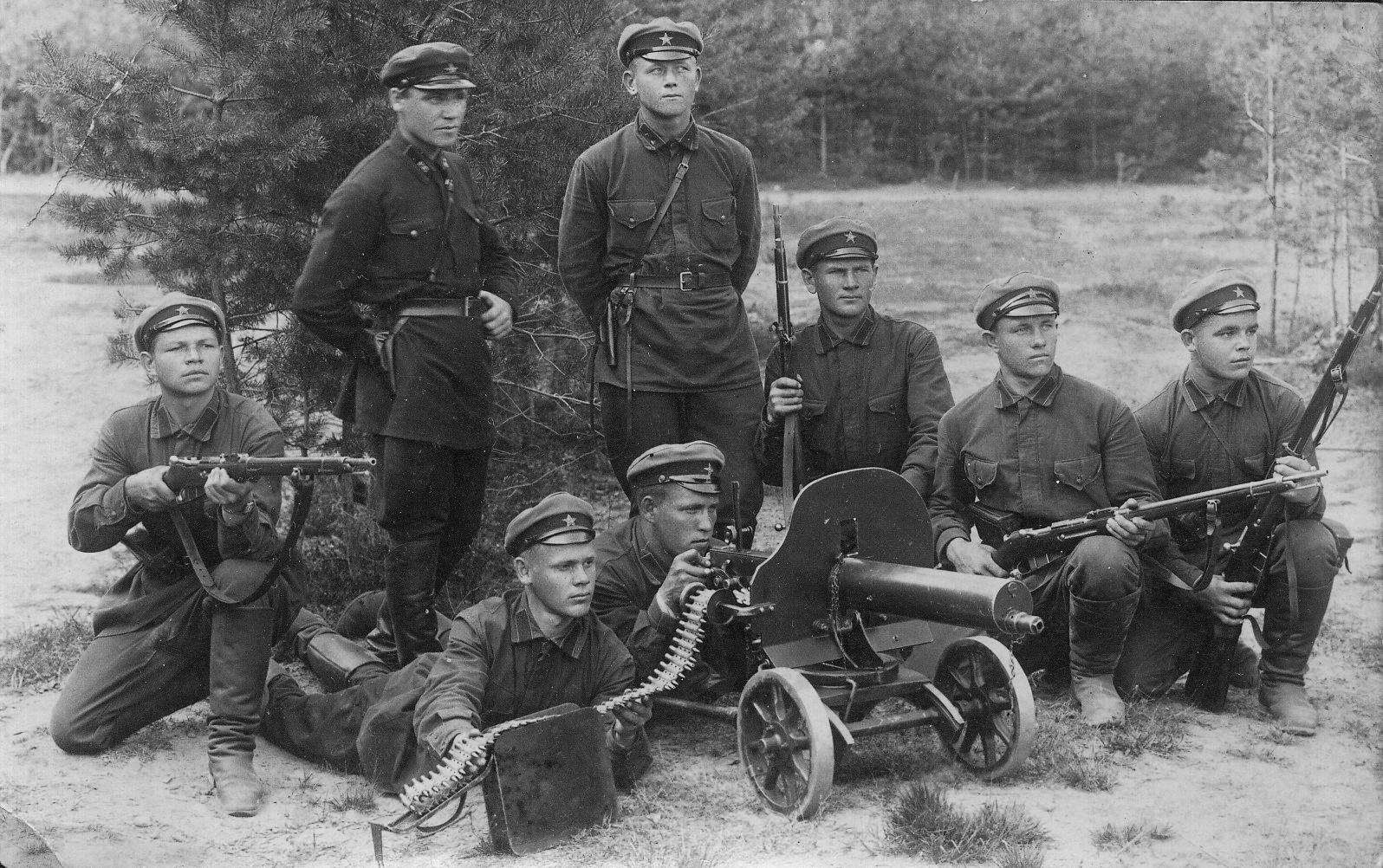
Red Army soldiers with the Maxim gun, c. 1930.

"Accidental Waltz": Probably a love song (lyrics unavailable).

"And Again I Am in Line": Song of the veteran pilots of World War II, and their replacement by younger pilots.

"Baikal Beauty" recalls beautiful Lake Baikal and a girl at home for the homesick soldier.

"Before the Long Journey" remembers preparations for people's long journeys in the past; comparing them with the preparations of modern astronauts. Possibly sung as a tribute to Yuri Gagarin and his fellow astronauts.

"Bryanski Partisan Song": A guerilla song about Soviet partisans that mentions an ambush, burnt houses and revenge.

"By Mostochku Narrow": Possibly a veteran soldier's reminiscences (lyrics unavailable).

"Choir of Sailors from the Opera Dawn": (lyrics unavailable).

"Click the Guy": About soldiers, girls and Moscow (lyrics unavailable).

"The Cruiser Aurora": "What do you dream of, cruiser Aurora, in the hour when the morning comes on the Neva?" The Aurora is a symbol of the Communist Revolution, and she has been a museum ship on the Neva at St. Petersburg since 1957.

"Donetski Night": refers to the horror of the Battle of Stalingrad, and optimism about a woman (lyrics unavailable).

"Evening on the Road"/"Night on the Road": A sailors' song about going to sea.

"Far Far Away": About border guards far from home, protecting their homeland.

"Favourite Remember Us": Possibly about soldiers under orders, who know they will not come back (lyrics unavailable).

"Immortelle": Ballad about the death by the River Don of a heroic Cossack soldier, his body guarded by a single immortelle or everlasting Helichrysum flower, which according to the lyric does not bend with the wind.

"In a Sunny Forest Clearing": A soldier's love song.

"In the Dugouts"': A soldier in his dugout in the snow, sings to his accordion about his girl far away, and feels warm at the thought before he dies.

"Kalinka": A song about a snowball tree.

"Nightingales" ("Solovii"): The lyric of "Nightingales" asks the nightingale to be quiet as the soldiers are sleeping. The song says that they need to sleep in preparation for the next battle, and there is an implication in the music that they may not come home. It is possible to interpret their next battle in relation to the afterlife, so the audience has the option to infer that they have died.

"Ogonek": Possibly about a girl and a soldier. It may refer to Ogonyok, (Russian: Огонёк), which means "little flame", as a symbol of love (lyrics unavailable).

"Oh You Rye": A love song (lyrics unavailable).

"Cold Waves Lapping": (lyrics unavailable).

"'Ridna My Mother": (lyrics unavailable).

"Rodina": About the Russian landscape.

"Russian Field"': The Russian landscape as Fatherland.

"Shooting Kommunarov": A war story to give encouragement to fight.

"Sing Soldiers": A hearty song for military morale.

"Song of Russia": The Russian landscape and Vladimir Lenin.

Two Maxim: a machine-gun song (lyrics unavailable).

"Where Are You Now, Friends": About soldiers returning from World War II.

== Recorded songs ==
In date order of original recording dates (not album production dates). Some original recordings have been recycled over many albums, and this is still happening - especially with some earlier recordings - due to their continuing popularity.

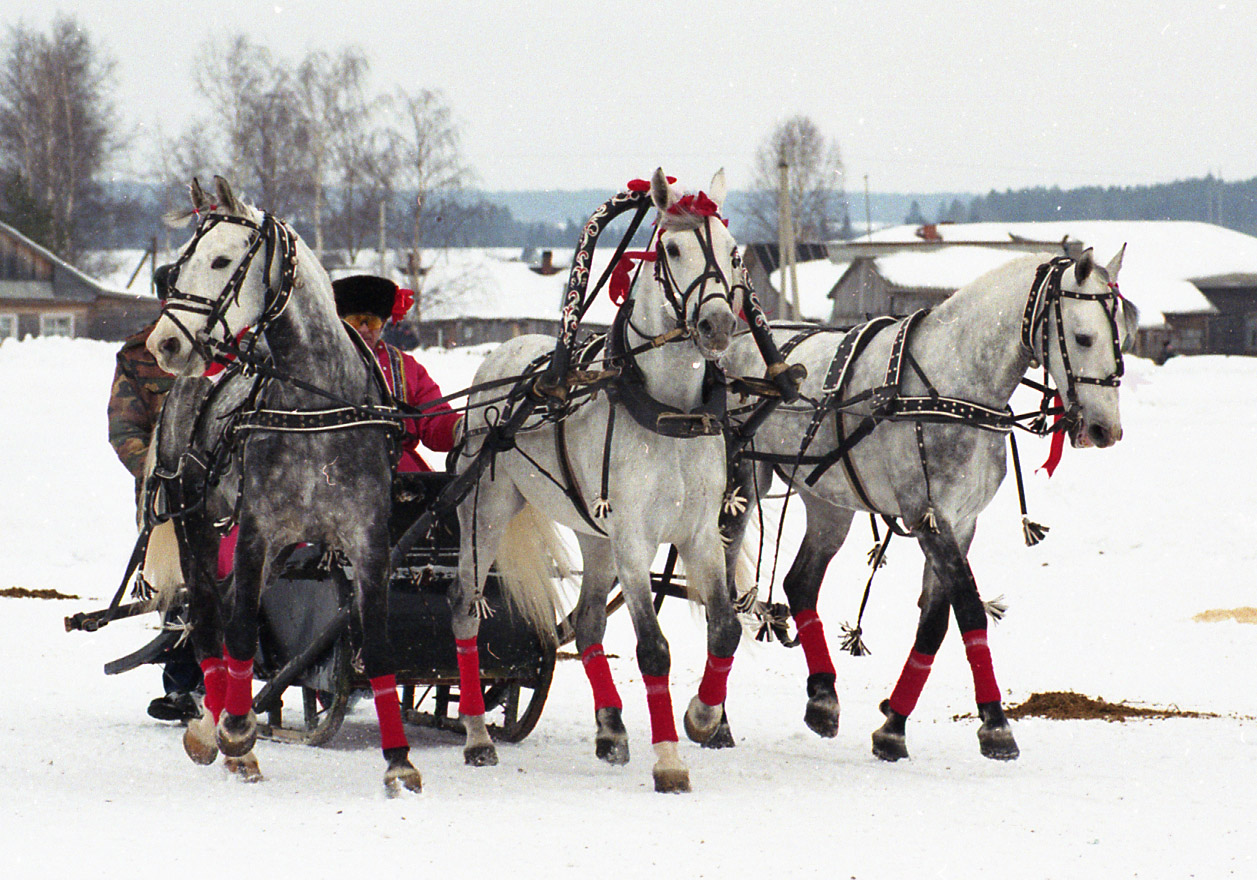
Troika of Moscow stud performing at Vologda racecourse.

=== Key to links ===
(a): from Japanese "Red Army" webpage, for images of past album sleeves containing tracks by Belyaev.
(b): from Amazon for current albums containing tracks by Belyaev.

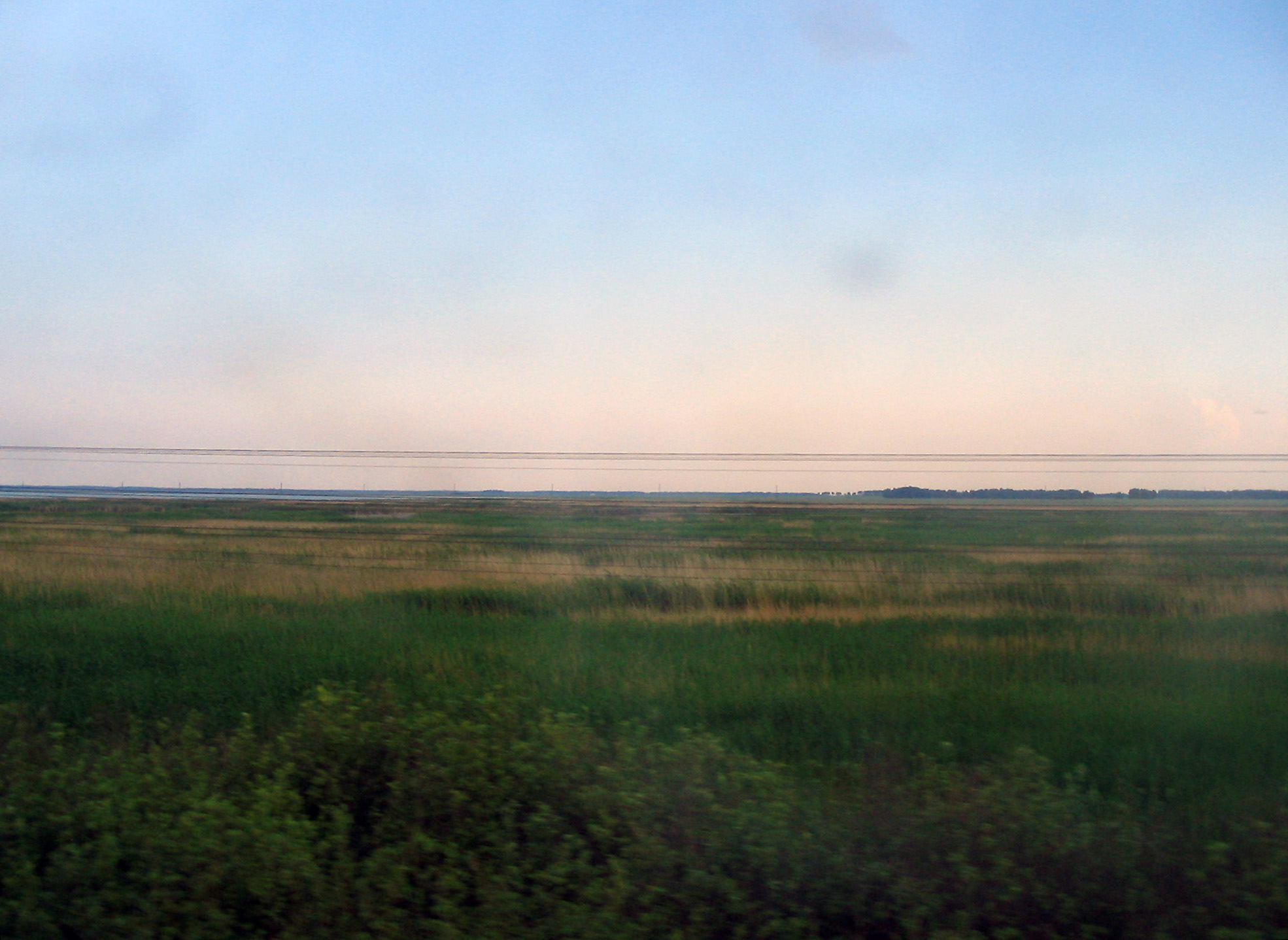
In the Central Steppes refers to the vast dry grasslands of Russia.

=== 1950s ===
"Oh You Rye" (1950; 1964; 1978; 1992) (composer A. Doluhanyan; lyrics A. Newcomer 1950)
(a):
(b):

"Choir of Sailors from the Opera Dawn" (1954) (composer K. Molchanov; lyrics S. Severtsov): no data

"Cold Waves Lapping" (1954) (composer F. Bogoroditsky; lyrics Ya Repninsky): no data

"Kalinka" (1956; 1963; 1978; 1992).
(a):
(b):

"Annie Laurie" (1956; 1963).
(a):
(b):

"You Are Always Beautiful" (1956; 1963).
(a):

(b):

"Forever" (1956; 1963).
(a):

"Far Away" (1956) (composer G. Nosov; lyrics A. Churkin 1950).
(b):

"Troika" (1959) (Traditional).
(a):

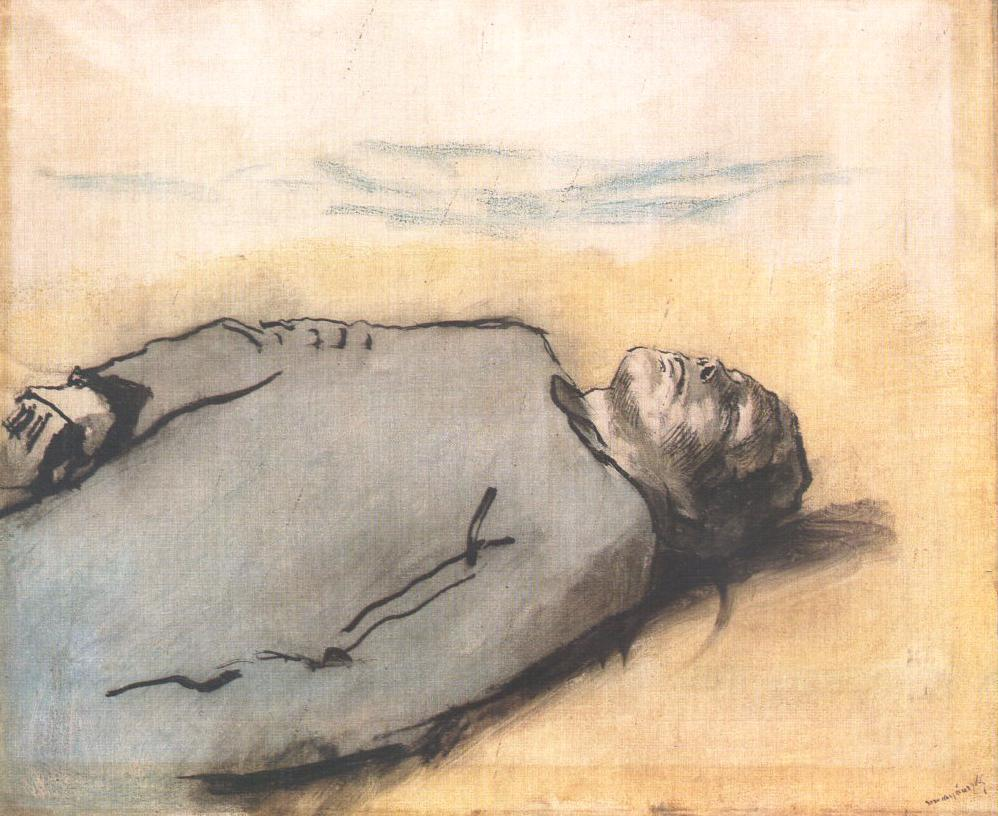
Mednyánszky's Fallen Russian Soldier (1914-7), the subject of Nightingale.

=== 1960s ===
"Ridna My Mother" (1960) (composer P. Maiboroda; lyrics A. Malyshko: no data

"By Mostochku Narrow" (1960) (composer K. Akimov; lyrics M. Vershinin): no data

"Beautiful Moonlit Night" (or "Moonlight") (1960; 1963).
(a):
(b):

"Sing Soldiers", or "That Soldier Sings" (1960) (composer A. Doluhanyan; lyrics Nekrasova L. 1955)
(a):

"I Will Be a Soldier Again" (1960s?).
(a):

"Where Are Your Arms" (1948–65; 1985).
(a):

"My Country I Pledge To You" (1963?).
(a):

"Nightingales" (1963; 1975; 1978) (composer V.Solovev-Sedoy; lyrics A. Fatyanov)
(a):
(b):

"Near the Garden" (1963).
(a):

"Before the Long Journey" (1964) (composer Matvey Blanter; lyrics Vladimir Dyhovichny 1962)
(a):

"Song of Russia" (1964) (composer D. Kabalevsky; lyrics A. Newcomer)
(a):

"Come My Way" (ca.1965).
(a):

"Where This Country Was Built" (1965).
(a):

"On a Hill" (1968).
(a):

"Gorondorina La"' (1968).
(a):

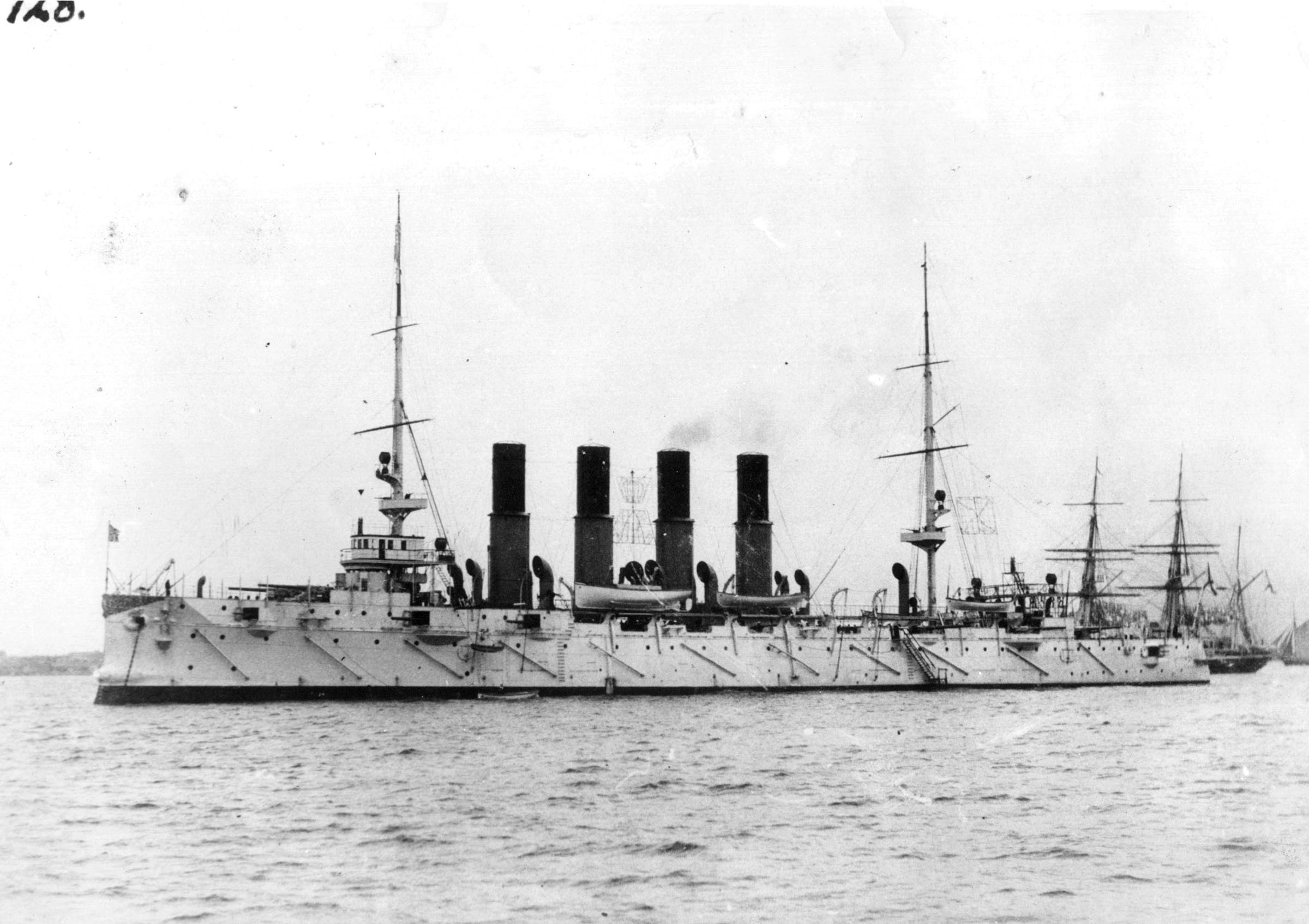
Russian cruiser Varyag moored in the roadstead 1901. Evening on the Road tells of a peaceful evening such as this.

=== 1970s ===
"Russia" (ca.1970).
(a):

"Song of the Klintsah" (Oct 1971) (composer A. Kulygin, lyrics A. Annual 1971) broadcast in the USSR on All-Union Radio, to celebrate Belyaev's home town Klintsy. He performed the song in concerts in the Bryansk region in 1975.

"Album:Русские Песни И Романсы"(1973) CM 03831-2.

"'Wilderness" (1974).
(a):

The Russian Field (1975) (composer J. Frenkel; lyrics I. Goff 1965)
(a):

In My Moscow Suburb (ca.1975?).
(a):

In the Dugouts (1975; 1977) (composer K. Sheets; lyrics A. Surkov 1942): no data

Accidental Waltz (1977) (composer M. Fradkin; lyrics E. Dolmatovskaya): no data

Ogonek (1977) (lyrics M.Isakovsky): no data

My Favourite (1977) (composer M. Blanter; lyrics E. Dolmatovskaya 1942): no data

Two Maxim (1977) (composer S. Katz; lyrics M. Plyatskovsky 1941): no data

You Who Love (1978).
(a):

Catalina (1978).
(a):

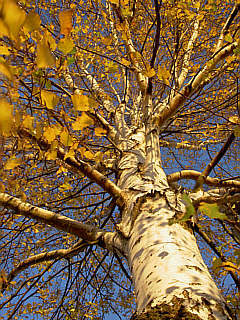
The Birch Tree is a very old, traditional song about a lad sitting under a birch, whittling and thinking of women.

=== 1980s ===
Evening on the Waterfront (1985).
(a):

Evening on the Road/Night on the Road (undated) (composer V. Solovyov-Sedoy; lyrics A. Churkin 1943). Duet with Boris G. Shapenko)

Execution of the Warrior Revolution (1987)
(a):

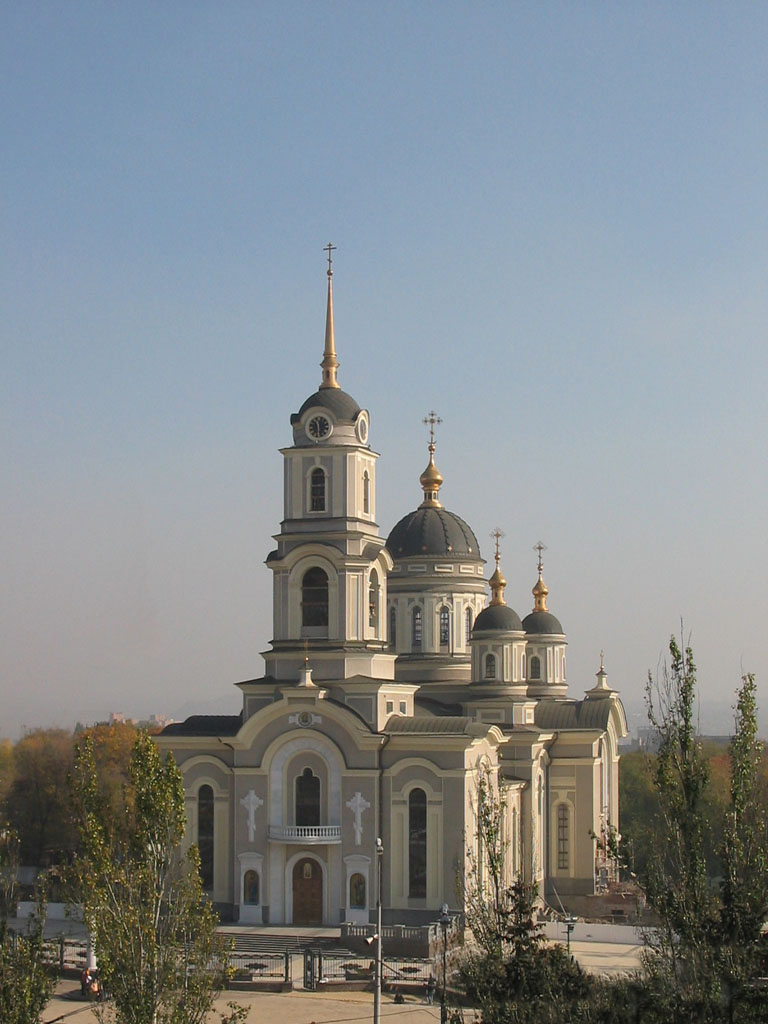
Donetski Nights is about the Battle of Stalingrad, but the coal-mining city of Donetsk was also destroyed in World War II and then rebuilt, including this cathedral.

=== 1990s ===
In the Sunny Meadow/Shine in the Field (1992).
(a):
(b):

Black Eyebrows (1992).
(a):
(b):

Happy Girl (1992).
(a):
(b):

Birch Tree Stood in the Meadow (1992).
(a):
(b):

In the Forest (1992).
(a):
(b):

Wait For Your Soldier/Wait a Day to Return (1992).
(a):
(b):

Motherland/Country (1992).
(a):
(b):

=== Undated ===
Lying (undated).
(a): no data

Take a Bandura (undated).
(a):

Our Friends (undated).
(a):

Hey Girl (undated).
(a):

Rough sea spray (cruiser "VARYAGU") (undated).
(a):

The Cruiser Aurora (undated) (music: V.Shainskiy; lyrics: M.Matusovskiy)

Soldier's Wife (undated).
(a):

Epitaph (undated).
(a):

In the Central Steppes (undated).
(b):

Baikal Beauty (undated) (composer A. Doluhanyan; lyrics M. Lisyansky): no data

Immortelle (undated) (composer S. Zaslavsky; lyrics A. Sofronov): no data

Donetski Night (undated) (composer E. Zharkovsky; lyrics N. Upenik, L. Titova 1975): no data

Where Are You Now, Friends (undated) (composer V. Solovyov-Sedoy; lyrics A. Fatyanov 1947): no data

And Again I am In Line (undated) (composer B. Muradeli; lyrics S. Bencken 1960): no data

Favourite, Remember Us (undated) (composer Boris Alexandrov; lyrics N. Dobronravov 1978): no data

In a Sunny Forest Clearing (undated) (composer V.P.Solovev-Sedoy; lyrics A. Fatyanov 1970): no data

Bryansky Partisan Song (undated) (composer D. Kabalevsky; lyrics V.Lebedev-Kumach). Duet with Alexei T. Sergeev: no data.

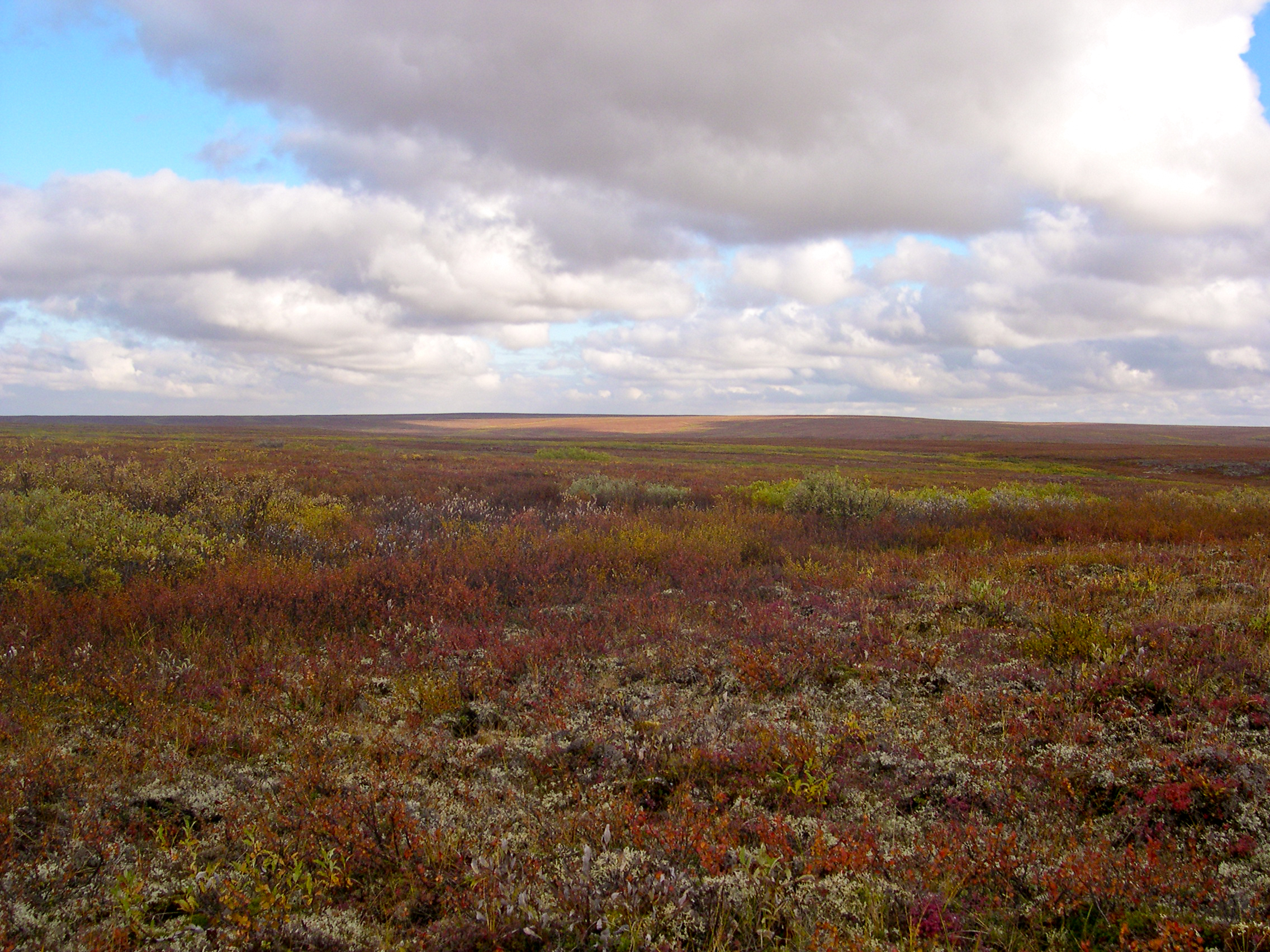
I Took You Into the Tundra refers to the cold, treeless zone all along the northern edge of Russia.

Shooting Kommunarov (undated) (composer V.Tan-Bogoraz): no data

Rodina (undated) (composer A. Samoylov; lyrics F. Savinov): no data

Click the Guy (undated) (composer LA Shats; lyrics V. Alferov 1977): no data

At the Gate, The Gate (undated) (traditional): no data

I Left the Army (undated) (composer S. Tulika; lyrics V. Malkov): no data

I Loved You (undated) (composer B.Sheremetyev; lyrics Pushkin): no data

I Met You (undated) (composer B.Sheremetyev; lyrics F.Tyutchev): no data

It Evokes Memories (undated) (composer P.Bulakhov): no data

I Took You into the Tundra (undated) (composer M. Fradkin; lyrics M. Plyatskovsky): no data.

Listen If You Want (undated) (composer N.Shiskin): no data

My Moscow (undated) (composer O. Feltsman; lyrics A. Sofronov): no data

Separation (undated) (composer A.Gurilev; lyrics A.Koltsov): no data

Soldiers' Mothers (undated) (composer Boris Alexandrov; lyrics S. Bencken): no data

Soldiers Pribautki (undated) (composer A. Doluhanyan; lyrics G. Hodos). Duet with B. Ruslanov: no data

Unselfish Soul (undated) (composer A. Pakhmutova; lyrics M. Lisyansky): no data

We Went Out Into the Garden (undated) (composer M.Tolstoy; lyrics A.Butt): no data

The Book Motherland (undated) (composer Boris Alexandrov; lyrics N. Dorizo): no data

Kid (Sucu Sucu) (undated, 1960s?) (composer Tarateño Rojas; translator unknown, Russian & Spanish)

To You I Swear the Fatherland (undated): no data

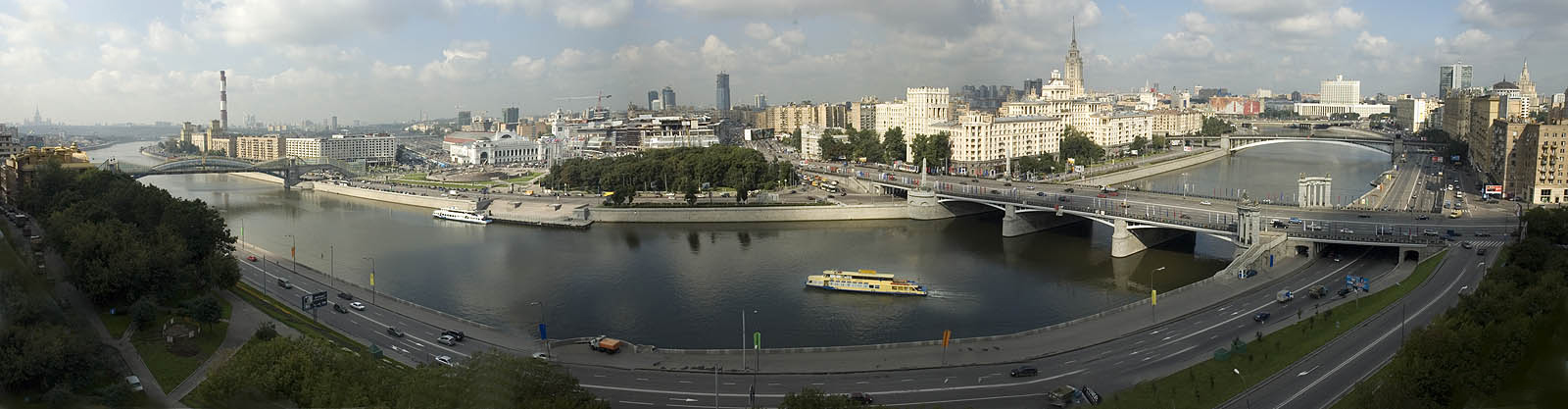
The Alexandrov Ensemble performs numerous songs about Moscow, including My Moscow, which was recorded with E. Belyaev as soloist.

== Discography ==
His 78s, LPs, CDs and DVDs are listed on the Alexandrov Ensemble discography page.

== See also ==
- Alexandrov Ensemble
- Alexandrov Ensemble soloists
- Alexandrov Ensemble choir
- Alexandrov Ensemble discography
- Georgi Pavlovich Vinogradov
