= Top Secret (TV series) =

British TV spy series (1961–1962)

Top Secret is a British TV spy series broadcast in two seasons on ITV in 1961-1962 which was produced by Associated-Rediffusion. It starred William Franklyn as suave secret agent Peter Dallas, over a total of 26 black-and-white episodes, each filling a 60 minutes slot. All episodes also featured Patrick Cargill as wealthy businessman Miguel Garetta, and Alan Rothwell as Dallas's nephew Mike.

== Outline ==
The series was produced by Associated-Rediffusion Television. The directors were Adrian Brown and Raymond Menmuir, and the main writer was Cedric Wells. The series was set in South America, and was filmed partly in Argentina, with the interior sets in a London studio.

The main theme music - '"Sucu Sucu" - was composed by Tarateño Rojas and performed by Laurie Johnson and his orchestra. Laurie Johnson was part of the worldwide trend that was covering this song in many different languages. It was a minor hit and entered the UK pop music charts.

== List of episodes ==
Episode titles are given below, with original broadcast dates in brackets.

Series 1

- Episode 1: "Destination Buenos Aires" (11 August 1961)
- Episode 2: "Death on Wheels" (18 August 1961)
- Episode 3: "The Dead Village" (25 August 1961)
- Episode 4: "Merchant of Death" (1 September 1961)
- Episode 5: "The Inca Dove" (8 September 1961)
- Episode 6: "Stranger in Cantabria" (15 September 1961)
- Episode 7: "Vendetta" (22 September 1961)
- Episode 8: "The Disappearing Trick" (29 September 1961)
- Episode 9: "After the Fair" (6 October 1961)
- Episode 10: "X" (13 October 1961)
- Episode 11: "The Little One Is Dangerous" (20 October 1961)
- Episode 12: "The Men from Yesterday" (27 October 1961)
- Episode 13: "Shakedown at Saramino" (3 November 1961)
- Episode 14: "Festival of Fear" (10 November 1961)

Series 2

- Episode 1: "Threat from the Past" (9 May 1962)
- Episode 2: "The Man from Carataz" (16 May 1962)
- Episode 3: "The Burning Question" (23 May 1962)
- Episode 4: "The Death of Stefano" (30 May 1962)
- Episode 5: "The Second Man" (6 June 1962)
- Episode 6: "Maggie" (13 June 1962)
- Episode 7: "The Eagle of San Gualo" (20 June 1962)
- Episode 8: "Vengeance at La Vina" (27 June 1962)
- Episode 9: "The Life Stealers" (4 July 1962)
- Episode 10: "Dangerous Project" (11 July 1962)
- Episode 11: "Dance for Spies" (18 July 1962)
- Episode 12: "Escape to Danger" (25 July 1962)

According to the lostshows.com website, no recording of any of the episodes is known to survive (See Wiping).
