= Ping Pong (singer) =

Eddy Helder (known by the stage names Ping Pong or Ping Ping, born ca. 1923/1924) is a Surinamese singer. Helder started his singing career in 1952 with the Eddy Gaddum in Antwerp. He is known for being one of the first performers of the song "Sucu Sucu" composed by the Bolivian singer Tarateño Rojas.

== Discography ==
- Ping Pong & Al Verlane - Sucu Sucu (1960)
- Ping Ping – Nix Capito / Marianne (1961)
- Ping Ping – Esperanza / Ping Ping (1962)
