= Pyatnitskoye Cemetery =

Cemetery in Moscow

Pyatnitskoye cemetery
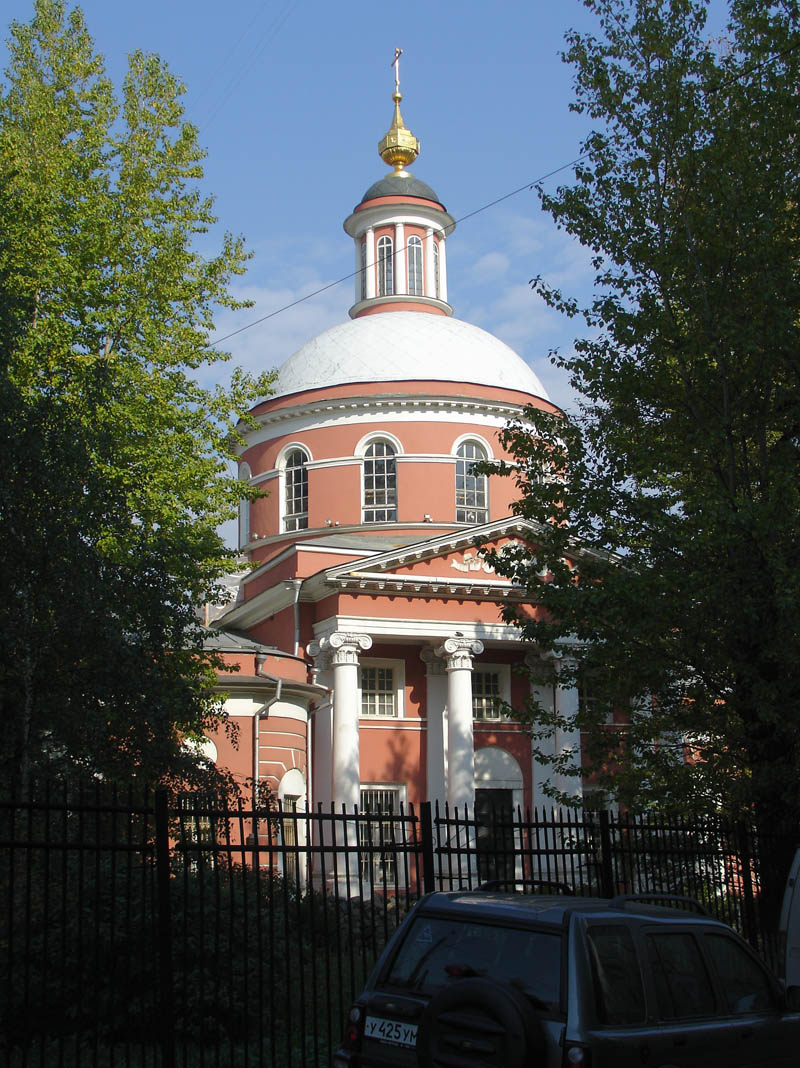
- Trinity Church in the cemetery
- Interactive map of Pyatnitskoye cemetery

Details
- Established: 1771
- Location: Moscow
- Country: Russia
- Coordinates: 55°47′59″N 37°38′36″E
- Owned by: State
- Size: 14.1 ha (35 acres)
- Find a Grave: Pyatnitskoye cemetery

The Pyatnitskoye cemetery is one of the graveyards in the Russian capital Moscow. It is among the oldest and largest resting places in the city.

== History and name ==
The Pyatnitskoye cemetery was established during the plague epidemic in 1771. However, systematic archive for burial register was started in 1940. It was named after the chapel, Paraskeva Pyatnitsa Church (Trinity Church), located in the western part of the cemetery.

== Architect and design ==
The temple in the cemetery was built by the architect A. Grigorieva in the period between 1830 and 1835. The building was designed in the Russian Empire style and decorated with a six-Tuscan portico. The temple has two chapels; Paraskeva and St. Sergius of Radonezh. Also in the cemetery there is the church of Persian Simon, built in the years between 1916 and 1917. This feature of the cemetery, namely being attached to churches, reflects the tradition of the historical Russian resting places.

== Location and size ==
The cemetery is on the northern part of Moscow. Specifically it is located in the Dzerhzhinsky district and on Droboliteiny pereulok street, lying on the side of Pyatnitskoye Highway.

The area of the graveyard is about 14.1 hectares, consisting of 30 plots.

== Burials ==
Various leading figures buried in the cemetery include Valentin Pavlov, and Victor Nikitin. However, during the Soviet era the graveyard was not one of the resting places preferred for the communist elites.
