= Kalinka (1860 song) =

Russian folk song by Ivan Larionov

Song
- Language: Russian
- Written: 1860
- Composer: Ivan Larionov
- Lyricist: Ivan Larionov

"Kalinka" (Russian: Калинка) is a Russian folk-style song written in 1860 by the composer and folklorist Ivan Larionov and first performed in Saratov as part of a theatrical entertainment that he had composed. Soon it was added to the repertoire of the folk choral group. Since the end of World War II, the song has been popularized by the Alexandrov Ensemble, the official army choir group of the Russian Armed Forces.

Albert Janpolski's rendition of the tune.

== Song ==
The refrain of the song refers to the kalinka, which is the snowball tree (Viburnum opulus). The song has a speedy tempo and light-hearted lyrics. The main refrain (Калинка, калинка, калинка моя!) increases in tempo each time it is sung. One of the best-known singers of this song was Evgeny Belyaev (1926–1994).

== Lyrics ==
Russian original	Romanization of Russian	English translation
Калинка, калинка, калинка моя! В саду ягода малинка, малинка моя! Ах, под сосною, под зеленою, Спать положите вы меня! Ай-люли, люли, ай-люли, люли, Спать положите вы меня. Калинка, калинка, калинка моя! В саду ягода малинка, малинка моя! Ах, сосёнушка, ты зеленая, Не шуми ты надо мной! Ай-люли, люли, ай-люли, люли, Не шуми ты надо мной! Калинка, калинка, калинка моя! В саду ягода малинка, малинка моя! Ах, красавица, душа-девица, Полюби же ты меня! Ай-люли, люли, ай-люли, люли, Полюби же ты меня! Калинка, калинка, калинка моя! В саду ягода малинка, малинка моя!	Kalinka, kalinka, kalinka moya! V sadu yagoda malinka, malinka moya! Akh, pod sosnoyu, pod zelenoyu, Spat' polozhite vy menya! Ay-lyuli, lyuli, ay-lyuli, lyuli, Spat' polozhite vy menya. Kalinka, kalinka, kalinka moya! V sadu yagoda malinka, malinka moya! Akh, sosyonushka, ty zelyenaya, Ne shumi ty nado mnoy; Ay-lyuli, lyuli, ay-lyuli, lyuli, Ne shumi ty nado mnoy! Kalinka, kalinka, kalinka moya! V sadu yagoda malinka, malinka moya! Akh, krasavitsa, dusha-devitsa, Polyubi zhe ty menya; Ay-lyuli, lyuli, ay-lyuli, lyuli, Polyubi zhe ty menya! Kalinka, kalinka, kalinka moya! V sadu yagoda malinka, malinka moya!	Little red berry, red berry, red berry of mine! In the garden (there is) a berry - little raspberry, raspberry of mine! Ah, under the pine, the green one, Lay me down to sleep, Oh-swing, sway, oh-swing, sway, Lay me down to sleep. Little red berry, red berry, red berry of mine! In the garden (there is) a berry - little raspberry, raspberry of mine! Ah, you, the great pine, Do not make a noise over me; Oh-swing, sway, oh-swing, sway, Do not make a noise over me! Little red berry, red berry, red berry of mine! In the garden (there is) a berry - little raspberry, raspberry of mine! Ah, beautiful woman, soul-maiden, Please, love me do, Oh-swing, sway, oh-swing, sway, Please, love me do! Little red berry, red berry, red berry of mine! In the garden (there is) a berry - little raspberry, raspberry of mine!

== Recordings and cultural influence ==
Kalinka is considered one of the most famous Russian folk and folk-style songs in Russia, and all over the world.

It appeared in the 1953 film Tonight We Sing, performed by Italian-American operatic bass and actor Ezio Pinza. The film was a semi-biography of the Russian bass Feodor Chaliapin who famously sang and, during the early days of recording, recorded the song for His Master's Voice and Victor. Pinza's recording was included on the 10-inch LP soundtrack album release of the same year, coincidentally from RCA Victor.

In Atari's 1988 version of Tetris, Kalinka is featured as one of its theme songs; however, it is labelled "KARINKA" in the NES version. Since then, Kalinka has often been included in licensed Tetris games, alongside Korobeiniki and Troika, the former of which is now commonly known as "the Tetris theme".

The 2011 Hindi film 7 Khoon Maaf directed by Vishal Bhardwaj features a track called 'Darling' and 'Doosri Darling' which is a cover with its own lyrics in Hindi.

In the video game Payday 2, released in 2013, "Kalinka" is sometimes sung by Vlad after completing the Four Stores heist.

In the video game Tom Clancy's Rainbow Six Siege, released in 2015, "Kalinka" is used in the introductory video of Tachanka.

In the video game Civilization VI, released in 2016, "Kalinka" is the theme of the Russian civilization, played when the civilization is present in a game. As the player progresses throughout the different civilization eras, additional complexity and layers are added.

"Kalinka" has been played during the closing ceremony of the 2018 FIFA World Cup in Russia by Russian soprano singer Aida Garifullina, featuring the famous former football player Ronaldinho.

"Kalinka" is sung by train passengers in Doctor Zhivago at 1:53:30.

== Mr. Kalinka ==
The arrangement of Kalinka which is traditionally performed by the Alexandrov Ensemble turned the frivolous song into an operatic aria. The first ensemble soloist to perform this was Pyotr Tverdokhlebov, but the first to earn the title of Mr. Kalinka was Viktor Nikitin at the Berlin peace concert in August 1948, where he sang three encores of the song. The title is unofficial and awarded by the audience and journalists present at successful ensemble concerts where Kalinka earns numerous encores. A definitive recording of Kalinka was made in 1963 at the Abbey Road Studios, London by the lyric tenor Evgeny Belyaev, with the Alexandrov Ensemble, under the direction of Boris Alexandrovich Alexandrov. Belyaev earned the Mr. Kalinka title at the London concerts of 1956 and 1963. Since then there have been several Mr. Kalinkas, including Vasily Ivanovich Shtefutsa and Vadim Petrovich Ananyev.
