= Ivan Larionov =

Russian composer

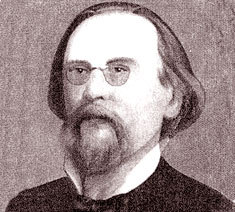
Ivan Petrovich Larionov

Ivan Petrovich Larionov (Russian: Ива́н Петро́вич Ларио́нов; January 23, 1830 – April 22, 1889) was a Russian composer, writer and folklorist. He is mostly remembered for the famous song "Kalinka", which he wrote in 1860.

Larionov was born to a noble family in Perm, and studied music in Moscow. He died in Saratov in 1889, from stomach cancer.
