= Viktor Nikitin (singer) =

Victor Nikitin
- Victor Nikitin

Background information
- Birth name: Victor Ivanovich Nikitin
- Born: 12 February 1911; Syzran, Russian Empire
- Died: 6 January 1994 (aged 82); Moscow, Russia
- Genres: Opera, Romantic music, military music, ethnic Russian music, easy listening, middle of the road, folk music.
- Occupation: Alexandrov Ensemble soloist
- Years active: 1938–1952
- Labels: BMG, EMI, Melodiya, Teldec, Victor, Columbia, Supraphon

Victor Ivanovich Nikitin (Russian: Виктор Иванович Никитин; 12 February 1911 – 6 January 1994), was a Soviet tenor soloist of the Alexandrov Ensemble. He is notable for being the first Mr Kalinka, and for being called "Ambassador Kalinka" by Erich Mückenberger after singing at the 1948 Berlin peace concert.

== Early career ==
Viktor Nikitin was born in Syzran on 12 February 1911. He was a machine engineer in 1938, and joined the Alexandrov Ensemble in the same year. He had possibly started recording by 1936. He was already known as "Mr Kalinka" before World War II.

== World War II and 1948 Berlin peace concert ==
Apparently when he sang to entertain the Soviet troops at the Eastern Front in World War II, the Germans on the other side stopped shooting to listen. The German appreciation of Nikitin did not end there. At the Alexandrov Ensemble August 1948 Peace Concert, he sang encores of Kalinka and received high praise for his singing. Before the concert he had bought a book of 10 German folk songs, and then persuaded Boris Alexandrov and the Soviet commanders to let him sing some of them in German. This would be seen by the German audience as a great commitment to peace.

A 1985 Radio DDR recording (named Auf gutem Weg Mit Guten Freunden) exists of part of this 1948 Berlin concert. Nikitin sang Im Schönsten Wiesengrunde, Ich Freue Mich Ihnen Mein Lied Zu Singen (a spoken introduction by Nikitin to Kalinka, recorded in 1988) and Kalinka. In connection with this, Nikitin was made Honoured Citizen of the German Democratic Republic. In 2007, Nikitin was still remembered by Leonid Maleev, director of the Ensemble, as the earliest "Mr Kalinka".

== Return to choir ==
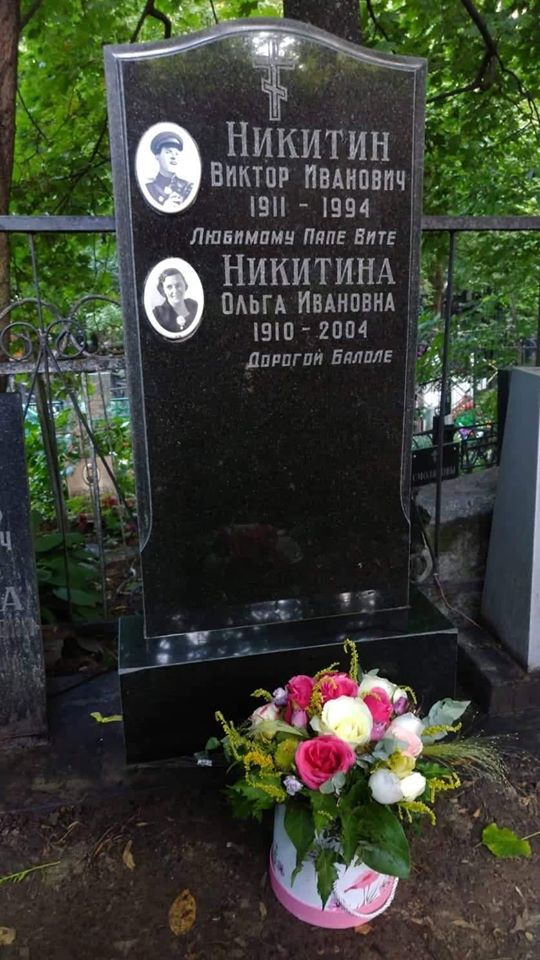
Nikitin's gravestone

It has been rumoured that Nikitin was in disgrace after singing in German in 1948, and that this eventually ended his career in 1952; however it is now said that he simply returned to the Ensemble choir in 1952, by his own choice, due to a strained or tired voice. He continued to be popular with Stalin, who used to wave to him in a friendly manner at concerts. Nikitin could not have returned to the choir without Stalin's approval; however many relevant source-documents from this era have been destroyed.

Nikitin died in Moscow 6 January 1994, aged 82. He was buried at Pyatnitskoye cemetery in Moscow.

== Discography ==
With the Alexandrov Ensemble from 1938 to 1952 he recorded Meeting with the chief (music: A. Alexandrov; lyrics: P. Herman), Cold waves lapping (music: F. Bogoroditsky; lyrics: Ya Repninsky 1950), Samovary-samopaly (or Military samovars) duet with S. Tibaev (recorded 1941), Red Fleet sailors (recorded 1943) (music A. Alexandrov; lyrics N. Labkovsky 1943), Smuglyanka, duet with N. Ustinov (recorded 1945), Kalinka, Alas nothing to please me (1946) Prague, Come to me young laddie (1946) Prague, Nightingales (music: V. Soloviev-Gray; lyrics: A. Fat'yanov) (recorded 1946), Alas nothing to please me (1948) Moscow, Come to me young laddie (1948) Prague, Troika (1948) Prague, Im schönsten Wiesengrunde (1948) Berlin, Kalinka (1948) Berlin, Heidenröslein (1948) Dresden, Evening on the waterfront solo and as duet with V.N.Katerinsky, Winter evening (1951) Prague, Down by Mother Volga. He recorded Song of my country (1951 and 26 October 1952) Prague.

== See also ==
- Alexandrov Ensemble
- Alexandrov Ensemble soloists
- Alexandrov Ensemble choir
- Alexandrov Ensemble discography
