= Eddy Christiani =

Dutch musician

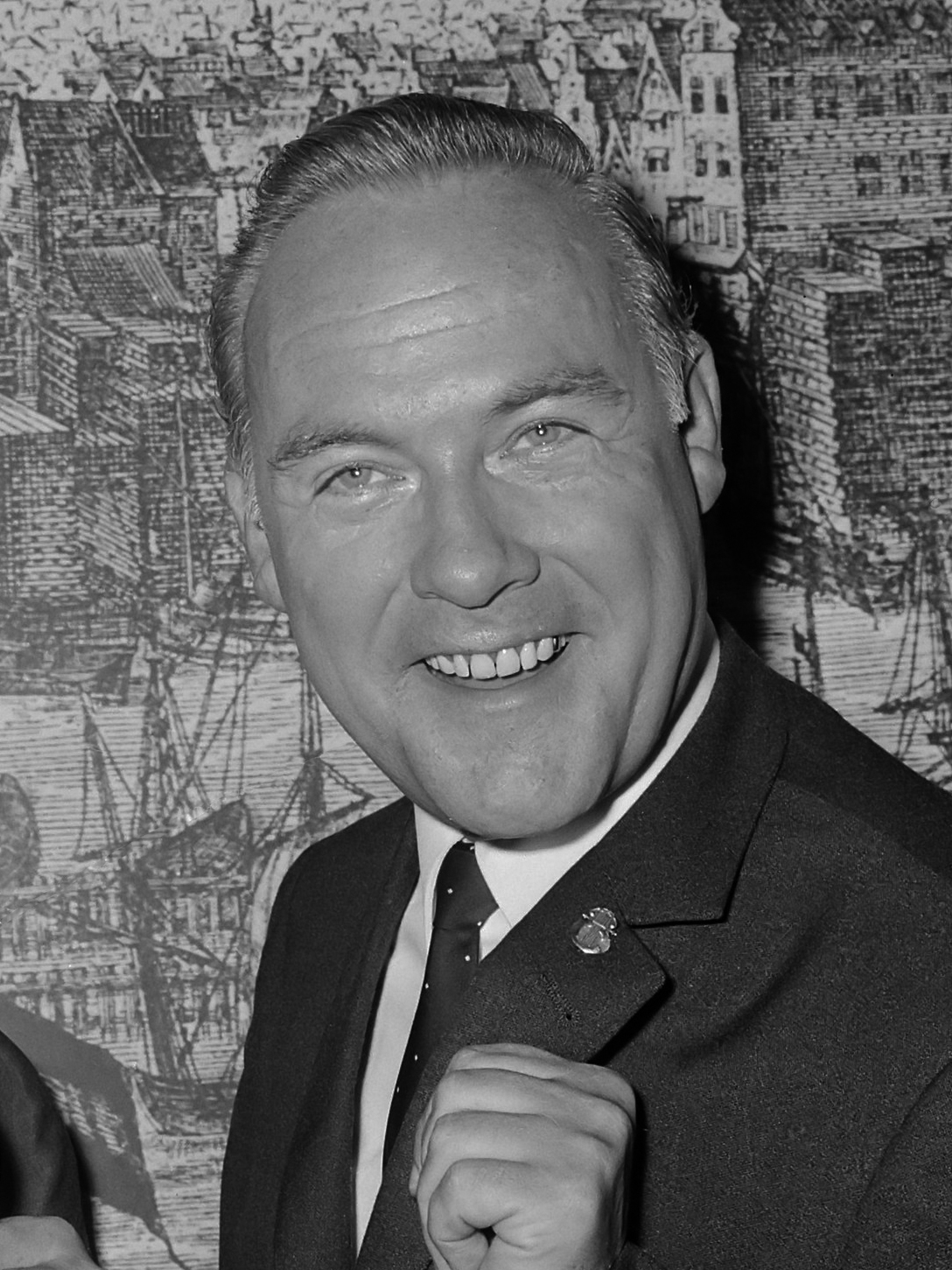
- Eddy Christiani in 1965
- Born: Eduard Christiani; 21 April 1918; The Hague, Netherlands
- Died: 24 October 2016 (aged 98)
- Occupations: Singer, composer

Eduard "Eddy" Christiani (21 April 1918 – 24 October 2016) was a Dutch guitarist, singer, and composer. He was best known for songs like Zonnig Madeira (1938), Ouwe Taaie (1943), Op De Woelige Baren (1948), Kleine Greetje Uit De Polder (1950), Spring Maar Achterop (1952), Daar Bij De Waterkant and Rosemarie Polka (1953). In 1961 he reached the 82nd position with his Spanish-language song Sucu Sucu (1961)

He reminisced about his tricky experiences in the Netherlands of both performing for the occupying Nazis and as a resistance supporter in the TV documentary series The World at War (Episode: Occupation: Holland 1940–1944).

In 2008, his song "Rhythm for You" was included in the video game Fallout 3.
