= Alexandrov Ensemble =

Russian army choir

A. V. Alexandrov Academic Song and Dance Ensemble of the Russian Army Ансамбль песни и пляски Российской армии имени А. В. Александрова
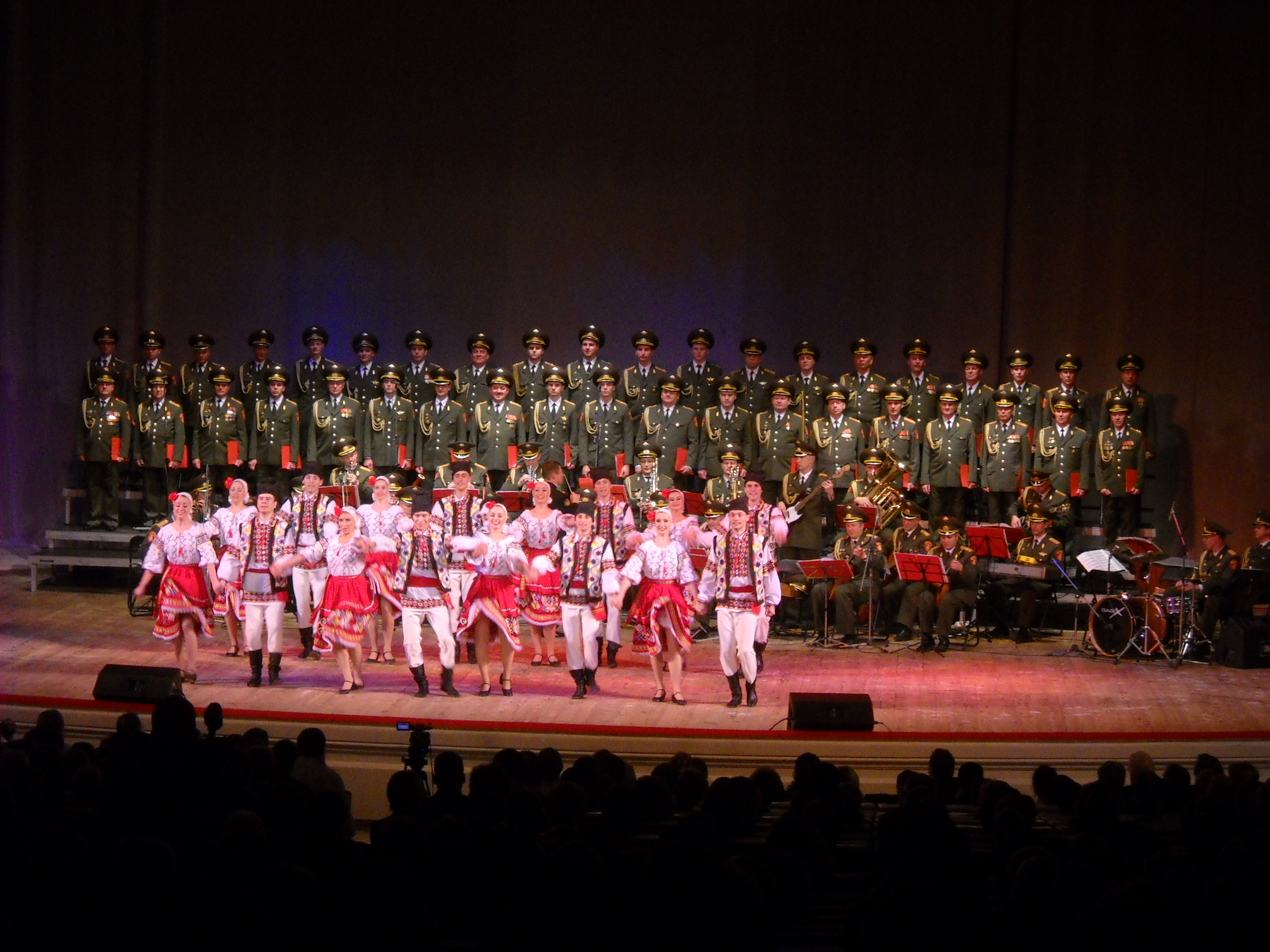
- The Alexandrov Choir with Dance Ensemble, Warsaw 2009

Background information
- Also known as: Alexandrov Ensemble; Red Army Choir; Red Army Song Ensemble of the M. V. Frunze Red Army Central House; Red-Bannered Red Army Song and Dance Ensemble of the USSR; A. V. Alexandrov Twice Red-bannered and Red-starred Song and Dance Ensemble of the Soviet Army; A. V. Alexandrov Twice Red-bannered and Red-starred Academic Song and Dance Ensemble of the Soviet Army
- Genres: Classical; folk tunes; hymns; operatic arias; popular music
- Years active: 1928–present
- Members: Conductor Gennadiy Sachenyuk
- Past members: Valery Khalilov
- Website: redarmychorus.mil.ru

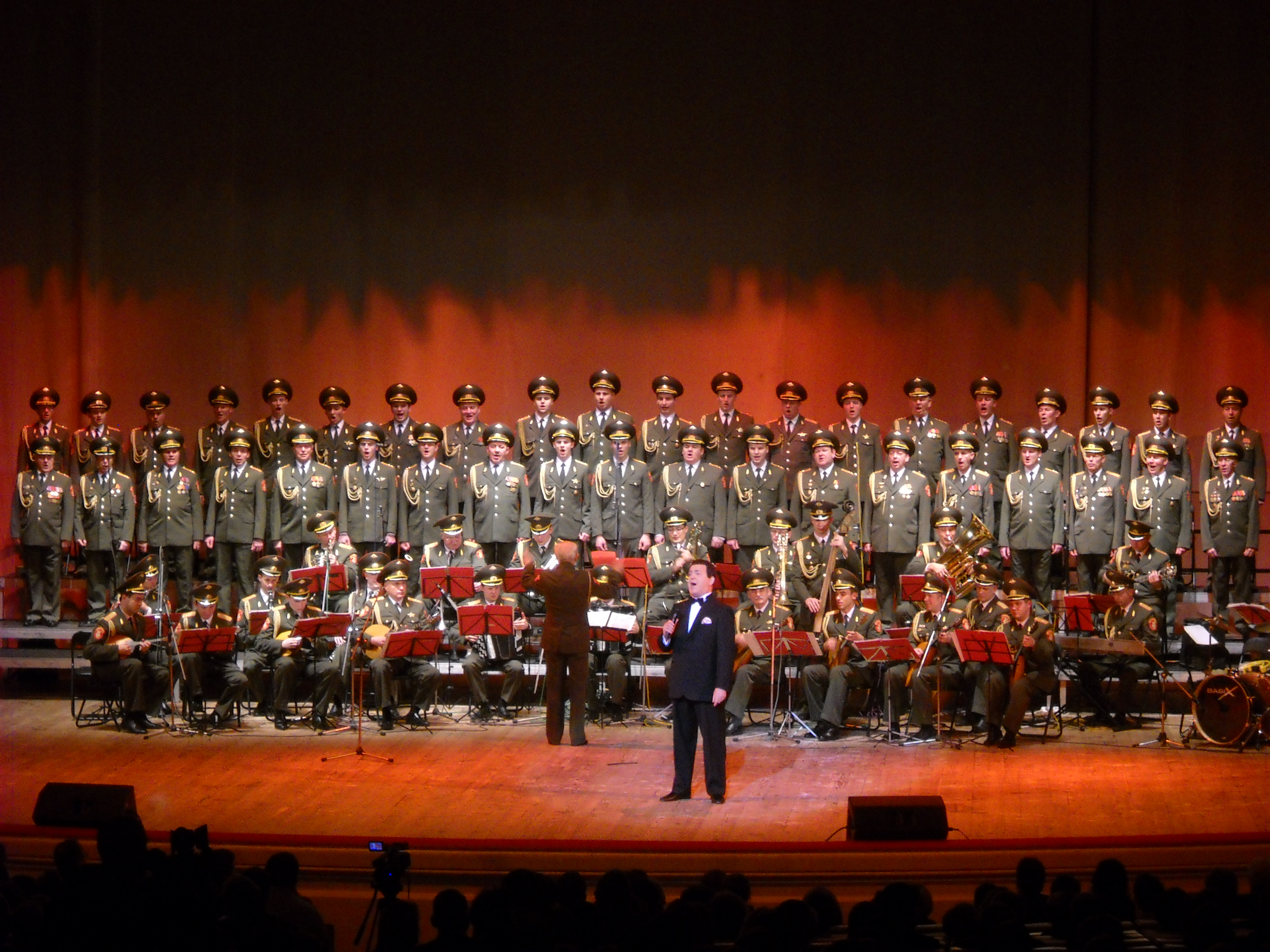
The Alexandrov Ensemble with Joseph Kobzon as soloist

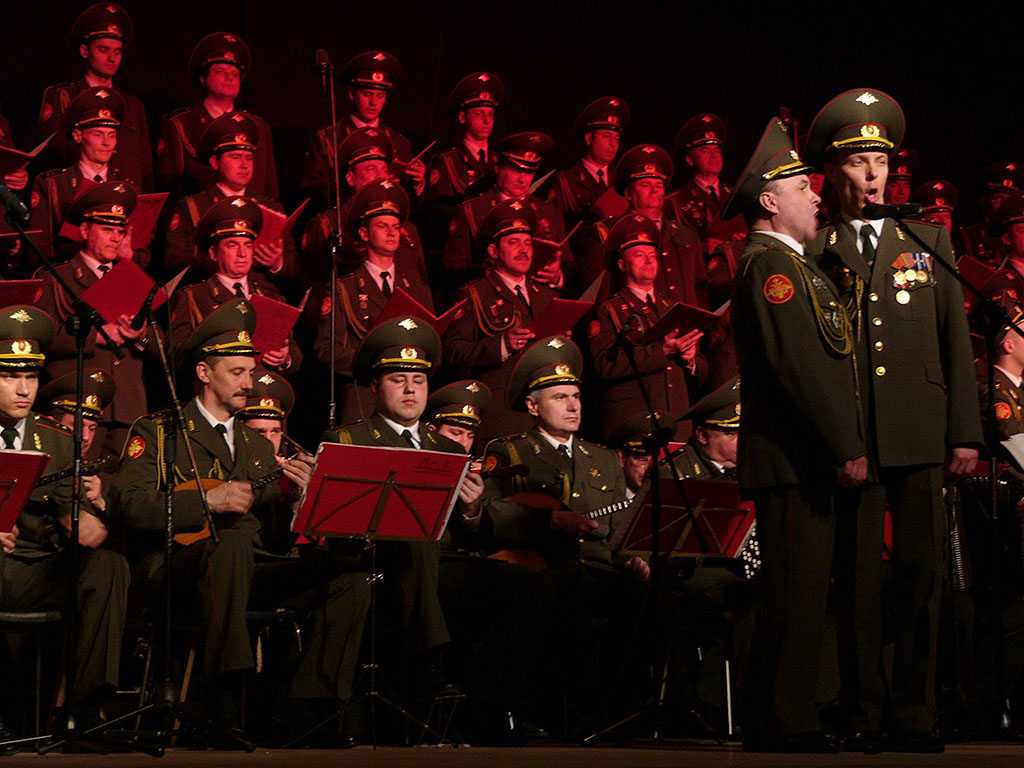
The Alexandrov Ensemble, Bielsko-Biala, 2006. Victor Sanin on the left, Dmitry Bykov on the right (soloists)

The Alexandrov Ensemble (Russian: Ансамбль Александрова, romanized: Ansambl' Aleksandrova), commonly known as the Red Army Choir in the West, is an official army choir of the Russian armed forces. Founded during the Soviet era, the ensemble consists of a male choir, an orchestra, and a dance ensemble.

The Ensemble has entertained audiences both in Russia and throughout the world, performing a range of music including folk tunes, hymns, operatic arias and popular music. The group's repertoire has included The Volga Boatmen's Song, Katyusha, Kalinka, and Ave Maria.

It is named for its first director, Alexander Vasilyevich Alexandrov (1883–1946). Its formal name since 1998 has been A. V. Alexandrov Academic Song and Dance Ensemble of the Russian Army (Russian: Академи́ческий анса́мбль пе́сни и пля́ски Росси́йской А́рмии и́мени А. В. Алекса́ндрова, romanized: Akademíchesky ansámbl′ pésni i plyáski Rossýskoy Ármii ímeni A. V. Aleksándrova), shortened to Academic Ensemble (Russian: Академи́ческий анса́мбль, romanized: Akademíchesky ansámbl′) on second reference.

On 25 December 2016, its artistic director, Valery Khalilov, and 63 other members of the Ensemble were killed in the Russian Defence Ministry aircraft crash of a 1983 Tupolev Tu-154 into the Black Sea just after takeoff from the southern resort city of Sochi, Russia. The Red Army Choir singers and dancers were en route to Syria to entertain Russian troops there for Orthodox Christmas celebrations.

== Name ==
At the establishment, in 1928, the choir was named Red Army Song Ensemble of the M. V. Frunze Red Army Central House (Russian: Анса́мбль красноарме́йской пе́сни Центра́льного до́ма Кра́сной А́рмии и́мени М. В. Фру́нзе, romanized: Ansámbl′ krasnoarméyskoy pésni Tsentrál′nogo dóma Krásnoy Ármii ímeni M. V. Frúnze). In 1935, it was renamed Red-Bannered Red Army Song and Dance Ensemble of the USSR (Russian: Краснознамённый анса́мбль красноарме́йской пе́сни и пля́ски СССР, romanized: Krasnozamyónny ansámbl′ krasnoarméyskoy pésni i plyáski SSSR).

In 1949 the ensemble was officially named the A. V. Alexandrov Twice Red-bannered and Red-starred Song and Dance Ensemble of the Soviet Army (Дважды Краснознамённый ордена Красной Звезды ансамбль песни и пляски Советской Армии имени А. В. Александрова Russian: Два́жды Краснознамённый о́рдена Кра́сной Звезды́ анса́мбль пе́сни и пля́ски Сове́тской А́рмии и́мени А. В. Алекса́ндрова, romanized: Dvázhdy Krasnoznamyonny órdena Krásnoy Zvezdý ansámbl′ pésni i plyáski Sovétskoy Ármii ímeni A. V. Aleksándrova). In 1978 the word "academic" was added to the title (A. V. Alexandrov Twice Red-bannered and Red-starred Academic Song and Dance Ensemble of the Soviet Army). After the dissolution of the Soviet Union, the ensemble received its present name in 1998. It is commonly known as the Red Army Choir in the West.

== History ==
=== Early years ===
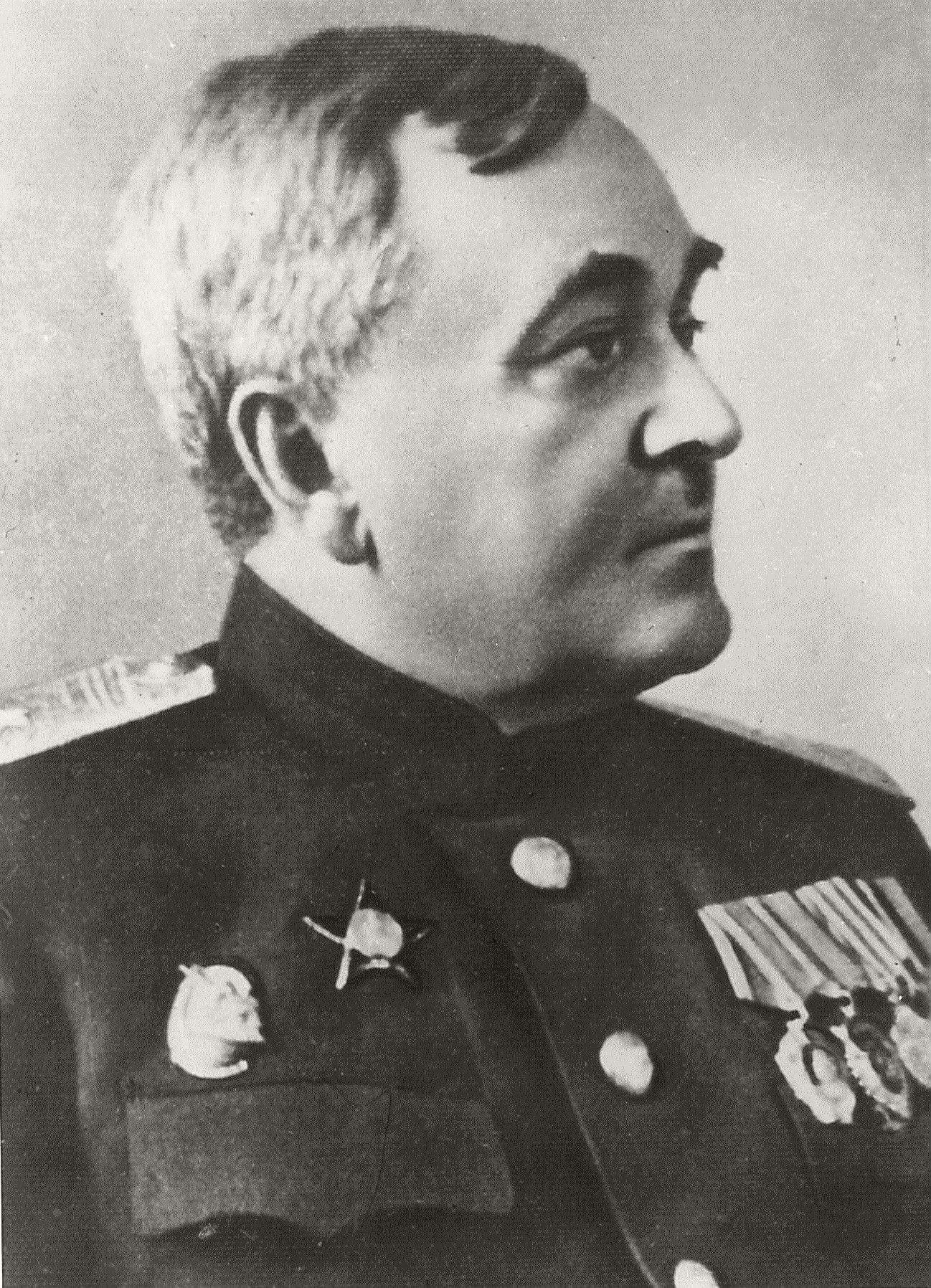
Alexander Alexandrov

Born into a peasant family, Alexander Vasilyevich Alexandrov became the first artistic director of the ensemble, choirmaster, conductor, teacher and the public figure who wrote the music to the State Anthem of the Soviet Union. He came from a musical background of hymns and folk songs, could play the viola and had perfect pitch, so he sang in the church choir and performed at festivals. He was heard singing at the village school by PA Zalivuhin, a soloist in the choir at Kazan Cathedral, St. Petersburg. Zalivuhin persuaded Alexandrov's parents to let the child go to Saint Petersburg to learn music. In 1898, the young peasant boy became a pupil of the Saint Petersburg Court Chapel.

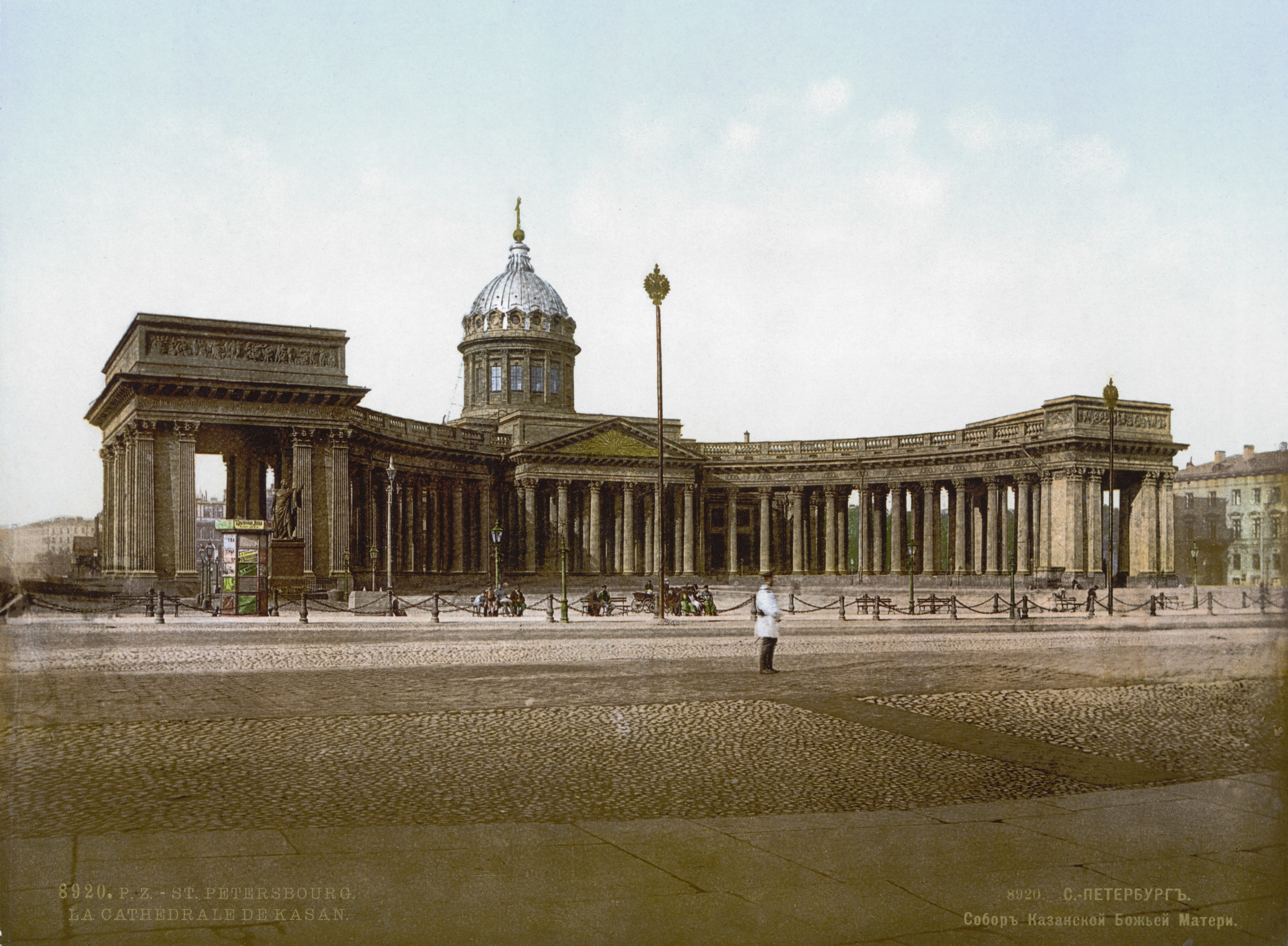
Kazan Cathedral, St. Petersburg, where it all started. Here A.V. Alexandrov, who would one day create the ensemble, began to learn his trade.

There are two recorded histories of the ensemble: possibly separate elements of the same history. The first says that the initiator of the ensemble was Felix Nikolaevich Danilovich, a theatre director. The first director of the ensemble was chosen from three of Moscow's conductors: Danilin, Chesnokov and Alexandrov. Seen in isolation this would signify that A. V. Alexandrov was not the creator of the ensemble. In this version the first troupe is named as follows. Singers: Tkachenko, Zyukov, Samarin, Rozanov, Koltypin, Tolskov, Golyaev, Charov. Dancers: Maximov, Svetlov. Bayanist: Surdin.

The second version says that the ensemble was formed out of the Frunze Red Army Central House in 1928. There is also a story that Stalin then asked Alexandrov to relocate the choir to Moscow.

==== Development ====
During World War II, the ensemble gave over 1500 performances at both Soviet fronts, entertaining troops about to go into battle, at gun emplacements, airfields, and in hospitals.

=== Under Boris Alexandrovich Alexandrov ===
Following the death of Alexander Alexandrov, the ensemble was taken over by his son, Boris Alexandrovich Alexandrov. Under his leadership, the ensemble gained fame outside the Soviet Union, making extensive tours worldwide. Boris Alexandrov retired in 1987, and was succeeded by People's Artist of Russia Igor Agafonnikov the same year, with Anatoly Maltsev as the ensemble chief. He retired as the principal conductor in 1994; he died that year and was buried in Moscow at the Novodevichy Cemetery.

Under B. A. Alexandrov, the ensemble was highly disciplined. Boris's party trick was to leave the stage and allow the ensemble to perform "En Route" alone. Members were positioned so that they could not all watch one orchestral leader, and this appeared to be a trick, but there was no trick at all. Leonid Kharitonov remembers:

The Ensemble members were so disciplined and experienced that they could feel the rhythm simultaneously and could sing and play together automatically, without the conductor... In Canada during one concert Alexandrov left the Ensemble to perform alone for half an hour.

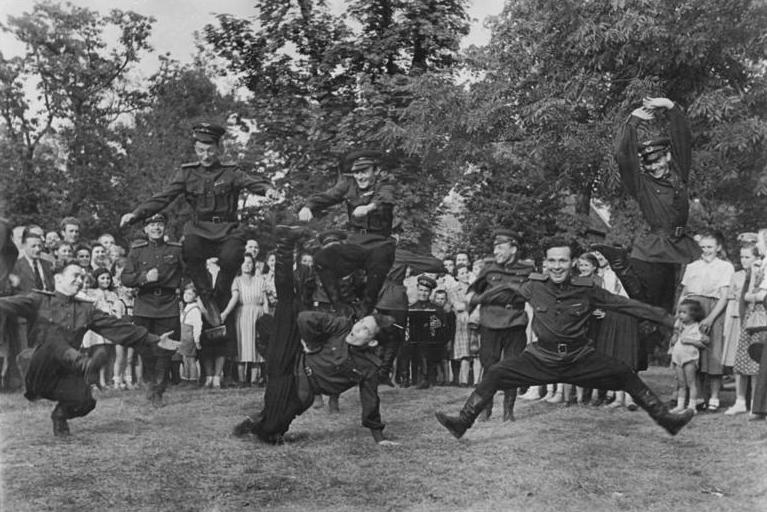
Alexandrov ensemble dancers, Budapest, 1951

Major Vladimir Alexandrov (1910–1978), brother of Boris Alexandrov, also composed for the ensemble. He served as Orchestral Director and Conductor. Vladimir Gordeev was the principal conductor on the 1988 UK tour.

==== 1948 Berlin Peace Concert ====
1948 peace concert at Berlin. Photo taken by member of choir from stage, probably using Boris Alexandrov's camera. Boris Alexandrov has posed for this, holding baton still.

In 1948 much of Berlin was still ruined after World War II, and the city was divided into four occupation zones, controlled by the USSR, France, the UK and the United States. This was before the Berlin Wall was built, and it was still possible to travel between zones. An American officer suggested a concert in the Gendarmenmarkt (in the Soviet zone at the time), and the French zone commander supported the suggestion. The musicians were to be provided by the USSR, and the Alexandrov Ensemble was chosen. A temporary stage was set up in the square, with flowers all along the front. 30,000 people came to stand and watch for three hours. In 1994, towards the end of his life, Boris Alexandrov said:

"The visit to Germany was unforgettable. It is dominant in the history of the ensemble. It was necessary to make a new creative leap – from wartime military music to postwar relaxing harmony. It was important, and the transition had to be managed on many fronts, including getting the Ensemble back into its original pre-war role, performing the classics and singing folk songs. Before the war the Ensemble had 200 professional singers; following the war it was down to 60."

A previous tour to East Germany had been cancelled due to the sudden death of Alexander Alexandrov in 1946 in Potsdam, when in his bed was found an annotated copy of Beethoven's Symphony No. 9, showing that A. Alexandrov had been preparing the final chorus for a performance. Now Boris, his son, was ready to follow his father's plan. The 1948 peace concert was to consist of German opera extracts and Russian folk songs (Nightingales, Zemlyanka and Roads); and after an intervention by the tenor Victor Nikitin, some German folk songs were also included. The people joined in, singing Heidenröslein, and Nikitin sang Kalinka three times in a row. The concert was very successful, and very moving. A sound recording of the concert was made, and pressed in 1985 under the Radio DDR 1 label. This is listed on the Alexandrov Ensemble discography page.

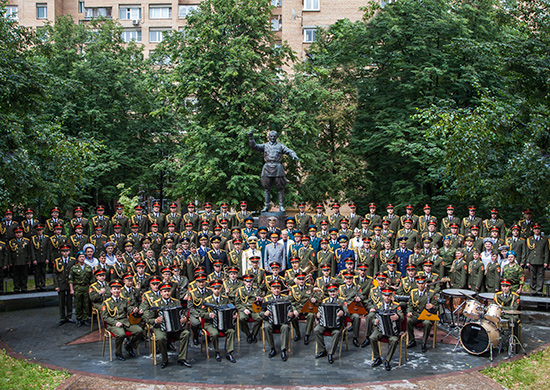
Alexandrov Ensemble during performance

However the Berlin Peace Concert did not happen in isolation. It was part of a series of punishing yearly tours to war-torn areas. The main tour season during and just after World War II appears to have run from June to October – perhaps because the large troupe usually had to perform outdoors, to accommodate large audiences. The August 1948 Berlin concert occurred two-thirds of the way through a tour to (20 June to 18 July) Prague, Most, Brno, Bratislava, Ostrava, Žilina and Košice in Czechoslovakia; then apparently without a break (18 July to 10 October) Dresden, Weimar, Magdeburg, Stendal, Schwerin, Potsdam, Berlin, Rathenow, Leipzig, Halle, Lane, Erfurt, Chemnitz, Frankfurt an der Oder and Schwarzenberg in Germany.

=== After 1991 ===
Since 2003 the ensemble is led by Honoured Artist of Russia Vyacheslav Korobko.

==== Eurovision Song Contest 2009 ====
The choir were the interval act in the first semi-final of Eurovision Song Contest 2009 in Moscow, alongside t.A.T.u who performed "Not Gonna Get Us".

==== 2016 plane crash ====
On 25 December 2016, a Russian Defence Ministry Tupolev Tu-154 carrying 64 members of the Alexandrov Ensemble Choir went down 1.5 km (0.93 mi) off the coast of Sochi, Russia while en route to Latakia, Syria, for a Christmas celebration with the troops deployed at Khmeimim military base. The plane crashed with no survivors. Of the 92 passengers and crew on board, 64 were members of the Alexandrov Ensemble.

After 5 weeks, the choir was reformed anew in time for Defender of the Fatherland Day celebrations on 18 February 2017. That first concert in weeks marks also the birth of a new era for the Ensemble, with its first international tour following the crash with concerts not just in Russia but also in select European countries. Most of the new members joined through auditions held on 15 and 27 January 2017 by the Ministry of Defense of Russia. Since 7 June 2016, Colonel Gennadiy Sachenyuk became artistic director then main conductor and Head of the Ensemble since 24 March 2017.

==== 2018 90th Anniversary ====
On 12 October 2018, the Ensemble celebrated the 90th anniversary of its foundation at a special event at the Bolshoi Theatre. Following this event, the leader of the Ensemble Colonel Gennadiy Sachenyuk announced a worldwide tour. The Ensemble performed concerts produced by Thierry Wolf in various countries including France, Switzerland, Belgium, Serbia, the Czech Republic and China. In December 2019, they celebrated Christmas in Montreal during a week of seven concerts at La Maison Symphonique.

==== 2022 Russian invasion of Ukraine ====
Following the Russian invasion of Ukraine on 24 February 2022, the Ensemble's planned tour of the Czech Republic was canceled, while individual members of the choir have faced disqualifications from competitions such as Operalia.

== Composition ==
=== Soloists ===
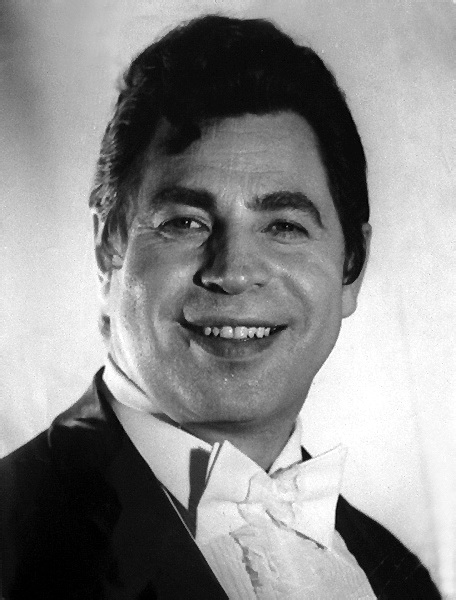
Leonid Kharitonov

Most notable soloists:

- Evgeny Belyaev
- Victor Ivanovich Nikitin
- Leonid Kharitonov
- Mark Reizen
- Georgi Pavlovich Vinogradov
- Vadim Ananyev
- Ivan Bukreev
- V. Chetverikov

=== Chorus ===
Current members of the choir are listed here. The choir, traditionally, consists mainly of vocal sections of tenor, baritone, and bass choristers, until the inclusion of the first women's choir members in the 2020s. In some of the pieces they perform, these sections are divided into as many as eight different vocal lines. From the early 1950s until at least 1965 a typical full division (which varied from song to song) was as follows: (1) countertenors; (2) first tenors; (3) second tenors; (4) baritones; (5) first bass; (6) second bass; (7) basso profundos.

=== Orchestra ===
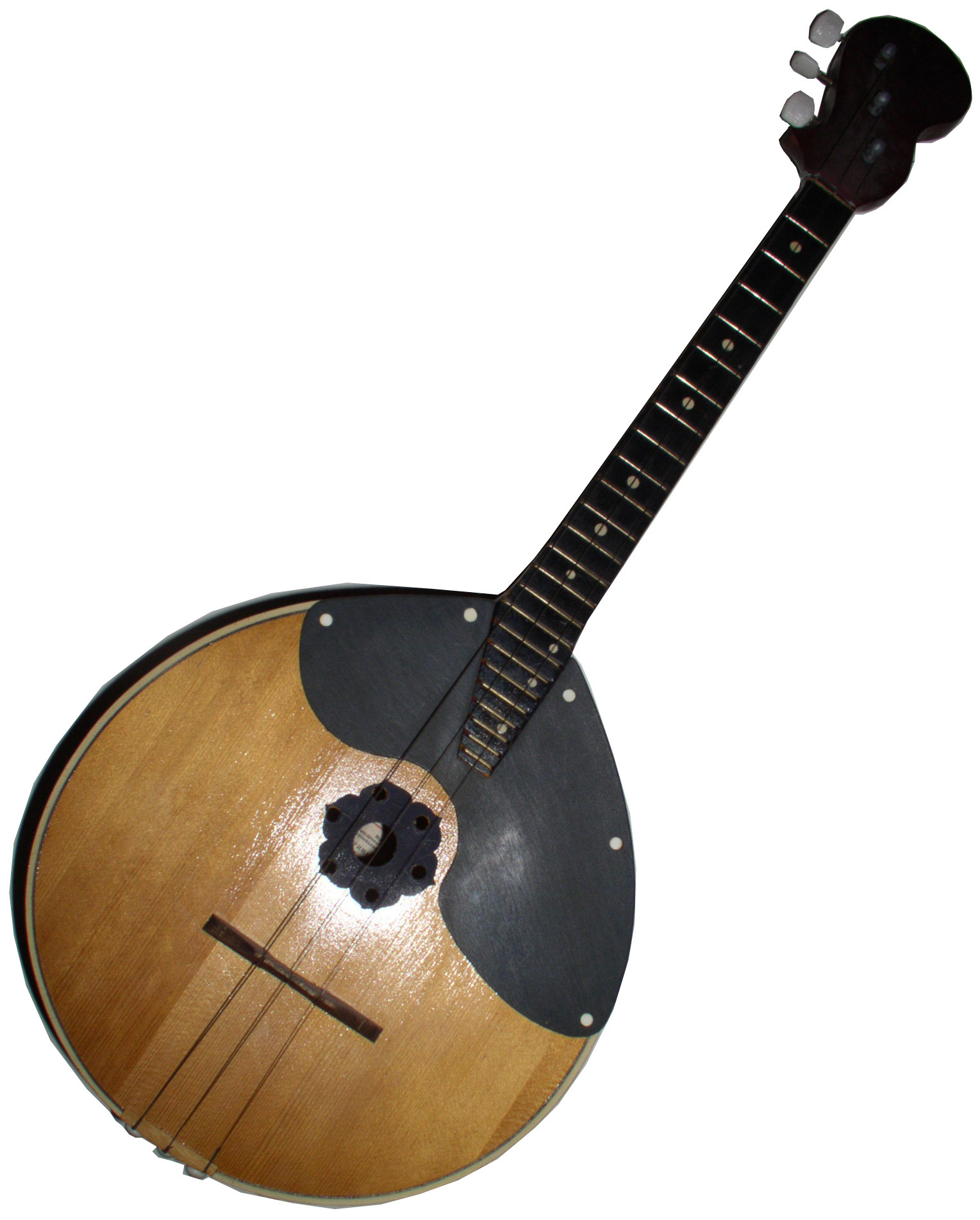
A Russian Domra

The orchestra, in what became a typical composition for later generations of military ensembles in the Soviet Union, has a mixed composition of Russian traditional instruments and western instruments, including the balalaika, the domra, the bayan, the double bass, woodwinds, brass, and percussion instruments. A great guest balalaika player was Boris Stepanovich Feoktistov (Борис Степанович Феоктистов) (1910–1988). In the West his most famous recording is Kamarinskaya (1963). A. Molostov is the trumpet soloist in "Dark Eyes" in vintage recordings. The bayan-player Victor Gridin is a past member of the orchestra.

=== Dancers ===
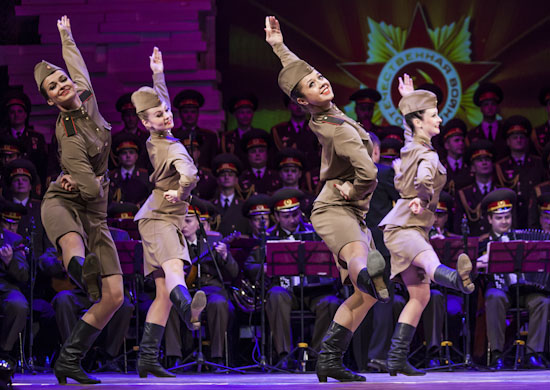
Alexandrov Ensemble dancers

Among the dances staged by the ensemble are Zaparozhtsi Dance, Cossack's Cavalry Dance, Festive March, Dance of the Cossacks, Soldier's Dance, and Sailor's Dance. Some of these are performed by mixed dancers, while others, such as Cossack's Cavalry Dance, are performed by male dancers only.

The ballet is under the direction of Lev Nikolaevich Kulikov National Artist of Russia, the main ballet master, and maintains the heights of choreographic art with honour. The priority in its repertoire is taken by the military compositions: Matroskaya barynya, Kazachiya cavalry plyaska, Festive march, Invitation to dance and others. The ballet performs a lot of Russian folk dances. The classical repertoire contains Poloveckie plyasky from the opera Prince Igor written by Alexander Borodin. This is from our dance classics, but we always update the dance repertoire. (Leonid Ivanovich Malev, current Director of the Ensemble, interviewed by Russia Beyond the Headlines 1 Dec 2008)

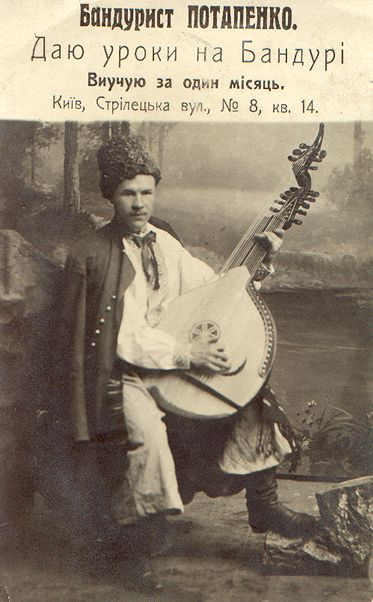
The song Bandura, a duet recorded with soloists I. Savchuk and V. Fedorov, refers to this instrument (photo ca.1925)

=== Current line-up ===
The artistic director was Valery Khalilov but he, and 63 other members of the Ensemble, were killed in an aircraft crash on 25 December 2016. The chief choreographer is People's Artist of Russia L. Kulikov; the chief administrator is Honoured Artist of Russia VG Kadin, the choreographer and coach is the Honoured Artist of Russia V. Ermolin; head dresser is Honoured Worker of Culture A. Kormilitsyn; soloists are VI Shtefutsa and EM Labkovsky; with SV Ivanov, PD Bogachev, VP Maystruk, AA Gvozdetsky, BM Mizyuk: all Honoured Artist of Russia.

In the choir are YA Lysenko, Y. Shtrunov, IM Pirogov, IS Sobolev, IF Volkov, OV Filimonov, AN Savitsky, VA Nagorny, VP Kokarev, AA Hristachev, JN Deynekin, VM Bolonenko, VN Antonov, AN Stritenko, AA Toschev: all Honoured Artist of Russia; and VS Buzlov, SP Lapik, VF Orthodox, GU Razgasimov, V. Chekin, MD Mochalina.

In the orchestra are AA Mogulkin, Y. Savkin, MG Chervov, PD Shchennikov, NI Diakov, AI Egorov, VM Predelin: all Honoured Artist of Russia. Vocal coaches are People's Artist of Russia, laureate of competitions, MI Glinka and PI Tchaikovsky, Professor KP Lisovsky. The Principal Concertmaster is Honoured Artist of Russia V. Brodsky.

In the ballet are GD Pavlyuchenko, IV Konygina, P.U. Khmelnitski: all Honoured Artist of Russia. In 2019, the Ensemble touring all over the world with famous soloist as Valery Gavva or Vadim Ananeev but also young soloists such as Alexander Kruze or Maxim Maklakov, former soloit of Kraznodar Opera or very young talent such as Sergey Kuznetsov. Under the direction of conductor Gennadiy Sachenyuk

=== Composers and directors ===
==== Directors of the Ensemble and orchestra, and Assistant Conductors ====
- 1928–1946 – Major General Alexander Vasilyevich Alexandrov, People's Artist of the Soviet Union, founding artistic director and conductor of the Ensemble, awarded the Stalin Prize, composed the State Anthem of the Soviet Union and various other songs for the ensemble
- 1946–1987 – Major General Boris Alexandrovich Alexandrov, Hero of Socialist Labor, People's Artist of the Soviet Union, awarded both the Lenin Prize and the Stalin Prize, son of the founder, composer and led the ensemble on a number of national and international engagements
- 1987–1992 – Professor Colonel Anatoly Maltsev, People's Artist of Russia, led the Ensemble through the dissolution of the Soviet Union and the armed forces, served as Assistant Conductor until 1987
- 1992–1993 – Colonel Igor Germanovich Agafonnikov (until 1992 conductor and artistic director for the orchestra, also served as deputy and relief conductor)
- 1993–2002 – Colonel Dmitry Vasilyevich Somov
- 1994–2002 – Colonel Victor A. Fedorov, Choir Master and relief conductor
- 2003–2016 – Colonel Leonid Malev, Honoured Artist and Honoured Cultural Worker, responsible for the choir's renewed international tours including a memorable concert at the Vatican in 2004
- 2008–2012 – Prof. Colonel Igor Raevskiy, People's Artist of Russia, Honoured Artist of Belarus, awarded the State Prize of Czechoslovakia
- 2012–2016, 2017–present – Colonel Gennady Ksenafontovich Sachenyuk, Honoured Cultural Worker of Russia, current artistic director, Principal Conductor and Head of the Ensemble
- 2016 (May–December) – Prof. Lieutenant General Valery Khalilov, People's Artist of Russia, highest-ranking officer to serve as Artistic Director
- Second conductor, Lieutenant Colonel Nikolay Kirillov, People's Artist of Russia, Chief Conductor and assistant director of the ensemble
- Choirmaster- Sergey Sokolov.
- Present days – 13 September 2019, Gennadiy Sachenyuk, nicknamed the Maestro, Conductor and Director of the Ensemble since 2016, was honored with the highest level medal for Russian artist.

==== Composers and assistant directors ====
- Kostiantyn Dankevych (1905–1984): a Ukrainian who was director of Songs and Dance of the Red Army Choir in Tbilisi, and wrote Poem of Ukraine.
- Lev Knipper (1898–1974) who composed Polyushko Pole, and Viktor Gusev (1909–1944) who wrote the lyrics.
- Pavlo Virsky who was artistic director of the Alexandrov Ensemble dancers from 1942, for many years.
- Samuel Pokrass (1897–1939) who wrote White Army, Black Baron or Red Army is Strongest; lyrics by P. Grigoriev.

== The repertoire ==
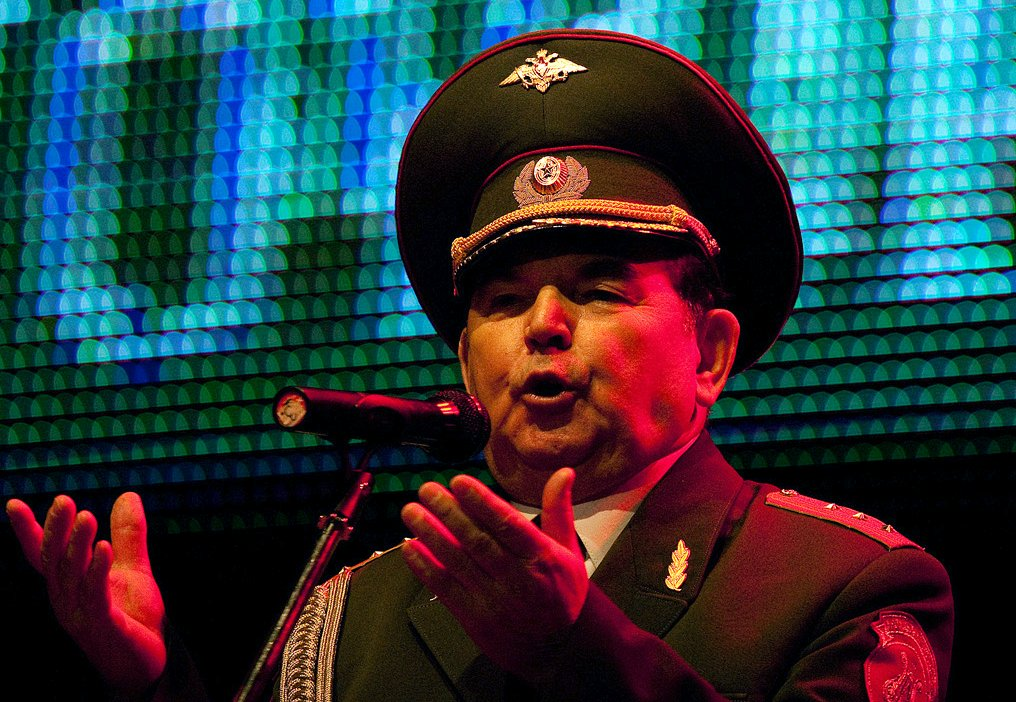
Soloist Vasily Shtefutsa in Prague, 2010

In 2006 and 2007, in Moscow and in Vladikavkaz, Grozny, the ensemble performed a New Year fairy tale show for children, Ivan the Good, Ivan the Brave, about a soldier helping to save New Year's Day.

In 2008, the 80th anniversary of the ensemble, director Leonid Malev said:

Of course everything depends on the repertoire which is quite large – more than two thousand works. Depending on the concert we choose a special repertoire. We have a rule that we try not to break. In any country we sing 2–3 songs in the native language of the people who live there. As a rule it helps to find a rapport with, and the appreciation of, the audience. And for us it is some kind of musical gift, to honour the host country and its people. For instance in Canada when we sang the National Anthem of Russia people stood up to show respect to our country, and when we finished we sang their country's anthem "O Canada".

A million people in our country and abroad like songs like "Kalinka", "Katyusha", "Smuglyanka" and the other songs of the military years as well as "The Day of the Victory", "Dark Eyes", "Vecherny zvon" and "Podmoskovnye vechera". All these songs are known because of the Alexandrov folk song and dance company and people want to hear these songs at every concert. They are not just part of our history; they are great masterpieces. It is interesting that "Svyaschennaya Voyna", written by Alexander Vasilyevich Alexandrov in 1941, helped Soviet soldiers to protect their Motherland and is still popular in Slovakia, Poland and Bulgaria. Those audiences listen to it standing up and it touches their hearts and souls.

For our concerts we search for new musical works because you can't live only in the past. But to tell you the truth it's impossible to imagine our concerts without works of Russian and West-European classical music (Beethoven, Bach, Tchaikovsky and Mussorgsky), they are part of human history. But our repertoire contains not only songs of the military years and folk songs, arias from operas, songs of the world and spiritual music but also new songs such as Iliya Reznik's "To Serve Russia", and those written by Eduard Hanka, Kim Breytburg, Sergey Sashin and other modern composers and poets. —Director Leonid Ivanovich Malev, 1 December 2008

== The Children's Choir School ==
The Alexandrov children's choir school was founded in 2007. Malev said about the school:

It's not a secret that the more you work with children, the greater their prospect of achievement in society. We approached the Ministry of Defence with an appeal to organize this choir and it was approved. October 1st 2007 was the opening day of the Aleksandrovcy creative school for musical and aesthetic education for children. This became an important event in the year of the Ensemble's 80th anniversary.
The first night of the boys' Aleksandrovcy Choir on December 26th at the Cadets' Gold Epaulette Ball went like clockwork. After that night they participated in many concerts. The latest was on Poklonnaya Hill in memory of the Beslan tragedy, as part of City Day on the 3rd and 7th of September. It should be mentioned that we have an excellent director of the school Nina Anatolievna Putilina who puts all her soul into raising this worthy generation. We do a lot in order to raise the new generation with regard to physical, spiritual and moral health. Here children begin at the beginning of vocal music and literary speaking; they absorb the best practice of their teachers. The children's choir has become an integral part of the Ensemble's life and takes part in its important concerts. We plan to have tours together.

== Films ==
The ensemble under the direction of Boris Alexandrov can be heard singing It's a Long Way to Tipperary in the 1981 film Das Boot. Members of the ensemble are seen performing The Internationale in New York's Grand Central Station in Peter Miller's 2000 documentary The Internationale. Several films have been made of the ensemble's performances: see Alexandrov Ensemble discography.

== Awards for the ensemble ==
- For global recognition of high art: The Global Team Award
- From the French Academy of Records, for the best record: Gold Disk (1961)
- From the French company Chant Du Monde, for record sales: Gold disk (1964)
- Order of the Mongolian Combat Merit (1964)
- Czechoslovak Order of the Red Star (1965)
- From the Dutch company N.O.K, for record sales: Gold disk (1974)
- Two awards of the Order of the Red Banner
- The honorary title of academy (1979)

== See also ==
- Alexandrov Ensemble choir
- Alexandrov Ensemble soloists
- Alexandrov Ensemble discography
