= Tarateño Rojas =

Bolivian singer and musician

Rigoberto Rojas Suárez (January 4, 1917 – August 7, 2001), better known as Tarateño Rojas, was a Bolivian singer, musician and composer based in Argentina. He sang and played traditional Andean music and is a symbol of friendship between the Bolivian and Argentine people.

== Biography ==
Rojas was born in Tarata in the department of Cochabamba to a family of musicians. Tarateño Rojas emigrated to Argentina after the Chaco War searching for a better life. There, he took part in the diffusion of andean instruments like the Charango and it was him who started the diffusion of the Trompo music instrument in Argentina in the 1940s. He became part of the group "Pachamama" formed by Mauro Núñez another influential charanguista. Mauro Núñez, Hugo Echave, Tito Veliz, Antonio Pantoja y Mario Rudón were also part of the group.

But he is especially known for having invented the Sucu Sucu Taquirari in 1959 and for having composed the song of the same name : "Sucu sucu" played by dozens of artists over the world. He has performed under several names such as Rosas, Rojas, T.Rojas, and Alberto Rojas more often than his real name. He also had a role in the Spanish movie La cigarra. He died the August 7, 2001 in Buenos Aires after 2 years of disease.

== Discography ==
- Tarateño Rojas - Doble TK EP 54-150 (1959)
- Tarateño Rojas & Wara Wara - Viva Bolivia - Argentina LP
- Tarateño Rojas y su conjunto - Tarateño Rojas - Argentina LP
- Tarateño Rojas - Spain LP (1975)
- Tarateño Rojas - Chants et musique typique incas - French LP (1975)
- Tarateño Rojas - Chants et musique typique incas Vol.1 & 2 - French LP
- Tarateño Rojas - Abecedario Lp (1976)
- Tarateño Rojas - Sucu-Sucu alles tanzt heutʹ - Mambo - German LP
- Tarateño Rojas - El Rey Del Sucu Sucu
- Tarateño Rojas - Sueños
- Tarateño Rojas - Mambo De Machaguay

== Filmography ==
- La cigarra (1948)

== Books ==
- Sucu Sucu : Mambo (1958)
- Step right up and say you love me (1961)

== Prizes ==
- Honour diploma from the Bolivian embassy and the Civil Bolivian Association Federation (1997)
- Gold medal of the national artist R.C.U.N 121/64 from the Universidad Mayor de San Simón
- Honour parchment from the authorities and people of Tarata (1964)
- C.I.C.M.A.T - Centro de Investigaciones en Comunicación Masiva, Arte y Tecnología from the city of Buenos Aires (1975)
- Peña Naira - Appreciation diploma from the Bolivian Folkorists Society (1979)
- Diploma Salon de Arte Tortoni from the Director Juan Carlos Martínez and members of the hall of the city of Ciudad de Buenos Aires (1993)
- Special Mention - Bloque de Consejales Justicialistas del Honorable Consejo Deliberante de la Capital Federal from the “Encuentro de Cultura para la Ciudad de Buenos Aires, Enrique Santos Discepolo” (1989)
- I.N.C.A.M. Honour Diploma from the American Historian, art and archeological cultural Institute (1985)
- "La Casa Del Cantor" diploma from the Directive Commission and the members
