= Farahabad Complex =

Iranian national heritage site

- مجموعه فرح‌آباد
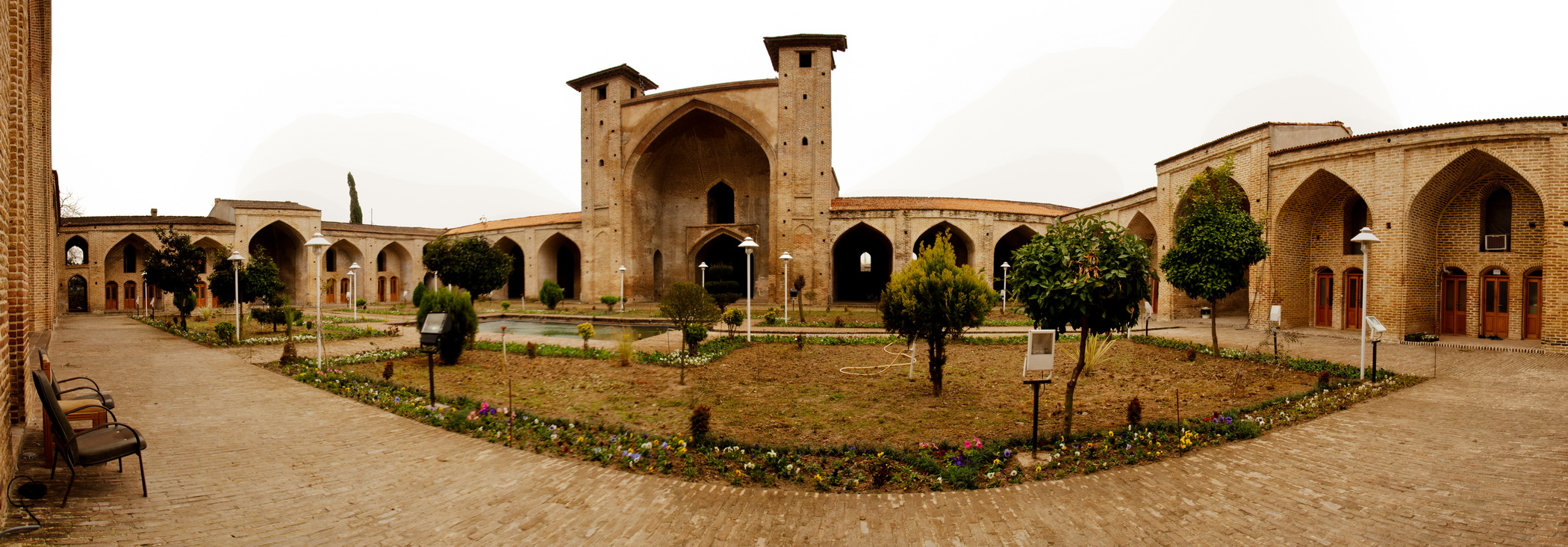
- Farahabad Complex
- Established: Safavid dynasty
- Location: Farahabad, Iran
- Type: Historical Complex

Farahabad Complex is a collection of monuments that relate to the remains of Farahabad Old Town. It was built during the reign of Abbas the Great.

== Residual Buildings ==
Many of the city's monuments have been destroyed throughout history by invasion. Farahabad Mosque, school, part of Shah Abbasi bridge, wall belonging to a palace and baths َAnd Jahan Nama Palace of the Safavid era.

== Gallery ==
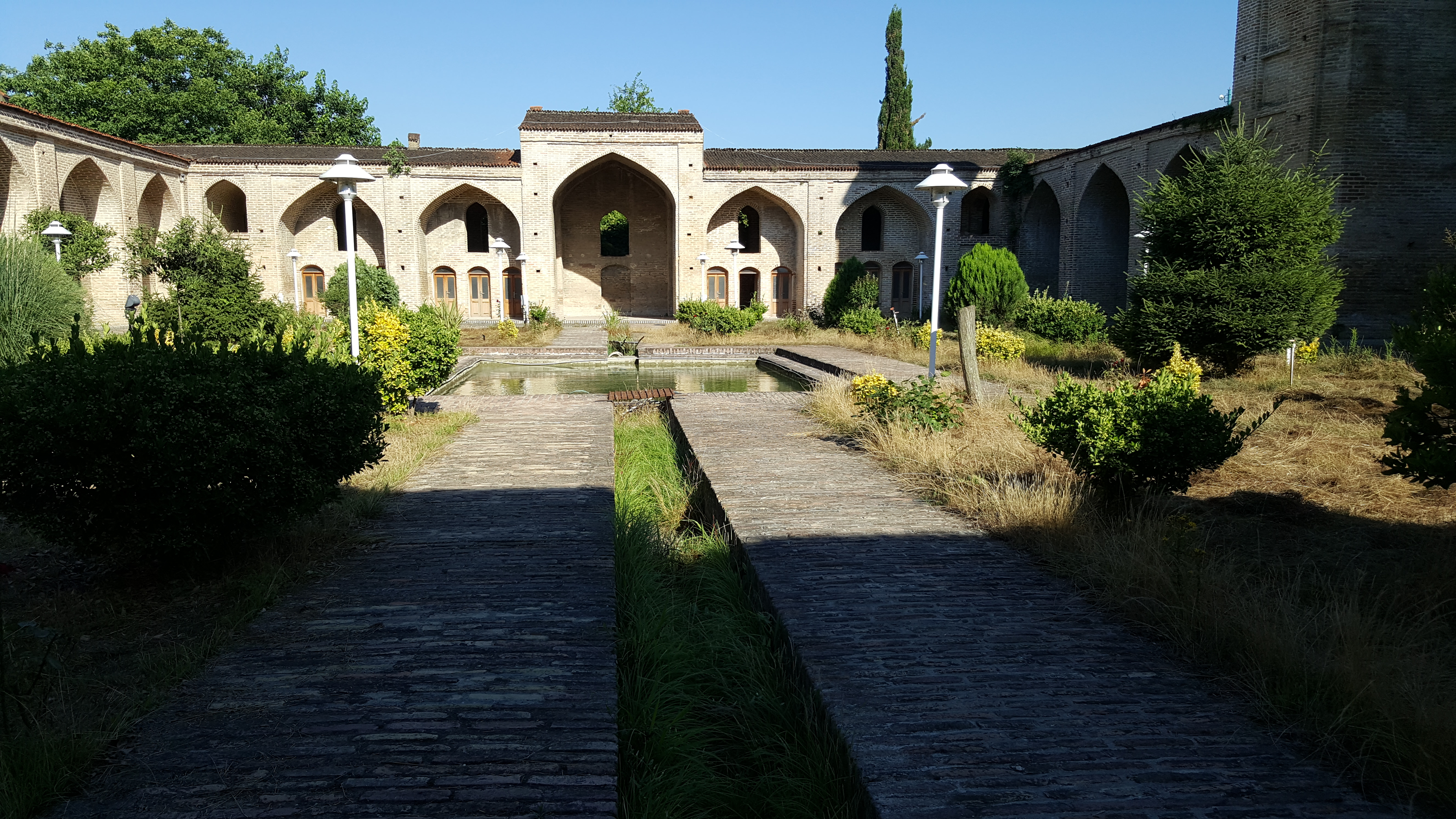

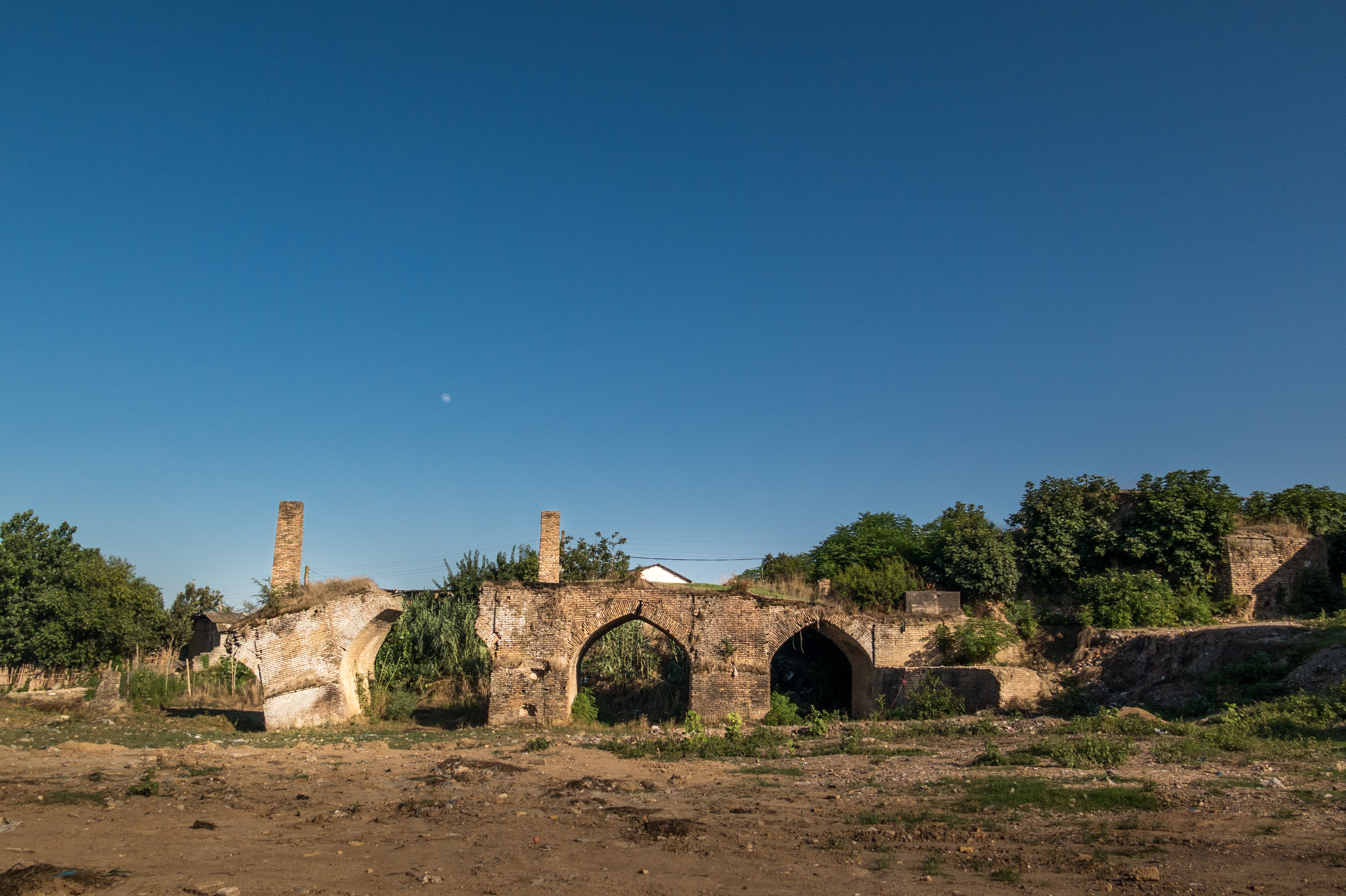

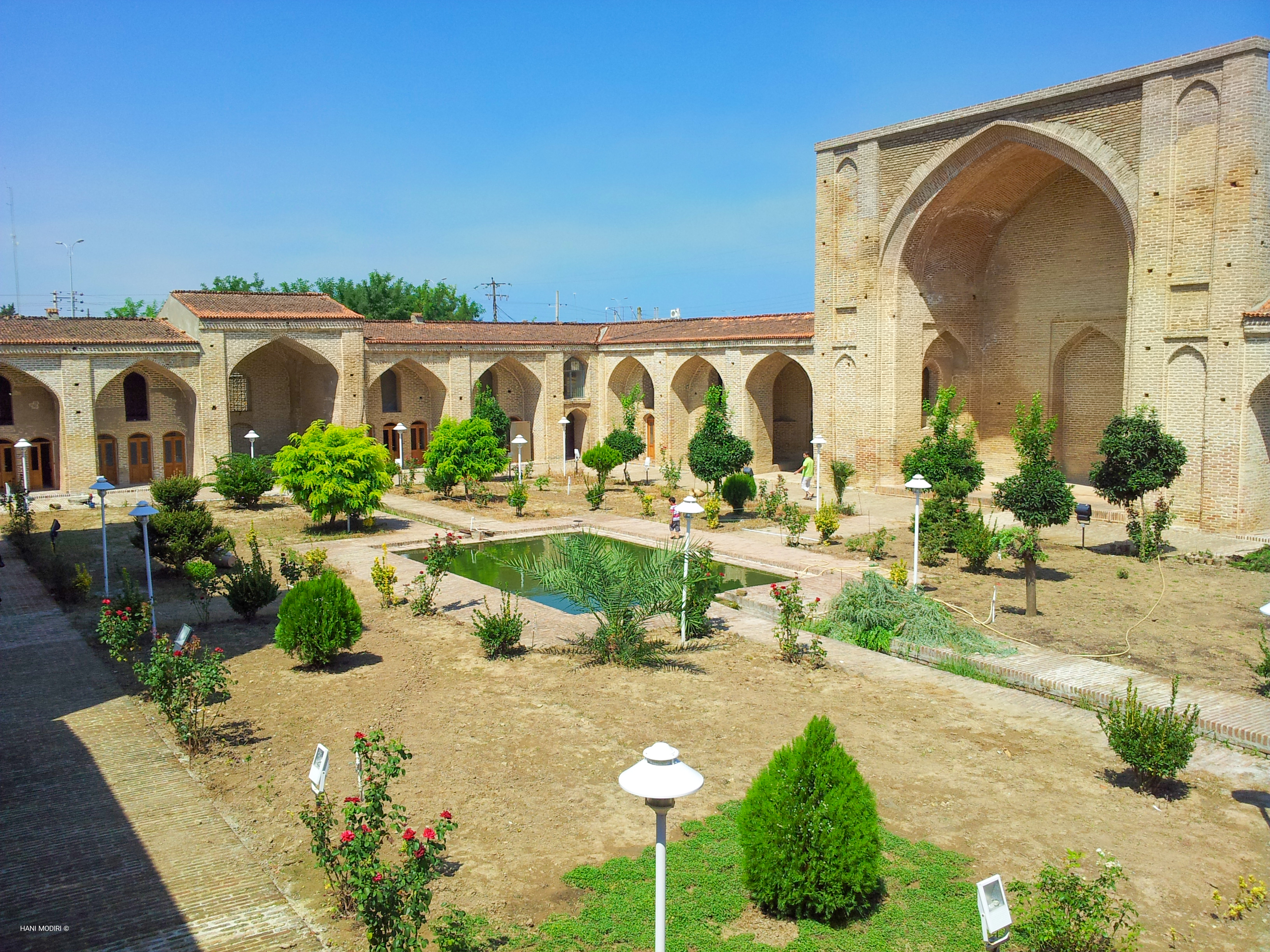

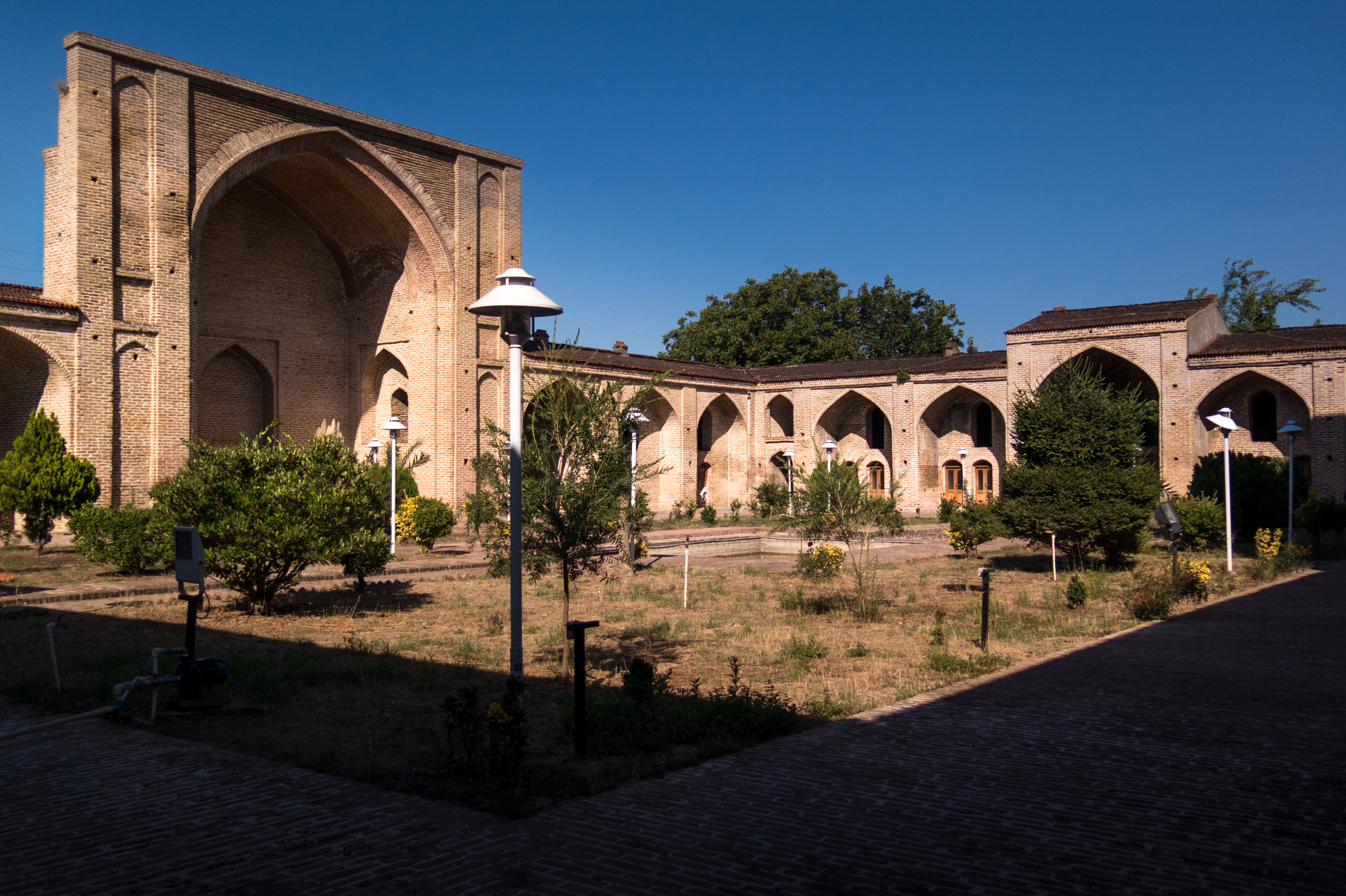

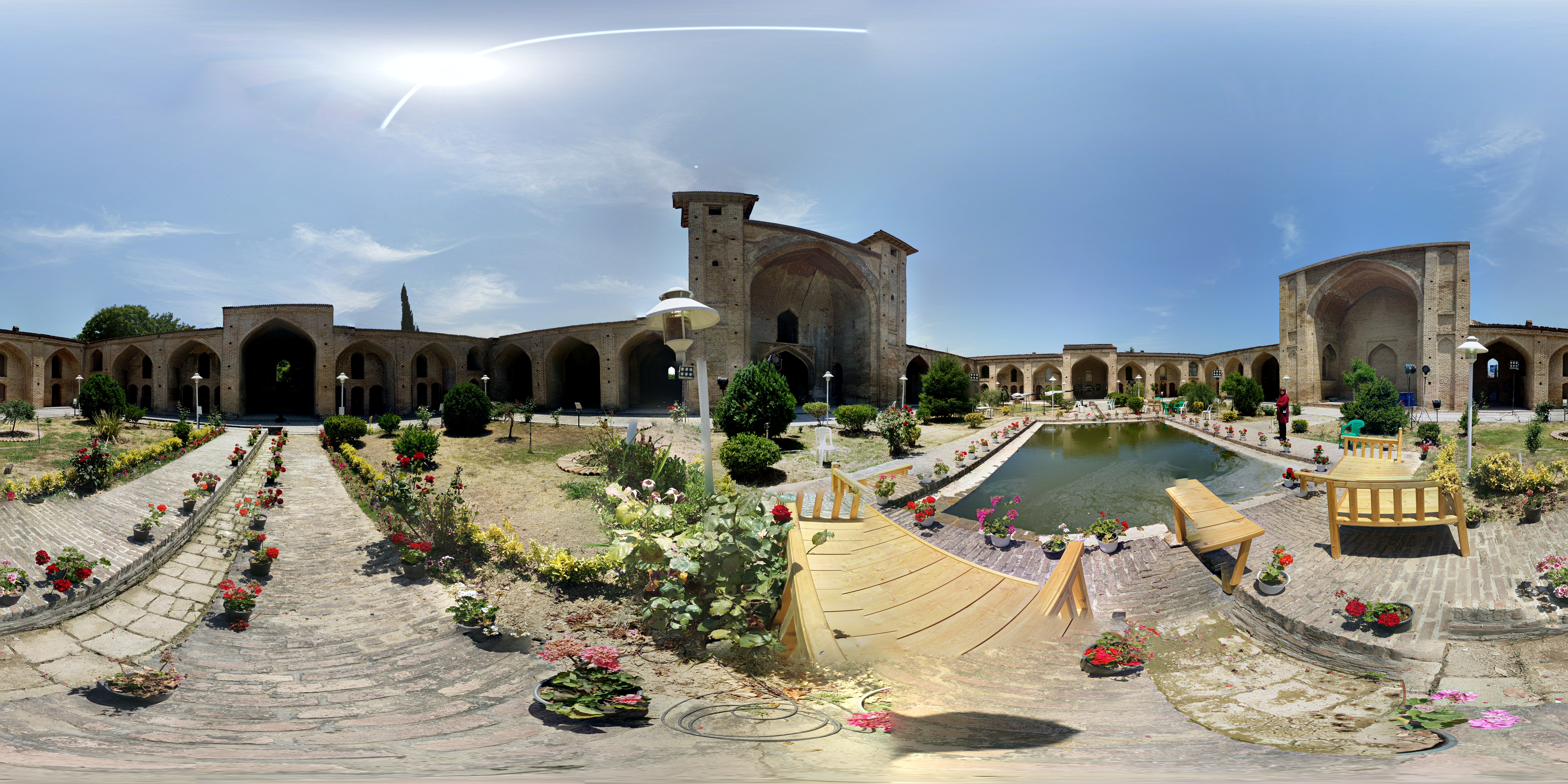

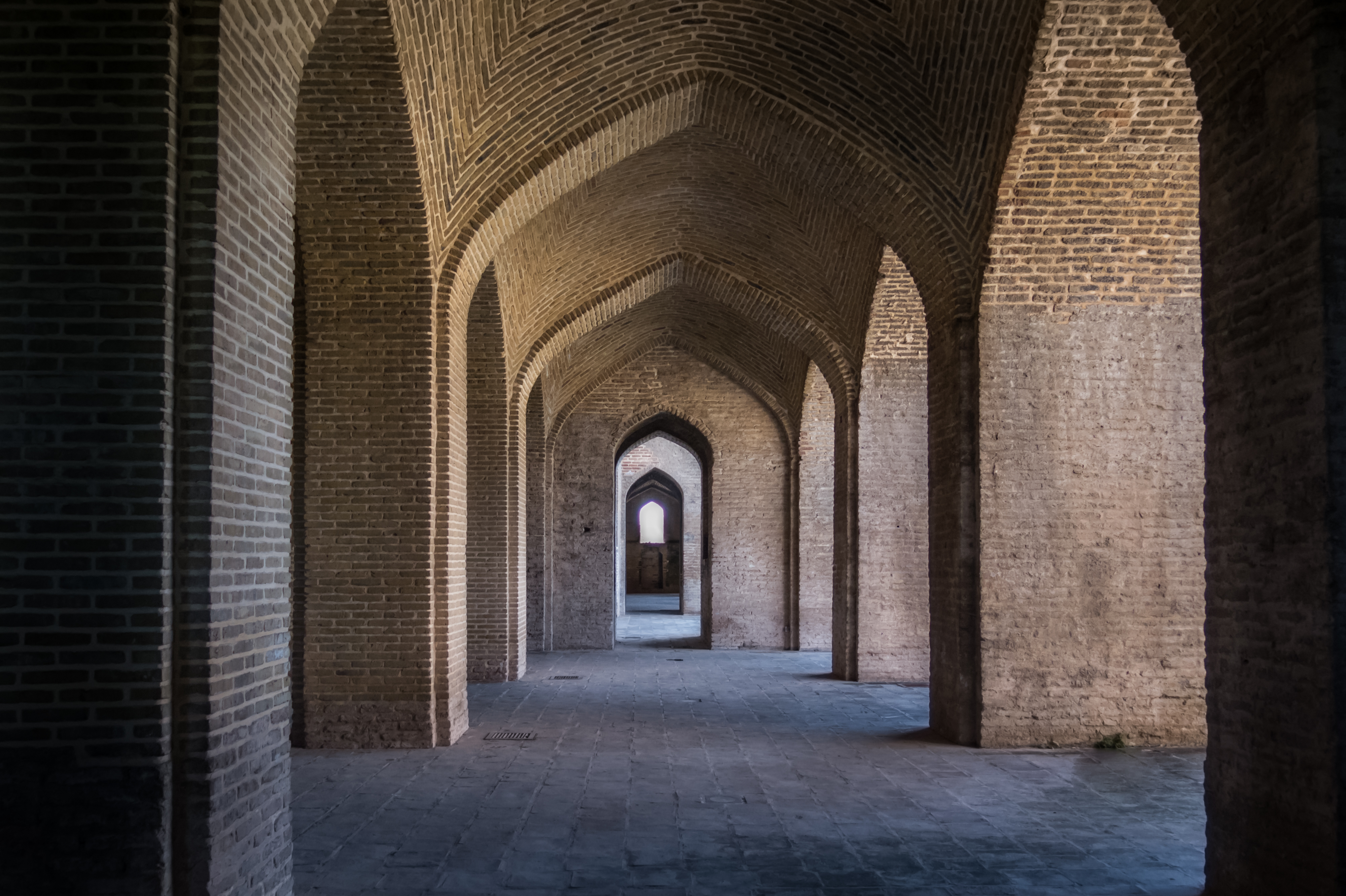

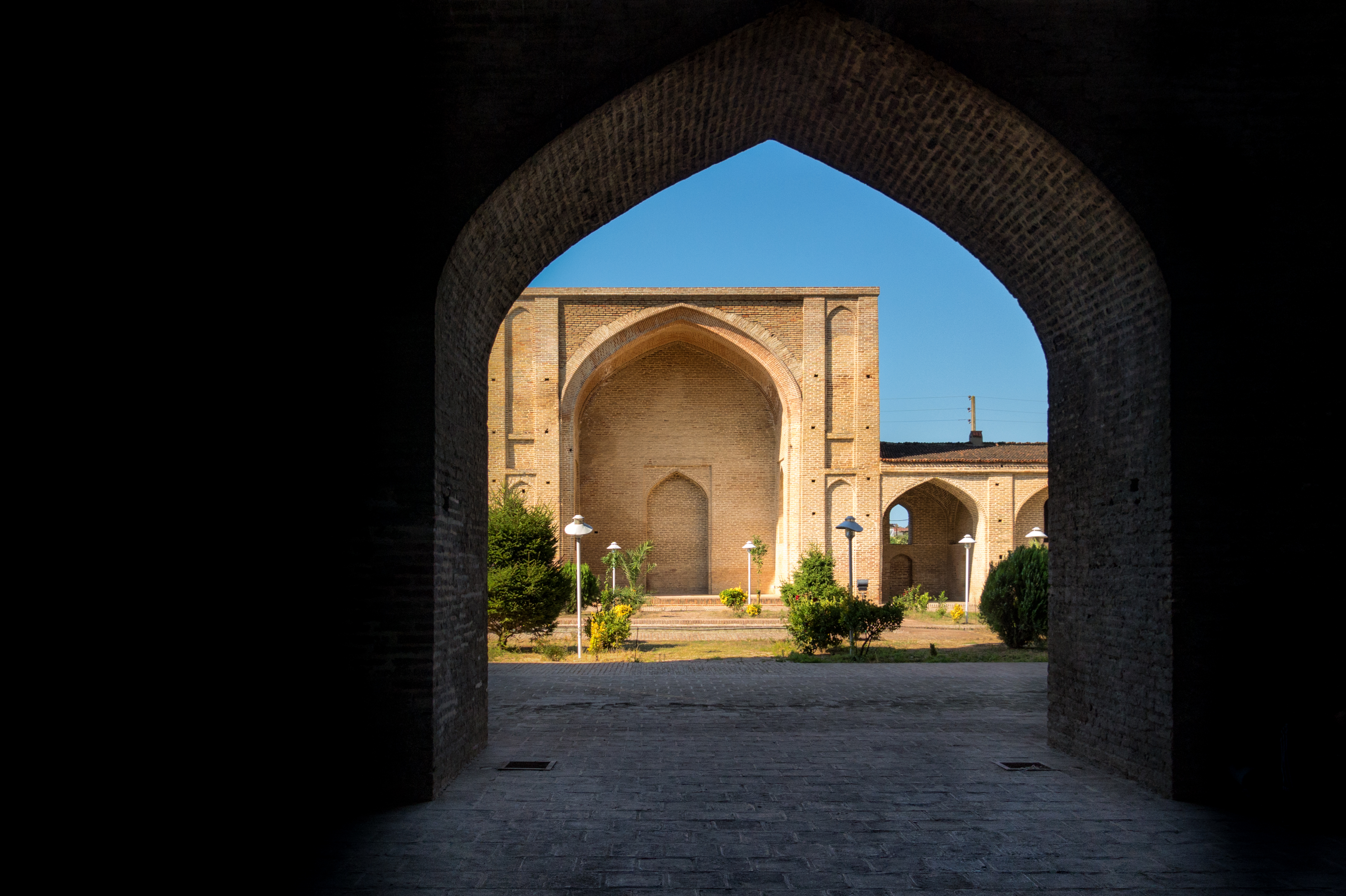

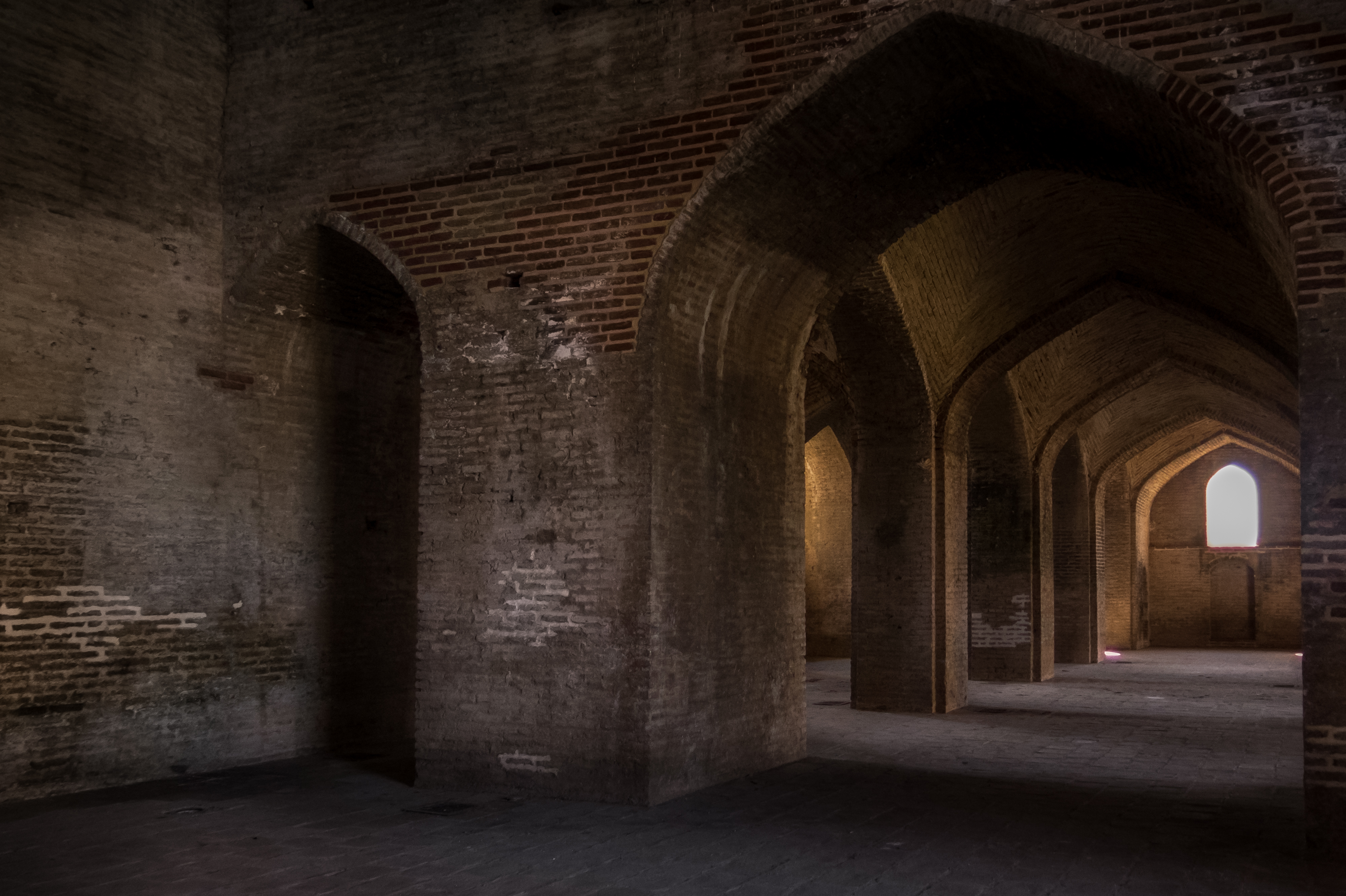

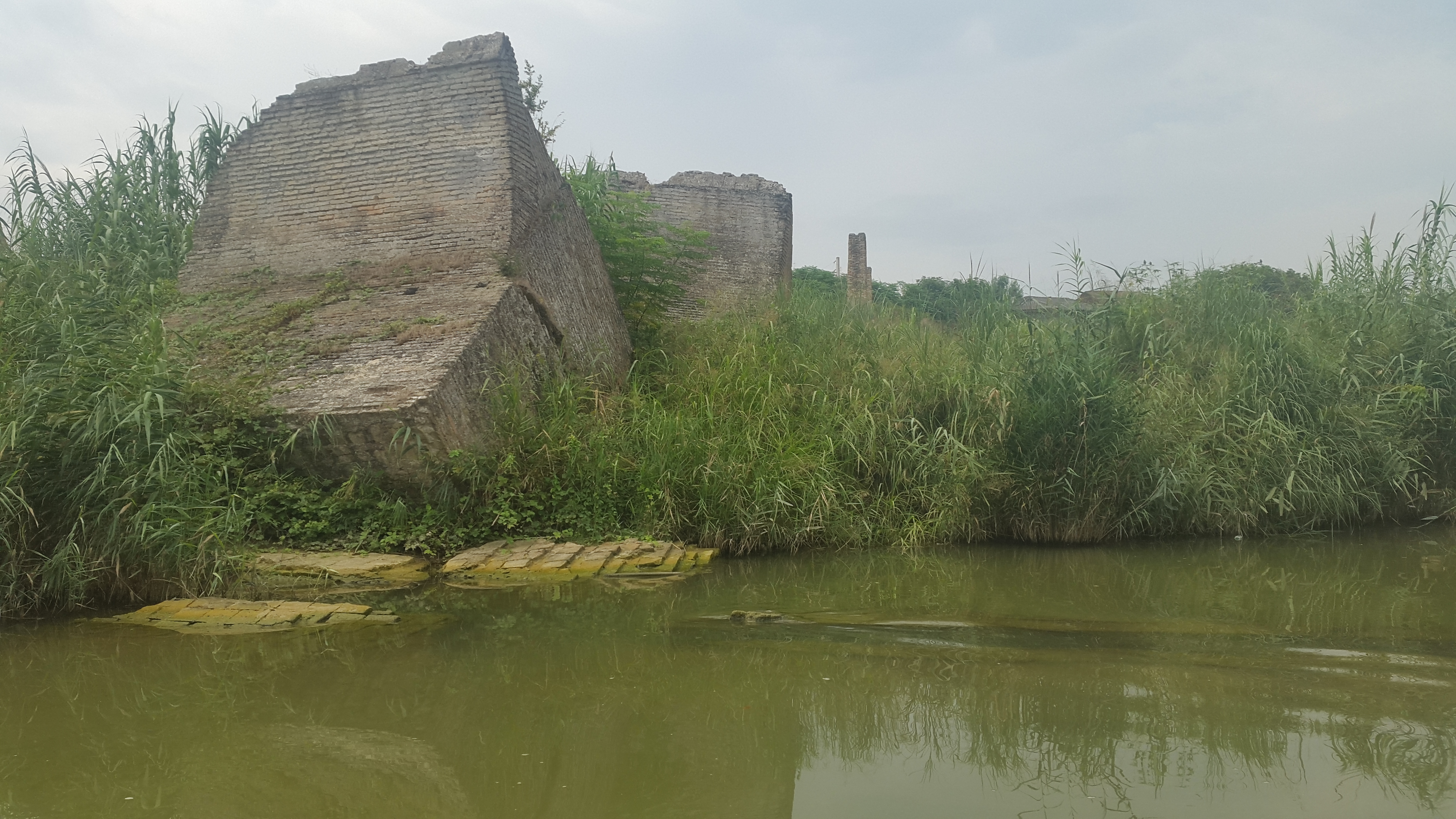

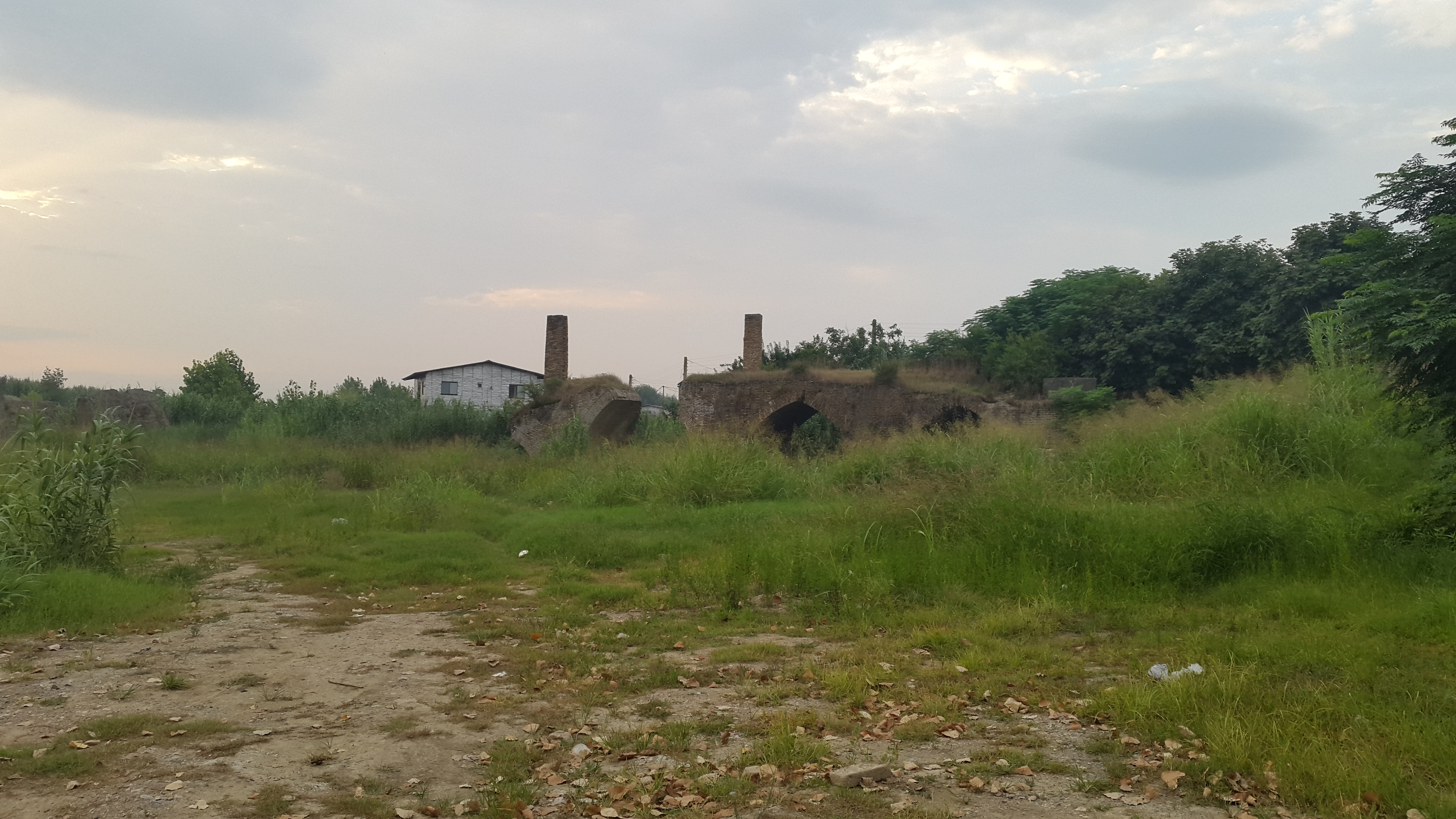

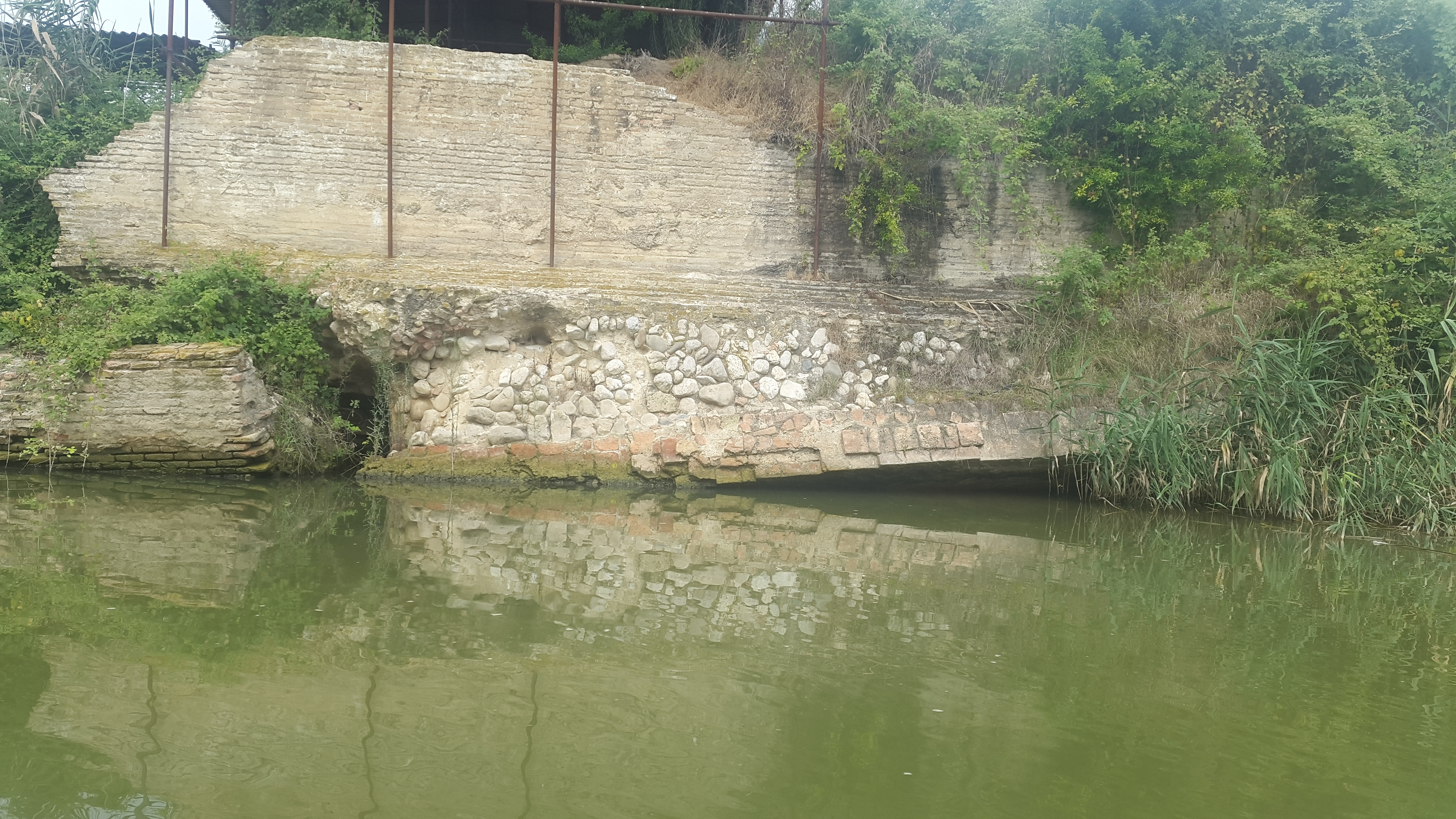

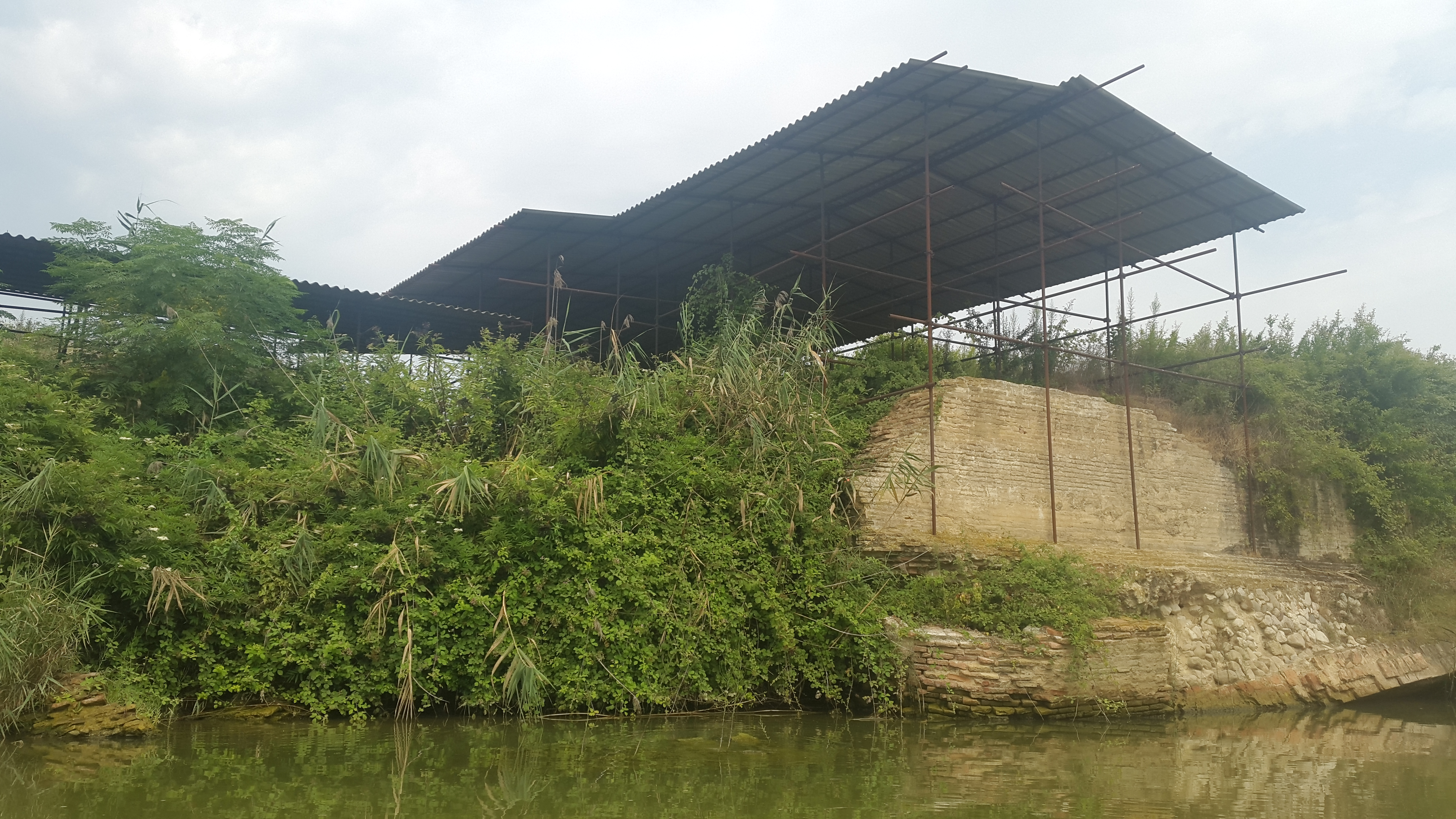
