= Jahan Nama Palace =

- (Persian: کاخ جهان‌نما)
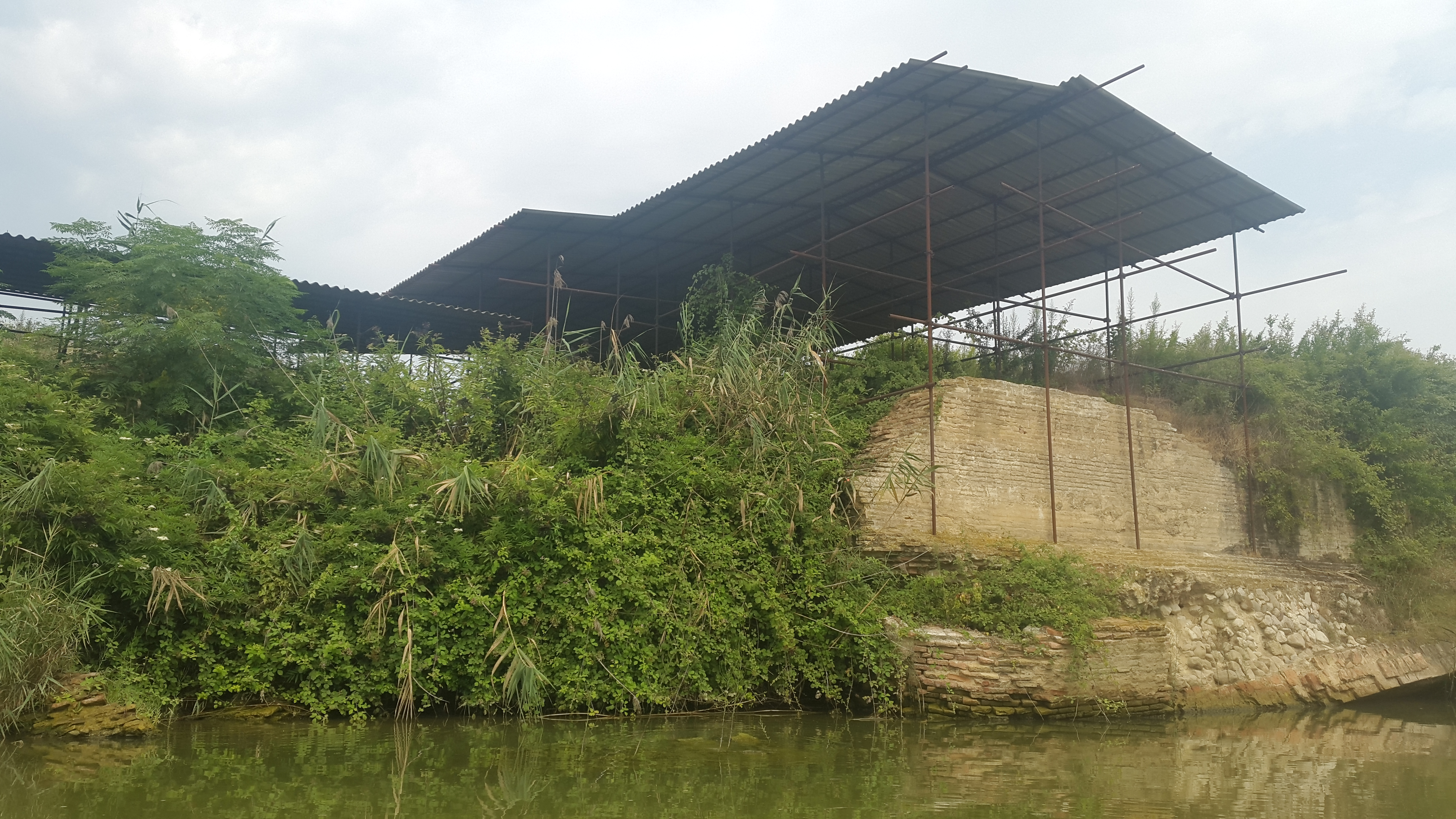

- Location within Iran
- Interactive map of the Jahan Nama Palace area

General information
- Type: Palace
- Location: Mazandaran Province, Farahabad, Iran
- Coordinates: 36°47′37″N 53°06′58″E
- Owner: Cultural Heritage, Handcrafts and Tourism Organization

Design and construction
- Architecture firm: Iranian architecture

Jahan Nama Palace is a Palace in Farahabad, Mazandaran province and is part of the Farahabad Complex. The Palace was built during the reign of Abbas the Great and was destroyed by the Cossacks.
