= House of Dadvey =

The House of Dadvey was one of the important families of Tabarestan during the Zandieh and Qajar periods. During the reign of Karim Khan Zand, this family took power in Mazandaran by defeating the Qajar tribe.

== Origin ==
After Nader Shah's death, Mohammad Hassan Khan Qajar fought against Karim Khan Zand and clashed with them over the capture of Mazandaran.

== Mohammad Khan as ruler of Mazandaran ==
Mohammad Khan made many reforms during the reign of Karim Khan Zand and rebuilt Mazandaran. Mohammad Khan built a ditch called Kalbad on the ruins of Farrukhan the Great's wall, which for years had resisted Mazandaran attacks by the Turkmen. One of Muhammad Khan's actions was to rebuild the Farahabad Mosque.
