= Alena Arzamasskaia =

Russian military rebel (died 1670)

- Born: Vyezdnoye
- Died: 1670
- Military career
- Nickname: The Russian Joan of Arc
- Conflicts: Peasants' Revolt

Alena Arzamasskaia (or Alyona; Erzyan: Эрзямассонь Олёна, Russian: Алёна Арзамасская; died 1670), sometimes called the Russian Joan of Arc, was a famed female rebel fighter in 17th-century Russia, posing as a man and fighting in Cossack Stepan Razin's (Peasants' Revolt) revolt of 1670 in southern Russia. Unlike Joan of Arc, who was fighting in the name of her king, Alyona was rebelling against her czar. She was an Erzyan female ataman under the leadership of Stepan Razin. A peasant by birth from the Vyezdnaya sloboda of Arzamas, she was an elderly nun ("старица") before becoming an ataman. She commanded a detachment of about 600 men and participated in the capture of Temnikov in 1670, before being burned at the stake.

== Early life ==
Alyona was a peasant by birth from the Vyezdnaya sloboda of Arzamas (Volga region) and married a peasant while still a young girl. Her son died and as a child widow, she then became a nun at Nikolaevskii Monastery. While there, she read and studied medicine. She was unhappy at the convent due to the strict regulated life she had to lead. In 1669, she left the convent, cutting her hair and dressing as a man.

== Peasant's Revolt ==
Upon leaving the convent, she joined the Peasants' Revolt (1670-1671) of Stepan Razin as their leader. The revolt was initially a success in southern Russia.

In 1670, she participated in the capture of Temnikov while pretending to be a Cossack rebel leader. She gathered a regiment of men from the areas around her hometown. She soon led a regiment of 300-400 men (in some sources, six thousand fighters) unaware that their leader was a woman. Her skill as an archer and in medicine which learned at the convent, made her popular and respected among the men.

Three months later, the Russian Tsar launched a campaign to suppress the rebels and captured Arzamasskaia. On 30 November 1670, Temnikov was re-taken by Tsarists troops under General Yury A. Dolgorukov. According to a description from 1677, she hid in a church and shot several soldiers before she was taken, embracing the altar, on 4 December. She was tortured in an effort to get the identities of other rebels; however, she resisted and did not divulge any information. Some sources say she was accused of sorcery and heresy; others that she was convicted of brigandage for her role in taking over Temnikov, she was sentenced to be burned at the stake.

The stake was formed as a small cottage with a hole in the "roof", in which she would be burned. She was to have climbed to the stake in silence, performed her rites, jumped down and closed the hatch without a word, and burned in silence. Alyona is described as an amazon with great physical strength and courage greater than most men.

When she was burned at the stake, witnesses reported that she did not make a single sound as she burned to death.

== Sources ==
Степан Разин и его соратники, «Мысль», 1988 г.
