= Monument to Stepan Razin =

- Памятник Степану Разину
- Interactive map of Monument to Stepan Razin
- Location: Rostov-on-Don, Rostov Oblast, Russia
- Designer: Sergey Konenkov
- Material: concrete
- Beginning date: 1972
- Completion date: 1972
- Opening date: June 5, 1972
- Dedicated to: Stepan Razin

Monument to Stepan Razin (Russian: Памятник Степану Разину) is one of the monuments in the city of Rostov-on-Don, Rostov Oblast, Russia. It is dedicated to Stepan Razin, the leader of the peasant uprising of 1670-1671. The monument is also considered to be an object of cultural heritage.

== History ==
Stepan Razin, the leader of the largest peasant and cossack uprising in the middle of the 17th century in Russia, was born and spent his childhood near the Don River. And exactly from there he marched with his loyal people against the Tsar. The Don has a lot of memorable places connected with the legendary Ataman.

In the town of Starocherkasskaya there is the house where he was born. Kagalnitsky town, which was occupied by his army is being examined by archaeologists. Novocherkassk Museum exhibits sculpture of Stepan Razin, a work of E.V. Vucetic. This monument of the famous Ataman, the image of whom has created a lot of legends around itself, inspired many artists. One of them was People's Artist of the USSR S.T. Konenkov (who did not live up to the establishment of the monument, but only created its wooden model) and architect L.M. Loban (who took up the development of a project of the monument dedicated to the Ataman).

All the sculptures were made of concrete at a local factory. The monument to Stepan Razin and his loyal warriors was constructed on June 5, 1972.

== Appearance ==
The monument is a composition of seven sculptures: the figure of Stepan Razin and his Persian princess, as well as five of his loyal warrors. All of them stand on the boat.
