= Russian Rebels, 1600–1800 =

1972 book by Paul Avrich

- First edition
- Author: Paul Avrich
- Subject: Eastern European history, military history
- Published: 1972 (Schocken Books)
- Pages: 320
- ISBN: 978-0-393-00836-4

Russian Rebels, 1600–1800 is a 1972 history book by Paul Avrich about four popular rebellions in early modern Russia (the Bolotnikov rebellion of 1606, the Razin rebellion of 1670, the Bulavin Rebellion of 1707, and Pugachev's Rebellion of 1773–1775) and their relation to the 1905 and 1917 Russian revolutions.
