= Battle of Simbirsk =

- Part of Stepan Razin Rebellion
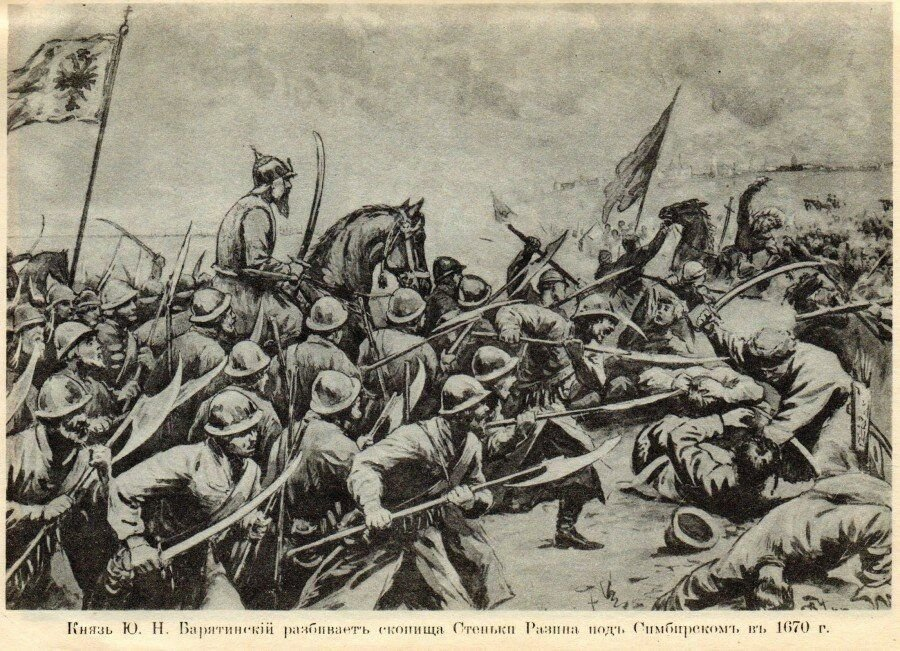
- Attack of the Moscow forces in Battle of Simbirsk 1670
Date	September 14 – October 14, 1670
Location	Ulyanovsk on the Volga, Russia
Result	Rebels defeated

Belligerents
Russian Tsardom	Rebel Cossacks

Commanders and leaders
Yury Baryatinsky	Stepan Razin

Strength
5,000	20,000

Casualties and losses
39 killed, 193 wounded	10,000–15,000

Battle of Simbirsk in 1670 was a decisive battle of Stepan Razin's rebellion.

== Prelude ==
During the summer of 1670, Razin captured Tsaritsyn and Astrakhan. From there, Cossacks on 200 boats sailed up the Volga, taking Saratov and Samara, massacring nobles and plundering their property. On September 4, some 5.000 Cossacks besieged Simbirsk, a small wooden fort, defended by a small force of professional soldiers ("Regiments of the New Order").

== Battle ==
Although the rebels were unable to capture the fort, their ranks swelled to 20.000, including local serfs. While Razin was pinned down at Simbirsk, on September 15, government troops started from Kazan to break the siege, dispersing several rebel detachments on the way. On October 11, both armies met near Simbirsk.

While inferior in numbers, government troops were superior in discipline, armament, and tactics, resulting from the military reforms of Tsar Alexis according to Western European standards.

Disciplined units of Reiters and Dragoons attacked first, firing on rebels at point-blank range, then rapidly retreated, luring rebels into firing ranks of infantry and artillery. Razin himself was wounded twice and fled with some Don Cossacks, while most of the rebels scattered, and subsequently died on the run.

== Aftermath ==
Defeat was decisive for rebellion of Stepan Razin: soon he was betrayed by Don Cossacks and executed on June 16, 1671 in Moscow.
