= Stenka Razin =

Cossack leader (1630–1671)

Stepan Razin
- Степан Разин
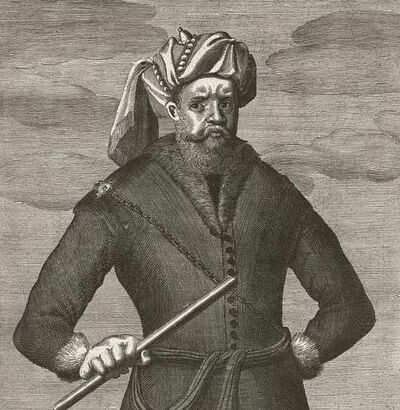
- Portrait of Razin, 1670s
- Born: Stepan Timofeyevich Razin c. 1630; Zimoveyskaya or Cherkassk, Russia
- Died: 16 June 1671 (aged around 40–41); Moscow, Russia
- Cause of death: Execution by dismemberment
- Other name: Stenka Razin
- Known for: leading uprising against tsarist authorities

Stepan Timofeyevich Razin (Russian: Степан Тимофеевич Разин, pronounced [sʲtʲɪˈpan tʲɪmɐˈfʲe(j)ɪvʲɪtɕ ˈrazʲɪn]; c. 1630 – 16 June [O.S. 6 June] 1671), known as Stenka Razin (Стенька [ˈsʲtʲenʲkə]), (Note: Stenka is a diminutive from Stepan; diminutive names were used in reference to commoners at this time, to indicate their low status.) was a Don Cossack leader who led a major uprising against the nobility and tsarist bureaucracy in southern Russia from 1670 to 1671.

== Early life ==
Razin's father, Timofey Razya, supposedly came from a suburb of Voronezh, a city near Russia's steppe frontier, called the Wild Fields. Razin's uncle and grandmother still lived in the village of New Usman' or Usman' Sobakina, 8 kilometres (5.0 mi) outside of Voronezh, until 1667. The identity of Razin's mother is debated. In one document, Razin was referred to as a tuma Cossack which means "half-blood", leading to a hypothesis that his mother was a captured "Turkish" (turchanka) or Crimean Tatar woman. However, this term was also used by "upper Cossacks" as a derogatory nickname towards all "lower Cossacks" regardless of origin. Another hypothesis draws on information about Razin's godmother Matrena Govorukha. According to tradition, a godmother should be related to a birthmother, and Stenka's godmother lived in the town of Tsarev-Borisov.

Razin was first mentioned in historical sources in 1652, when he asked for permission to go on a long-distance pilgrimage to the great Solovetsky Monastery on the White Sea. In 1661, he was mentioned as part of a diplomatic mission from the Don Cossacks to the Kalmyks. After that, all trace of him was lost for six years, after which he reappeared as the leader of a robber community established at Panshinskoye, among the marshes between the Tishina and Ilovlya rivers, whence he levied tribute from all vessels passing up and down the Volga. In 1665, his elder brother, Ivan, was executed by order of Yuri Dolgorukov for unauthorized desertion from the war with the Poles.

Protracted wars with Poland in 1654–1667 and the Russo-Swedish War (1656–1658) put a heavy burden upon the people of Russia. Taxes increased, as did conscription. Many peasants, hoping to escape these burdens, fled south and joined Razin's bands of Cossacks. They were also joined by many others who were disaffected with the Russian government, including people of the lower classes, as well as representatives of non-Russian ethnic groups such as Kalmyks, that were being oppressed at the time.

Razin's first notable exploit was to destroy the great naval convoy consisting of the treasury barges and the barges of the Patriarch and the wealthy merchants of Moscow. Razin then sailed down the Volga with a fleet of 35 vessels, capturing the more important forts on his way and devastating the country. At the beginning of 1668, he defeated the voivode Yakov Bezobrazov, sent against him from Astrakhan, and in the spring embarked on a predatory expedition into Daghestan and Persia, which lasted for eighteen months.

== Background ==
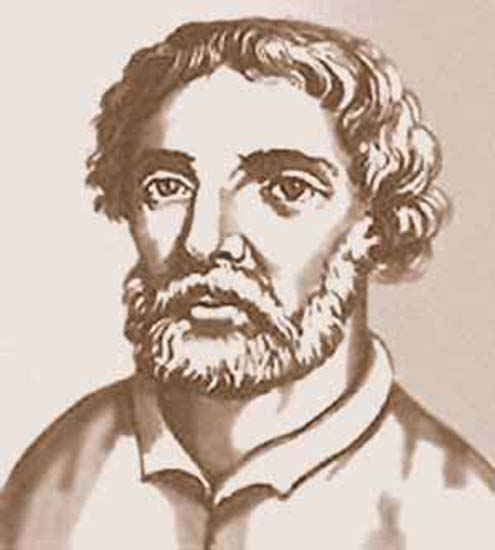
Stepan Razin in a contemporary English engraving

The Time of Troubles, which lasted from 1598 to 1613, had proven a difficult period for Russia. The direct male line of Rurik dynasty tsars died out in 1598, and the rule of the Romanov dynasty (which would eventually end with the February Revolution of 1917) began only in 1613. The reigns of Michael Romanov (tsar from 1613 to 1645) and of his son Alexis (tsar from 1645 to 1676) saw a strengthening of the power of the tsar with a view to stabilizing the Russian lands after the turmoil of the Time of Troubles. As a result, the Zemsky Sobor and the boyar council, two other bodies of government in Russia, slowly lost influence. The Russian population went from fifteen years of "near anarchy" to the reigns of strong, centralizing autocrats.

In addition, a deep divide existed between the peasantry and the nobility in Russia. Changes in the treatment and legal standing of peasants, including the institutionalization of serfdom with the Law Code of 1649, contributed to unrest among the peasantry. The Don Cossacks, a largely lower-class group which lived independently near the Don River and which the tsar's government subsidized in exchange for defending Russia's southern borders, led Razin's rebellion. Historian Paul Avrich characterizes Razin's revolt as a "curious mixture of brigandage and revolt", similar to other popular uprisings of the period. Razin revolted against the "traitor-boyars" rather than against the tsar. Cossacks supported the tsar in that they worked for him as contracted military forces - just as they had previously served the Polish-Lithuanian Commonwealth.

== Departure from the Don ==
In 1667, Razin gathered a small group of Cossacks and left the Don for an expedition in the Caspian Sea. He aimed to set up a base in Yaitsk (now known as Oral, located in Kazakhstan on the Ural River) and plunder villages from there. However, Moscow learned of Razin's plans and attempted to stop him. As Razin traveled down the Volga River to Tsaritsyn, the voivodes of Astrakhan warned Andrei Unkovsky (the voivode or governor of Tsaritsyn) of Razin's arrival and recommended that he not allow the Cossacks to enter the town.

Unkovsky attempted to negotiate with Razin, but Razin threatened to set fire to Tsaritsyn if Unkovsky interfered. When he encountered a group of political prisoners being transported by the tsar's representatives on his way from the Don to the Volga, Razin reportedly said, "I shall not force you to join me, but whoever chooses to come with me will be a free Cossack. I have come to fight only the boyars and the wealthy lords. As for the poor and common folk, I shall treat them as brothers."

When Razin sailed by Tsartisyn, Unkovsky did not attack (possibly either because he felt that Razin posed a threat or because the guards of Tsaritsyn sympathized with Razin's Cossacks). This incident gave Razin the reputation of an "invincible warrior endowed with supernatural powers." He continued his travels down the Volga and into the Caspian Sea, defeating several detachments of streltsy, or musketeers. In July 1667, Razin captured Yaitsk by disguising himself and some of his companions as pilgrims to pray at the cathedral. Once inside Yaitsk, they opened the gates for the rest of the troops to enter and occupy the city. The opposition sent to fight Razin felt reluctant to do so because they sympathized with the Cossacks.

In the spring of 1668, Razin led the majority of his men down the Yaik River (also known as the Ural River) while a small portion stayed behind to guard Yaitsk. However, the government defeated Razin's men in Yaitsk and Razin lost his base there.

== Persian expedition ==
Stepan Razin Sailing in the Caspian Sea by Vasily Surikov, 1906.

After losing Yaitsk, Razin sailed south down the coast of the Caspian Sea to continue his pillaging. He and his men then attacked Persia. Failing to capture the well-defended fortress port of Derbent in present-day Dagestan, his forces moved south to attack the small port of Badkuba (present Baku) located on the Absheron Peninsula in present-day Azerbaijan, but at Rasht (in the southwest Caspian Sea in modern Iran) the Persians killed roughly 400 Cossacks in a surprise attack. Razin went to Isfahan to ask the shah for land in Persia in exchange for loyalty to the shah, but departed on the Caspian for more pillaging before they could reach an agreement. Razin arrived in Farahabad (on the southern shore of the Caspian Sea in Iran) and masqueraded as a merchant in the city for several days before he and his men pillaged the city for two days. That winter the Cossacks with Razin fended off starvation and disease on the Miankaleh Peninsula, and in the spring of 1669 Razin built a base on the eastern coast of the Caspian Sea and began raiding Turkmen villages. Then in the spring of 1669 he established himself on the isle of Suina, off which, in July, he annihilated a Persian fleet sent against him. Stenka Razin, as he was generally called, had now become a potentate with whom princes did not disdain to treat.

In August 1669, he reappeared at Astrakhan and accepted a fresh offer of pardon from Tsar Alexei Mikhailovich there; the common people were fascinated by his adventures. The lawless Russian border region of Astrakhan, where the whole atmosphere was predatory and many people were still nomadic, was the natural milieu for such a rebellion as Razin's.

== Open rebellion ==
Stepan Razin Rebellion
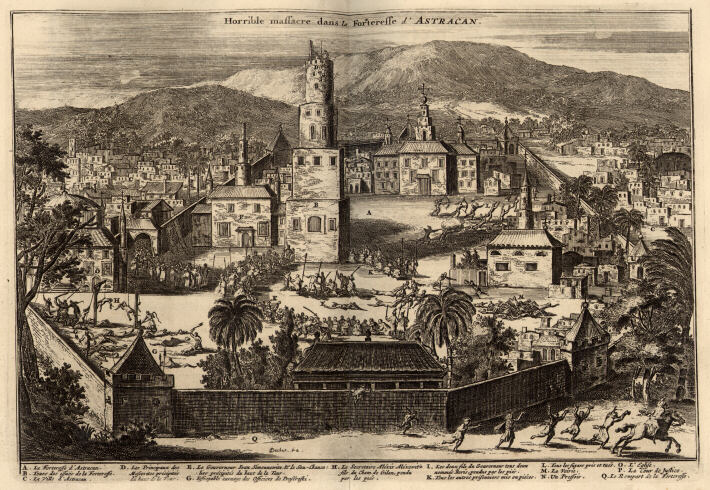
- Razin's rebels in Astrakhan, a Dutch engraving from 1681 by Jan Janszoon Struys
Date	1670–1671
Location	Don, Volga, Kazan
Result	Rebellion suppressed

Belligerents
Russian Tsardom	Rebels

Commanders and leaders
Yury Dolgorukov; Yury Baryatinsky	Stepan Razin (executed); Vasily Us (executed); Alena Arzamasskaia (executed)

Strength
More than 60,000 soldiers (August 1670)	Not more than 500 people (1667); More than 3,000 people (June 1670); About 20,000 people (October 1670)

In 1670, Razin, while ostensibly on his way to report at the Cossack headquarters on the Don, openly rebelled against the government, capturing Cherkassk and Tsaritsyn. After taking Tsaritsyn, Razin sailed down the Volga with his army of almost 7,000 men. The men traveled toward Cherny Yar, a government stronghold between Tsaritsyn and Astrakhan. Razin and his men swiftly took Cherny Yar when the Cherny Yar streltsy rose up against their officers and joined the Cossack cause in June 1670. On 24 June Razin reached the city of Astrakhan. Astrakhan, Russia's wealthy "window on the East", occupied a strategically important location at the mouth of the Volga River on the shore of the Caspian Sea. Razin plundered the city - despite its location on a strongly fortified island and the stone walls and brass cannons that surrounded the central citadel. The local rebellion of the streltsy allowed Razin to gain access to the city.

After massacring all who opposed him (including two Princes Prozorovsky) and giving the rich bazaars of the city over to pillage, Razin converted Astrakhan into a Cossack republic, dividing the population into thousands, hundreds, and tens, with their proper officers, all of whom were appointed by a veche or general assembly, whose first act was to proclaim Razin their gosudar (sovereign).

After a three-week carnival of blood and debauchery, Razin quit Astrakhan with two hundred barges full of troops. He intended to establish a Cossack republic along the whole length of the Volga as a preliminary step towards advancing against Moscow. Saratov and Samara were captured, but Simbirsk defied all efforts, and after two bloody encounters close at hand on the banks of the Sviyaga River ( 1 and 4 October), Razin was ultimately routed by the army of Yuri Baryatinsky and fled down the Volga, leaving the bulk of his followers to be extirpated by the victors.

But the rebellion was by no means over. The emissaries of Razin, armed with inflammatory proclamations, had stirred up the inhabitants of what became the governorates of Nizhny Novgorod, Tambov, and Penza, and penetrated even as far as Moscow and Novgorod. It was not difficult to stir the oppressed population to revolt by promising deliverance from their yoke. Razin proclaimed that his object was to root out the boyars and all officials, to level all ranks and dignities, and establish Cossackdom, with its corollary of absolute equality, throughout Russia.

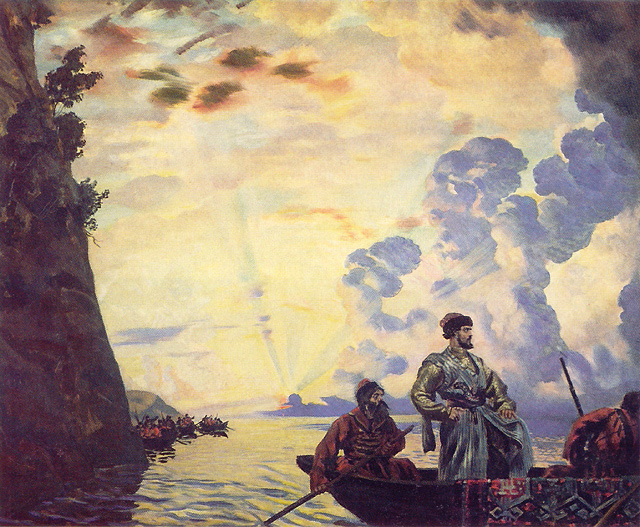
Stepan Razin on the Volga by Boris Kustodiev, (1918) State Russian Museum in St Petersburg.

Even at the beginning of 1671 the outcome of the struggle remained in doubt. Eight battles had been fought before the insurrection showed signs of weakening, and it continued for six months after Razin had received his quietus. At Simbirsk his prestige had been shattered. Even his own settlements at Saratov and Samara refused to open their gates to him, and the Don Cossacks, hearing that the Patriarch had anathematized Razin, also declared against him. The tsar sent troops to suppress the revolt. As Paul Avrich notes in Russian Rebels, 1600–1800, "The brutality of the repressions by far exceeded the atrocities committed by the insurgents." The tsar's troops mutilated the rebels' bodies and displayed them in public to serve as a warning to potential dissenters.

In 1671, Stepan and his brother Frol Razin were captured at Kagalnik Fortress (Кагальницкий городок) by Cossack elders. They were given over to Tsarist officials in Moscow, and on 16 June 1671, following the announcement of the verdict against him, Stepan Razin was quartered on the scaffold on Red Square. A sentence of death was read aloud: Razin listened to this calmly, then turned to the church, bowed in three directions, passing the Kremlin and the tsar and said: "Forgive me." The executioner then proceeded to first cut off his right hand to his elbow, then his left foot to the knee. His brother Frol, witnessing Stepan's torment, shouted out: "I know the word and the matter of the sovereign!" (that is, "I am willing to inform upon those disloyal to the tsar"). Stepan shouted back, "Shut up, dog!" These were his last words; after them the executioner hurriedly cut off his head. Razin's hands, legs, and head, according to the testimony of the Englishman Thomas Hebdon, were stuck on five specially-placed stakes. The confession helped Frol to postpone his own execution, although five years later, in 1676, he was executed too.

== Implications ==
Razin originally set out to loot villages, but as he became a symbol of peasant unrest, his movement turned political. Razin wanted to protect the independence of the Cossacks and to protest an increasingly centralized government. The Cossacks supported the tsar and autocracy, but they wanted a tsar that responded to the needs of the people and not just those of the upper class. By destroying and pillaging villages, Razin intended to take power from the government officials and give more autonomy to the peasants. However, Razin's movement failed and the rebellion led to increased government control. The Cossacks lost some of their autonomy, and the tsar bonded more closely with the upper class because both feared more rebellion. On the other hand, as Avrich asserts, "[Razin's revolt] awakened, however dimly, the social consciousness of the poor, gave them a new sense of power, and made the upper class tremble for their lives and possessions."

At the time of the Russian Civil War, the famous writer and White emigre Ivan Bunin compared Razin to Bolshevik leaders, writing "Good God! What striking similarity there is between the time of Sten'ka and the pillaging that is going on today in the name of the 'Third International'."

== In Russian-language culture and folklore ==
=== Razin and the "Persian princess" ===
One of the most popular cultural motifs associated with Razin is the episode with the drowning of the "Persian princess" in the river. Modern historians doubt the reality of this episode. There are two reports of foreigners who ended up in Astrakhan during the uprising. One of the testimonies is from the memoirs of the Dutch traveler Jan Struis. This testimony is much more famous: it was widely used by Russian historians and it served as the basis for the plot of the song Stenka Razin. The other is the notes of the Dutchman Ludwig Fabricius, which became known only after the Second World War. In the first, a Persian princess appears, drowned in the Volga; in the second, a certain "Tatar maiden" drowned in the Yaik River. Streis conveys the story as drunken cruelty, and Fabricius as the fulfillment of the oath that Razin made to a certain "water god" Ivan Gorinovich, who controls the Yaik River: Razin promised that as a reward for good luck he would give this "god" the best he has.

=== Stenka Razin song ===
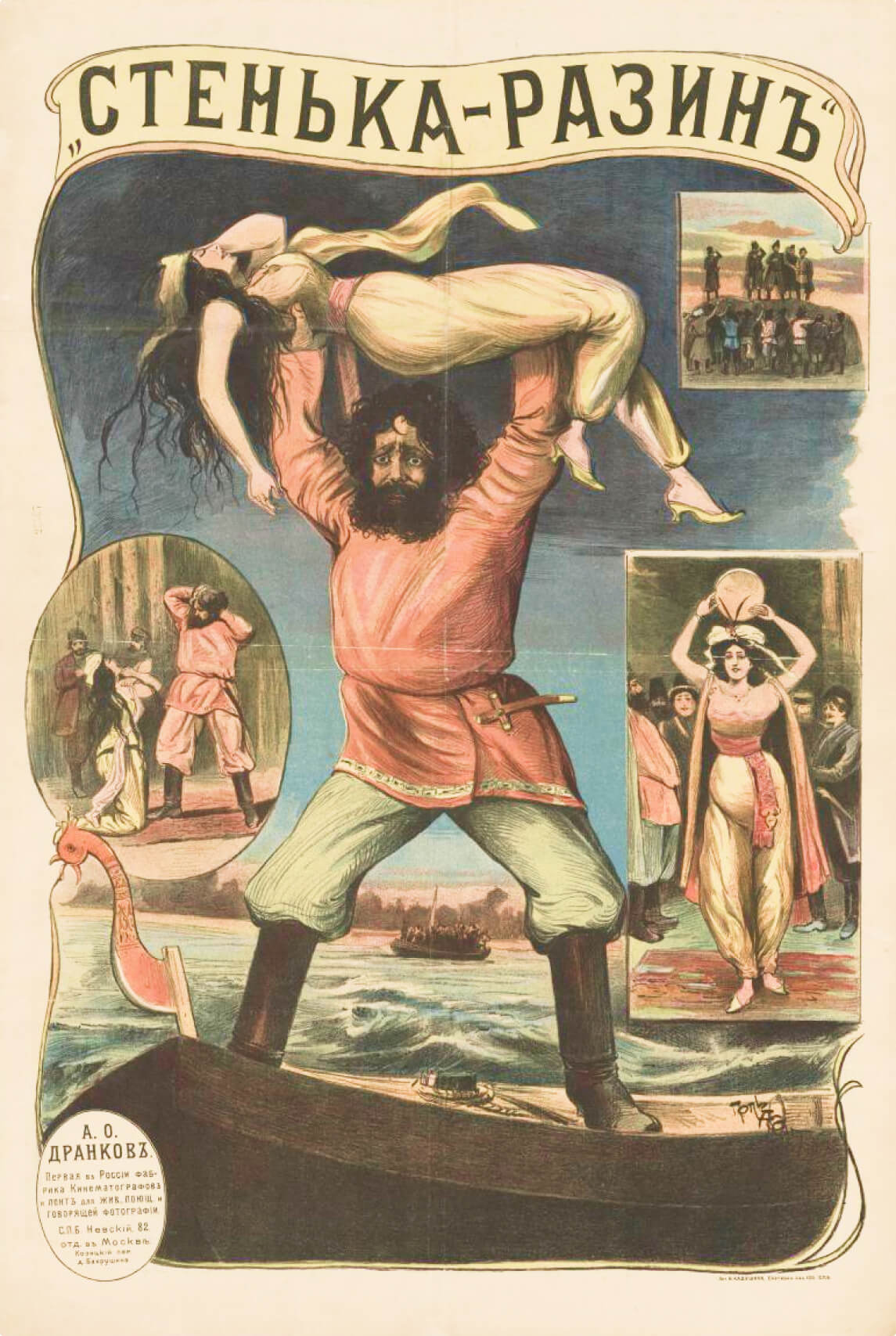
Russian film poster (Stenka Razin of 1908)

Stenka Razine
Folksong about Stenka Razin performed by Feodor Ivanovich Chaliapin

In 1883, the Russian poet Dmitry Sadovnikov published the poem "Stenka Razin", which he, as was customary, presented as a "folk epic". The text of this poem, with minor changes, was set to music by an unknown author and became extremely popular, and was performed by many famous singers. The song recounts that Razin aboard his ship marries the captured "Persian princess" and his men accuse him of weakness — spending "one short night" with a woman — and that he himself has become a "woman" the next morning. Hearing these speeches, Razin throws the "princess" into the water as a gift to the Volga river, and continues the drunken fun with his men.

The lyrics of the song were dramatized in one of the first Russian narrative films, Stenka Razin, directed by Vladimir Romashkov and produced by Alexander Drankov in 1908. The film lasts about 10 minutes. The screenplay was written by Vasily Goncharov, and the music (the first film music to be specially written to accompany a silent film) was by Mikhail Ippolitov-Ivanov.

The song was included in early radio broadcasts in 1923, designed to introduce the new medium to peasant communities. An account of this was given by Charles Ashleigh, who visited a training college for electrical engineers located in Trinity Lavra of St. Sergius.

The popular song is known by the words Volga, Volga mat' rodnaya, Iz za ostrova na strezhen, and, simply, Stenka Razin. The song gave the title to the famous Soviet musical comedy Volga-Volga. The melody was used by Tom Springfield in the song "The Carnival Is Over" that placed The Seekers at No. 1 in 1965 in Australia and the UK.

A version of this song is also performed by Doukhobors in Canada.

Score:

Words in Russian
Transcribed
English-language version (not a translation)

Из-за острова на стрежень,
На простор речной волны,
Выплывают расписные,
Острогрудые челны.

Iz-za ostrova na strěžěn',
Na prostor rěčnoj volny,
Vyplyvajųt raspisnyję,
Ostrogrudyję čjŏlny.

From beyond the wooded island
To the river wide and free
Proudly sail the arrow-breasted
Ships of Cossack yeomanry.

На переднем Стенька Разин,
Обнявшись, сидит с княжной,
Свадьбу новую справляет,
Сам весёлый и хмельной.

Na pěrědněm Stěn'ka Razin,
Obnjąvšis', sidit s knjąžnoj,
Svad'bu novujų spravljąjęt,
Sam věsjŏlyj i xměl'noj.

On the first is Stenka Razin
With his princess by his side.
Drunk, he holds a marriage revel,
Clasping close his fair young bride

Позади их слышен ропот:
Нас на бабу променял!
Только ночь с ней провозился
Сам наутро бабой стал . . . .

Pozadi ix slyšjŏn ropot:
Nas na babu proměnjąl!
Tol'ko noč' s něj provozilsją
Sam nautro baboj stal . . . .

From behind there comes a murmur:
"He has left his sword to woo;
One short night and Stenka Razin
Has become a woman, too."

Этот ропот и насмешки
Слышит грозный атаман,
И он мощною рукою
Обнял персиянки стан.

Etot ropot i nasměški
Slyšit groznyj ataman,
I on moşçnojų rukojų
Obnjąl pěrsijąnki stan.

Stenka Razin hears the murmur
Of his discontented band
And the lovely Persian princess
He has circled with his hand.

Брови чёрные сошлися,
Надвигается гроза.
Буйной кровью налилися
Атамановы глаза.

Brovi čjŏrnyjě sošlisją,
Nadvigajętsją groza.
Bujnoj krov'jų nalilisją
Atamanovy glaza.

His dark brows are drawn together
As the waves of anger rise,
And the blood comes rushing swiftly
To his piercing jet-black eyes.

"Всё отдам не пожалею,
Буйну голову отдам!" —
Раздаётся голос властный
По окрестным берегам.

"Vsjŏ otdam ně požalějų,
Bujnu golovu otdam!" —
Razdajŏtsją golos vlastnyj
Po okrěstnym běrěgam.

"I will give you all you ask for,
Head and heart and life and hand!"
And his voice rolls out like thunder
Out across the distant land.

А она, потупя очи,
Не жива и не мертва,
Молча слушает хмельные
Атамановы слова.

A ona, potupją oči,
Ne živa i ně měrtva,
Molča slušajęt xmel'nyję
Atamanovy slova.

And she, lowering her eyes,
Not alive nor dead is she,
Silently listens to the cries
of the Ataman groggy.

"Волга, Волга, мать родная,
Волга, русская река,
Не видала ты подарка
От донского казака!

"Volga, Volga, mat' rodnają,
Volga, russkają rěka,
Ně vidala ty podarka
Ot donskoğo kazaka!

"Volga, Volga, Mother Volga,
Wide and deep beneath the sun,
You have ne'er seen such a present
From the Cossacks of the Don!

"Чтобы не было раздора
Между вольными людьми,
Волга, Волга, мать родная,
На, красавицу возьми!"

"Čtoby ně bylo razdora
Měždu vol'nymi ljųd'mi,
Volga, Volga, mat' rodnają,
Na, krasavicu voz'mi!"

"So that peace may reign for ever
In this band so free and brave,
Volga, Volga, Mother Volga,
Make this lovely girl a grave!"

Мощным взмахом поднимает
Он красавицу княжну
И за борт её бросает
В набежавшую волну.

Moşçnym vzmaxom podnimajęt
On krasavicu knjąžnu
I za bort jęjŏ brosajęt
V naběžavšujų volnu.

Now, with one swift mighty motion
He has raised his bride on high
And has cast her where the waters
Of the Volga roll and sigh.

"Что ж вы, братцы, приуныли?
Эй, ты, Филька, чёрт, пляши!
Грянем песню удалую
На помин её души!.."

"Čto ž vy, bratcy, priunyli?
Ej, ty, Fil'ka, čjŏrt, pljąši!
Grjąněm pěsnjų udalujų
Na pomin jęjŏ duši!.."

"Dance, you fools, and let's be merry.
What is this that's in your eyes?
Let us thunder out a chanty
To the place where beauty lies!"

Из-за острова на стрежень,
На простор речной волны,
Выплывают расписные
Острогрудые челны.

Iz-za ostrova na strěžěn',
Na prostor rěčnoj volny,
Vyplyvajųt raspisnyję
Ostrogrudyję čjŏlny.

From beyond the wooded island
To the river wide and free
Proudly sail the arrow-breasted
Ships of Cossack yeomanry.

=== Other issues ===
Razin is the subject of a symphonic poem by Alexander Glazunov (Op 13 1885), Symphony no. 8 by Myaskovsky (op. 26, 1925), a cantata by Shostakovich, op. 119; The Execution of Stepan Razin (1964), a poem by Yevgeny Yevtushenko, and a novel, I Have Come To Give You Freedom, (Я пришёл дать вам волю) by Vasily Shukshin.

In 1965, the Red Army Choir, with the soloist Leonid Kharitonov, performed the Russian folk song "The Cliff", which praises Razin for being the only man that was able to climb up to the top of the horrible cliff.

Beside that, Razin was glorified in the Soviet drama film of 1939 directed by Ivan Pravov and Olga Preobrazhenskaya.

In 1972 Monument to Stepan Razin has been installed in Rostov-on-Don.

One of his atamans, Alena Arzamasskaia, was a former nun.

Razin is the subject of the Landmark book "Chief of the Cossacks".

== Citations ==
- Avrich, Paul (1976), Russian Rebels, 1600-1800, New York: Schocken Books, ISBN 9780393008364
- Bunin, Ivan Alekseevich (1998), Cursed Days: A Diary of Revolution, translated by Marullo, Thomas Gaiton, Chicago: Ivan R. Dee, ISBN 9781566635165
- Bain, Robert Nisbet (1911). "Razin, Stephen Timofeevich" . Encyclopædia Britannica. Vol. 22 (11th ed.). p. 937.
- Field, Cecil (1947), The great Cossack; the rebellion of Stenka Razin against Alexis Michaelovitch, Tsar of all the Russias, London: H. Jenkins 125 p. Biography in English.
- Gritchen, Peter, "Doukhobors: About Stenka Razin", Canadian Museum of History
- Malov, Aleksandr Vitalʹevich (Russian: А.В. Малов) (2006), Moskovskie vybornye polki soldatskogo stroi︠a︡ v nachalʹnyĭ period svoeĭ istorii, 1656-1671 gg. Московские выборные полки солдатского строя в начальный период своей истории, 1656-1671 гг., Moscow: Drevlekhranilishche (Russian: Древлехранилище), ISBN 5936461068, OCLC 75971374
- Osipov, Yury Sergeyevich, ed. (2019), "Razin" Разин, Bolshaya rossiyskaya entsiklopediya
- Perrie, Maureen (2006), The Cambridge History of Russia, Volume 1: From Early Rus' to 1689, New York: Cambridge University Press, ISBN 9780521812276
- Soloviev, Sergei M.; Smith, T. Allen (trans.) (1976), History of Russia, Volume 21: The Tsar and the Patriarch, Stenka Razin Revolts on the Don, 1662-1675, Gulf Breeze, FL: Academic International Press
- Sakharov, Andrei Nikolaevich (1973), "Stepan Razin (Khronika XVII v.)", Mol. gvardiia, Moscow 319 p. Biography in Russian.
- Soloviev, Vladimir Mikhaylovich (1990). Степан Разин и его время [Stepan Razin and his time]. Moscow: Просвещение. ISBN 5-09-001902-9. 93 p. Biography in Russian.
- Chertanov, Maksim (2016). Степан Разин. The Lives of Remarkable People (ZhZL). Moscow: Molodaya Gvardiya. ISBN 978-5-235-03881-3., 383 p. Biography in Russian.
