= Farahabad Mosque =

Mosque in Farahabad, Sari County, Mazandaran, Iran

- مسجد فرح‌آباد
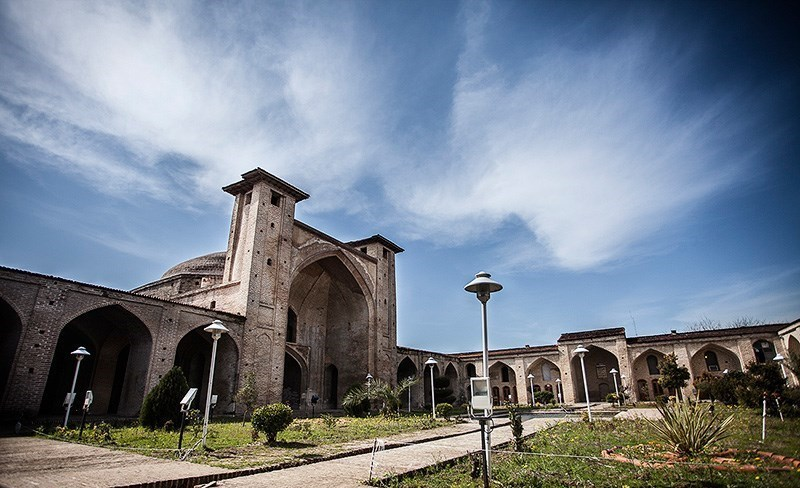
- The mosque in 2014

- Location of the mosque in Iran

Religion
- Affiliation: Shia Islam
- Ecclesiastical or organizational status: Mosque
- Status: Active

Location
- Location: Farahabad Complex, Farahabad, Sari County, Mazandaran Province
- Country: Iran
- Interactive map of Farahabad Mosque
- Coordinates: 36°47′37″N 53°06′58″E

Architecture
- Type: Mosque architecture
- Style: Safavid
- Completed: 1616 CE

Specifications
- Dome: One (maybe more)
- Materials: Bricks; saruj; plaster; tiles

Iran National Heritage List
- Official name: Farahabad Mosque
- Type: Built
- Designated: 7 March 1977
- Reference no.: unknown
- Conservation organization: Cultural Heritage, Handicrafts and Tourism Organization of Iran

The Farahabad Mosque (Persian: مسجد فرح‌آباد; Arabic: مسجد فرح أباد) is a mosque that is part of the Farahabad Complex, located in Farahabad, Sari County, in the province of Mazandaran, Iran.

The mosque was completed in 1616 CE, during the Safavid era, and was added to the Iran National Heritage List on 7 March 1977, administered by the Cultural Heritage, Handicrafts and Tourism Organization of Iran.

== Gallery ==
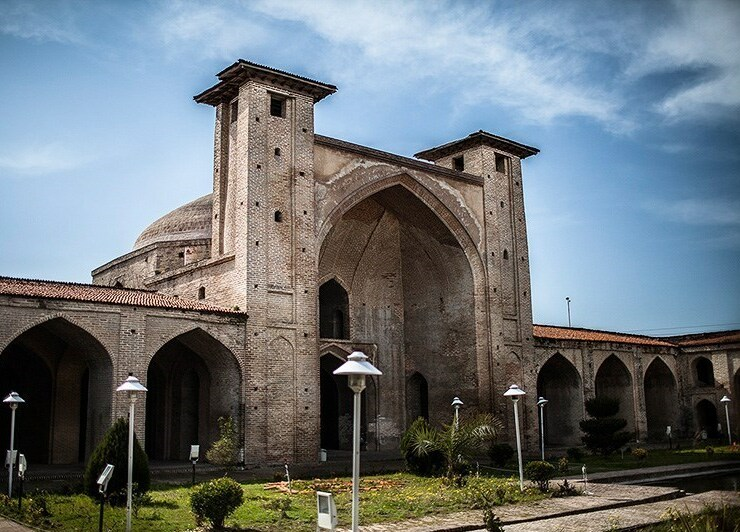

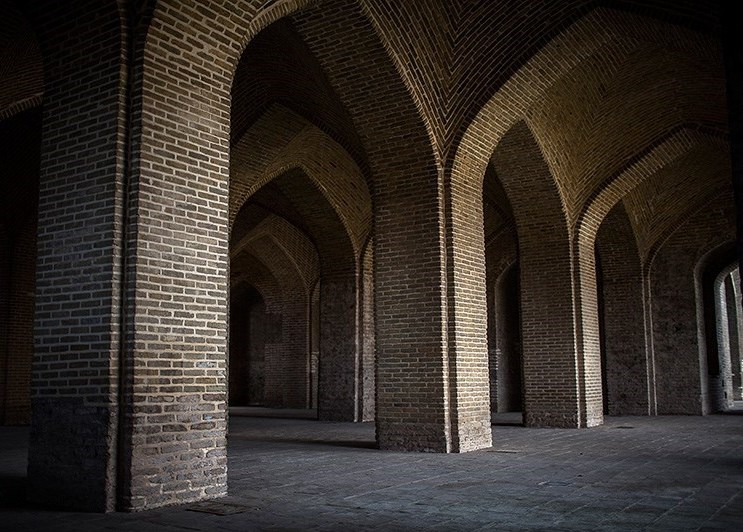

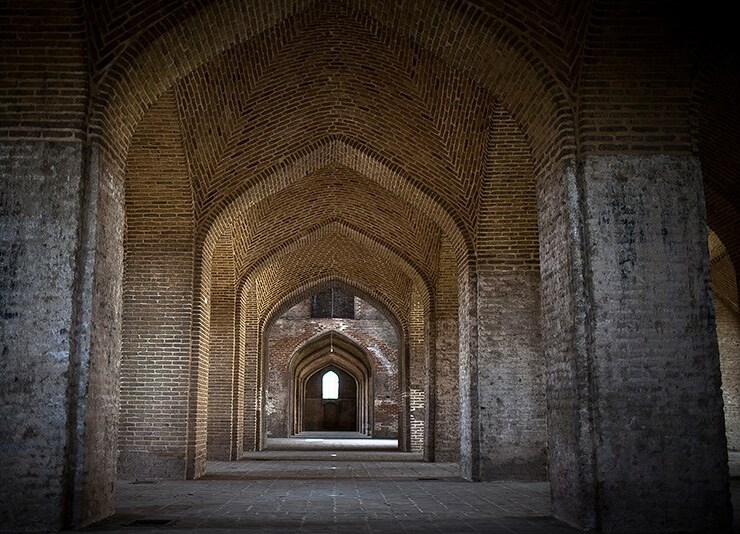

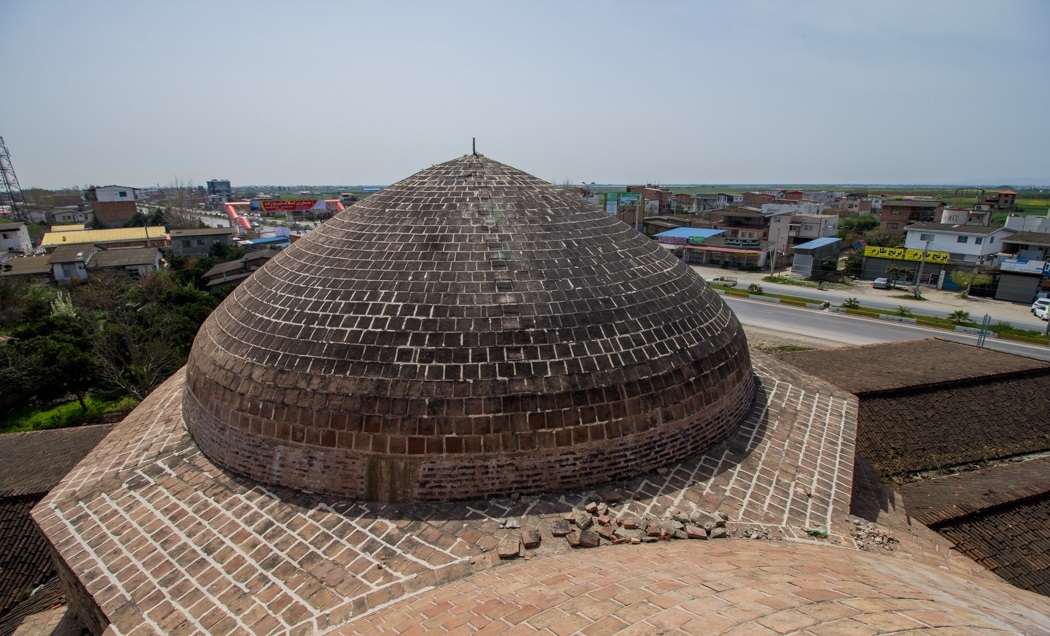

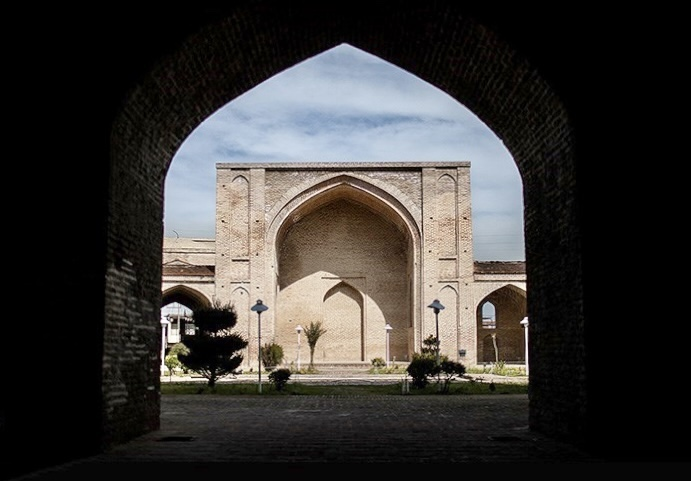

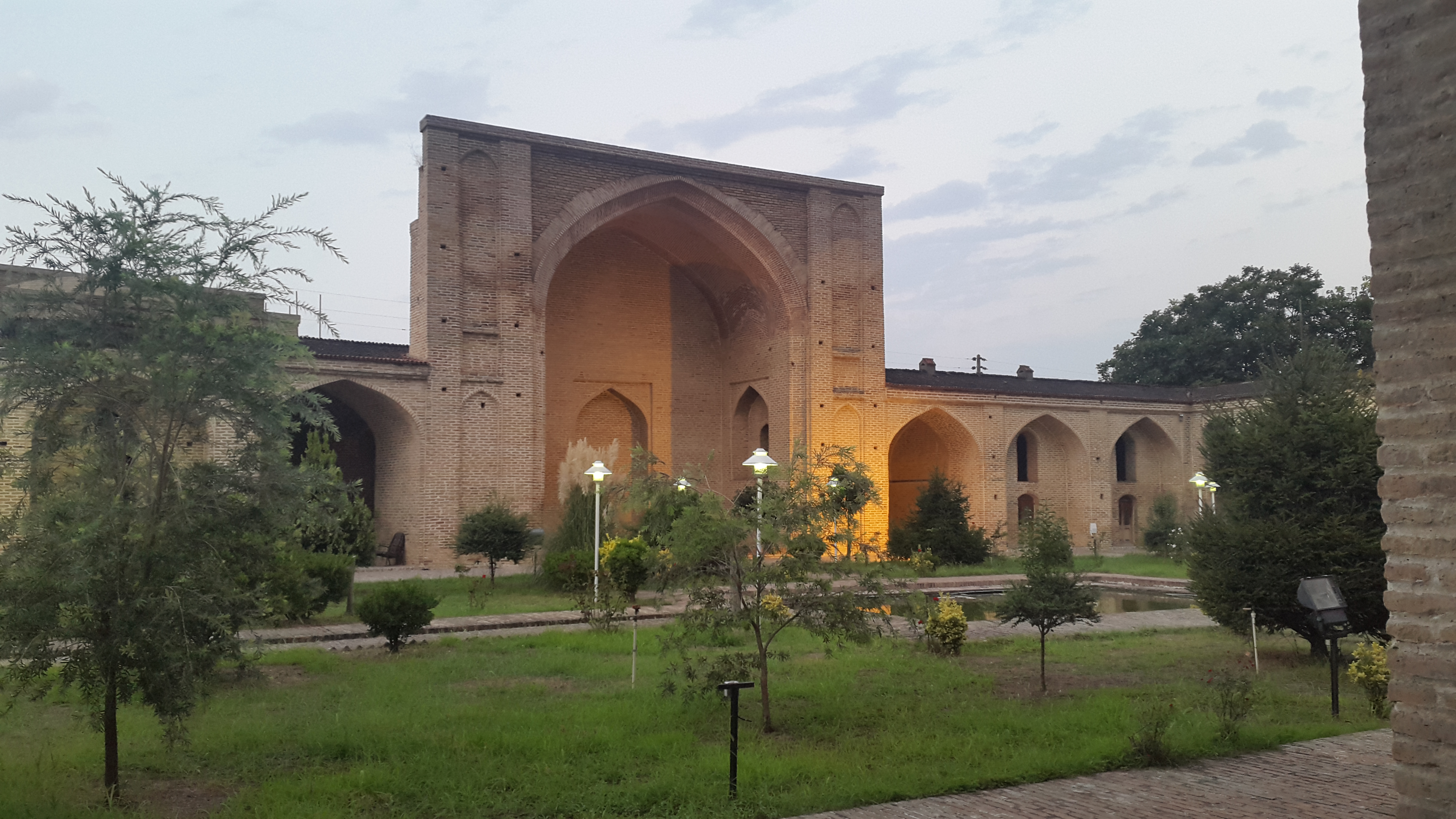

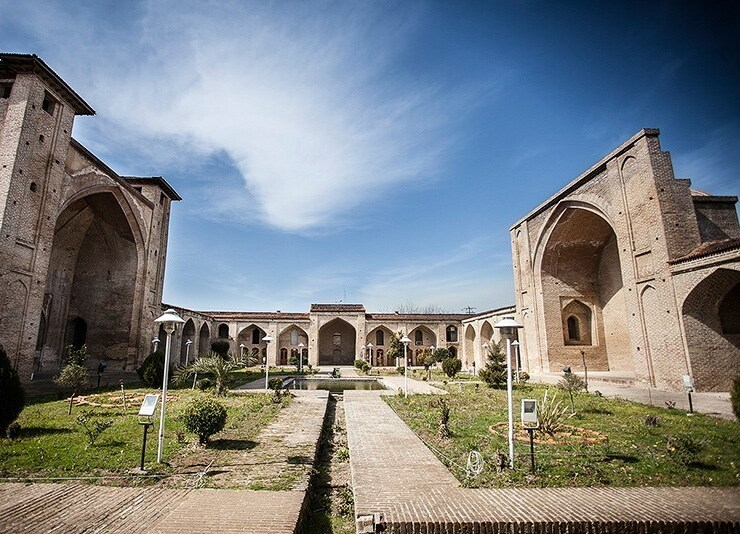

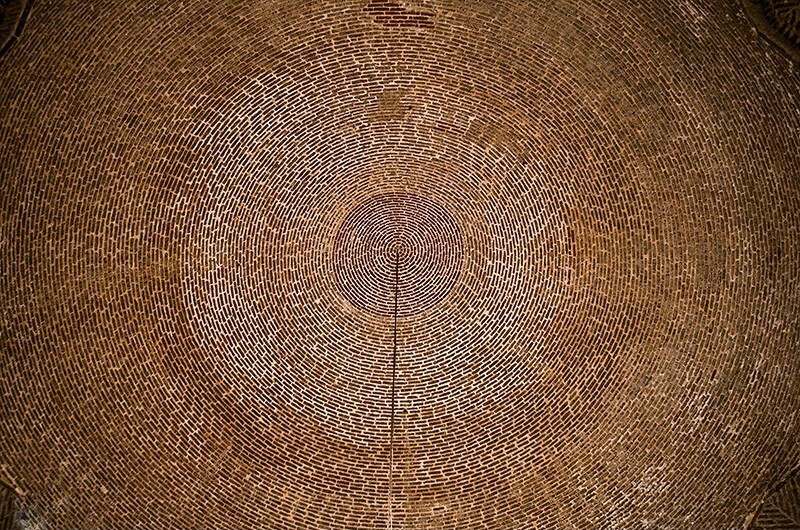

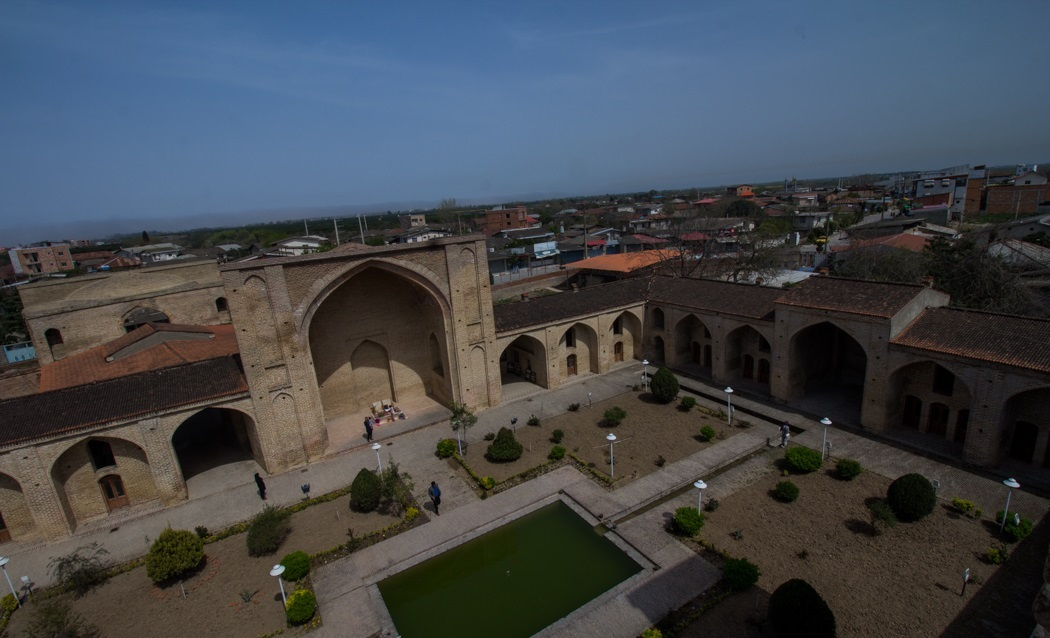

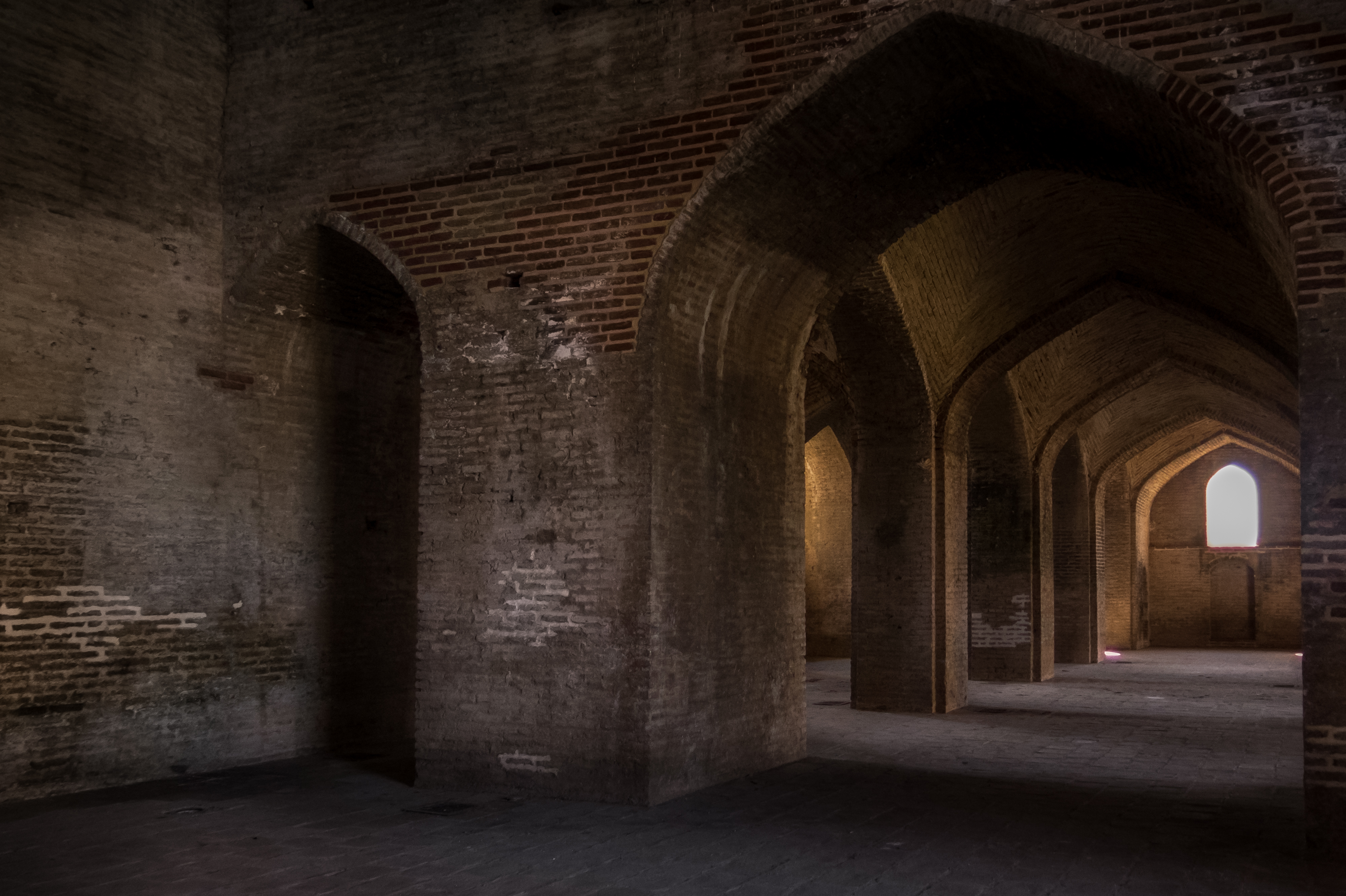

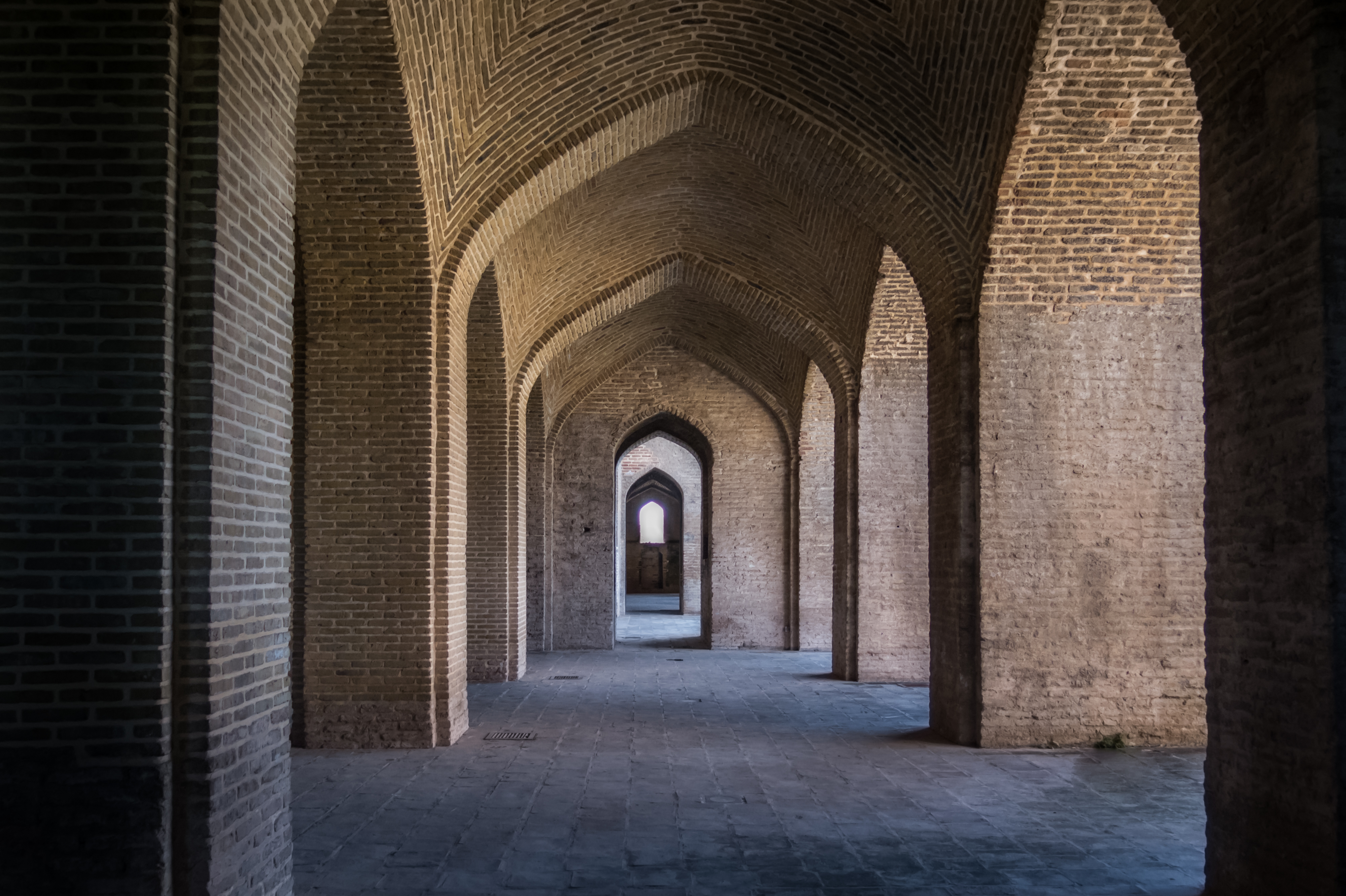

== See also ==
- Shia Islam in Iran
- List of mosques in Iran
