= Yury Baryatinsky =

Russian noble (c. 1610 – 1685)

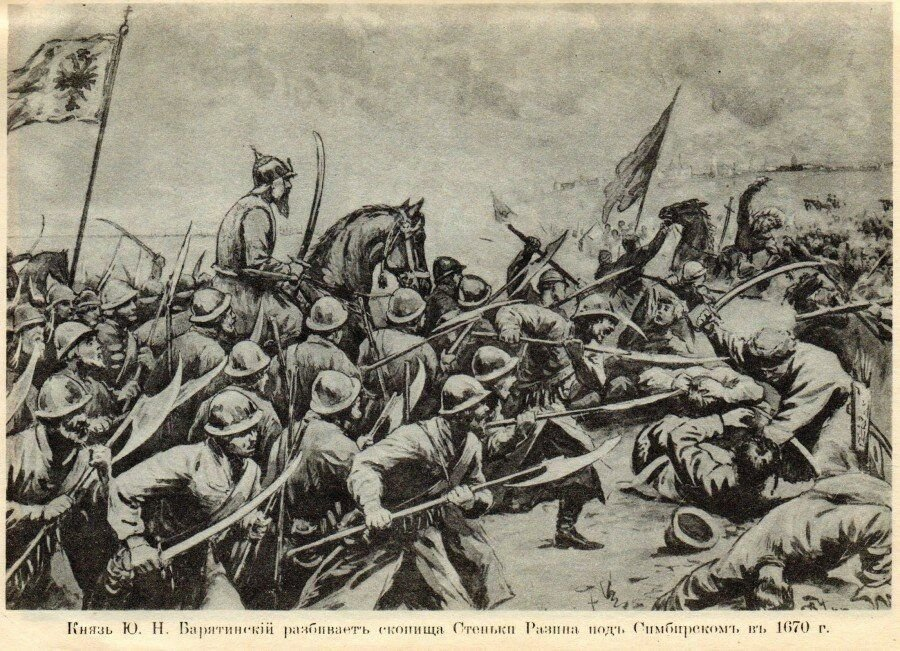
Battle of Simbirsk, 1670

Prince Yury Nikitich Baryatinsky (Russian: Ю́рий Ники́тич Баря́тинский; c. 1610 – 1685) was a Russian boyar and voyevoda from the Rurikid house of Baryatinsky.

== Biography ==
Yury Baryatinsky was born as a son of Nikita Petrovich Baryatinsky. He was born around 1610, but there are no records of the specific location. Until 1653, he made a military career and served in several cities before he was sent as a diplomat to Lithuania.

Following the start of the Russo-Polish War of 1654–1667, Baryatinsky was one of the military leaders on the Russian side. In 1654, in the battle of Szkłów, he defeated the Lithuanian army of Janusz Radziwill, which was twice as big as his detachment, thus helping the surrender of Smolensk. The next year, he served in the Novgorodian regiment of Semyon Urusov. In 1655, he was victorious near Borisov, and defeated the army of the Polish–Lithuanian Commonwealth in the battle of Brest.

In 1658, after a part of the Cossack leadership under Ivan Vyhovsky switched the sides and allied themselves with the Poles, Baryatinsky defeated the hetman's brother Konstantin Vyhovsky near Vasilkov. As a trophy, Baryatinsky captured the buława of Vyhovsky, which today is shown in the Kremlin Armoury in Moscow.

In 1659, Baryatinsky was appointed as the voyevoda of Kiev and as the right hand of Vasily Sheremetev, who commanded the Russian troops there. After Sheremetev left the city with his army, Baryatinsky became the commander of the city's garrison. Sheremetev capitulated after the battle of Chudnov and ordered Baryatinsky to withdraw from the ancient city, according to his new treaty with the Poles. However, Baryatinsky refused to do so, answering with historical words: "I only take orders from his Majesty, not from Sheremetev. There are many Sheremetevs in Moscow!".

Baryatinsky's action served as an example for the Russian garrisons of Pereyaslav, Chernigov and other cities. At the same time, discontent began to rise in the Polish army due to missing payments, leading to widespread desertion. Baryatinsky's determined action allowed to alleviate the consequences of the Chudniv battle and to keep a significant part of Ukraine unter Russian control until the end of the war.

In 1663, Baryatinsky received the title of okolnichy. In 1668, he repelled an assault by the Tatars from the Crimean Khanate on Ryazan.

In 1670 and 1671, he was one of the main suppressors of the revolt of Stenka Razin. As the commander of the governmental army, he soundly defeated the army of Razin in the battle of Simbirsk, which made Razin flee to the Don area. After 1671, Baryatinsky lived at the court in Moscow with the rank of boyar. In 1682, he supported the decree of the Zemsky Sobor that abolished mestnichestvo.

== Family ==
Baryatinsky had two sons: Yury and Fyodor.

== See also ==
- List of Russian princely families
- Alexander Vladimirovich Baryatinsky
- Aleksandr Baryatinsky
- Leonilla Bariatinskaya

== Sources ==
- "Барятинские князья" . Brockhaus and Efron Encyclopedic Dictionary (in Russian). 1906.
- Костомаров, Н. И. (1900). "Барятинский". Русский биографический словарь. Т. 2. — Алексинский — Бестужев-Рюмин. Русский биографический словарь. p. 549.
