= Vyezdnoye =

Vyezdnoye Выездно́е
- Urban-type settlement
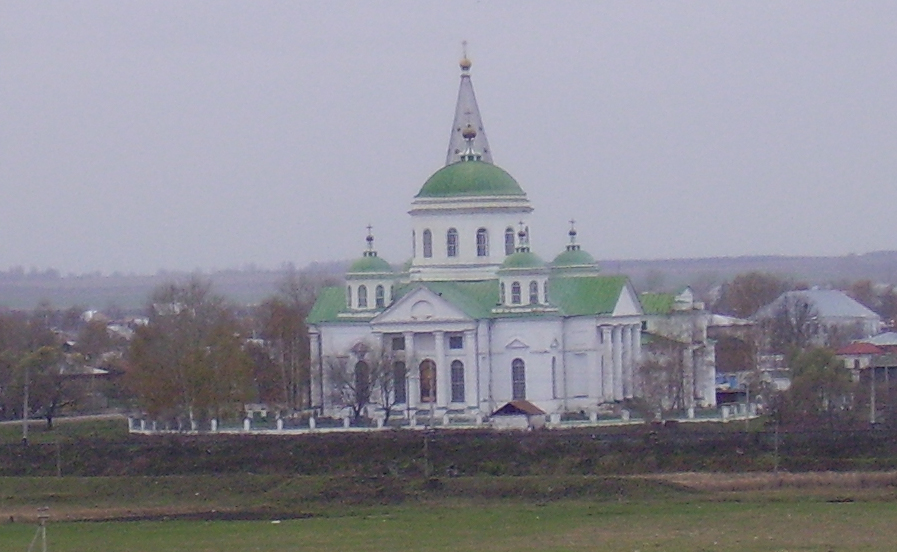
- Smolenskaya church
- Interactive map of Vyezdnoye
- Location of Vyezdnoye Vyezdnoye (Nizhny Novgorod Oblast)
- Coordinates: 55°22′45″N 43°47′31″E
- Country: Russia
- Federal subject: Nizhny Novgorod Oblast
- Administrative district: Arzamassky District

Population (2010 Census)
  - Total: 8,089
  - Estimate (2025): 7,683 (−5%)
- Time zone: UTC+3 (MSK)
- Postal code: 607247
- OKTMO ID: 22603155051

Vyezdnoye (Russian: Выездно́е) is an urban locality (a work settlement) in Arzamassky District of Nizhny Novgorod Oblast, Russia, located on the left (southwestern) bank of the Tyosha River, opposite the city of Arzamas, 115 kilometers (71 mi) south of Nizhny Novgorod. Population: 8,089 (2010 census); 7,992 (2002 census); 8,310 (1989 Soviet census).

== History ==
It was granted urban-type settlement status in 1982.
