= Farahabad, Mazandaran =

City in Mazandaran province, Iran

Coordinates: 36°47′30″N 53°06′35″E

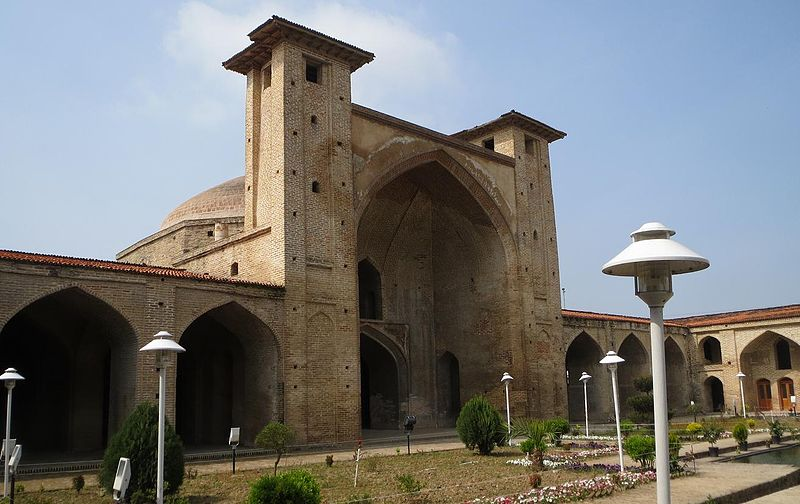
Safavid mosque at Farahabad

Farahabad (Persian: فرح‌آباد, lit. 'Abode of joy') was a palace and city built by Abbas the Great in Mazandaran province, Iran. It was built on a site formerly known as Tahan and linked to the town of Sari, 27 kilometres away, by a stone causeway. The shah used the city as his winter capital, and he died there in 1629.

Shah Abbas was fond of Mazandaran province, the birthplace of his mother Khayr al-Nisa Begum. Work began on the palace in 1611–12. Situated on top of a hill with a view of the Caspian Sea and the Alborz mountains, it was decorated with murals by Reza Abbasi and goldwork by a German craftsman, and surrounded by Persian gardens.

The city grew around the palace. In 1618, the Italian traveller Pietro della Valle visited Farahabad and compared the length of the walls to that of Rome or Constantinople. The population was made up of peoples resettled from other regions of the Safavid Empire. According to della Valle (who had spoken to the shah himself) they included 40,000 Armenian families, 12,000 Georgian families, 7,000 Jewish families and 25,000 Muslim families from the Caucasus. The Jewish merchants were given privileges similar to the Armenians in New Julfa, Isfahan. Abbas hoped they would help promote Iranian commerce, especially the silk and wine trades.

Abbas' successors neglected Farahabad. The climate in the summer was unhealthy and malarial. A large number of the immigrant residents died of epidemics, particularly malaria. Many Armenians and Georgians abandoned the city and returned to their native lands. In 1668, the Russian rebel cossacks led by Stenka Razin sacked Farahabad. Today little remains of the town. The main remains today are the restored main mosque, built to a similar ground plan as the Shah Mosque in Isfahan, the ruins of the royal palace and parts of a bridge over the Tajandrud river which belonged to the royal road connecting Isfahan with the palaces of the Caspian region.

Farahabad was also the name of a palace and gardens built by Soltan Hoseyn near Isfahan.
