= Where Are You My Brothers? =

Studio album by Dmitry Hvorostovsky
- Released: 2003
- Genre: war song, patriotic song
- Length: 41:03
- Label: Delos Productions; Kvadro-Disc
- Producer: Tatyana Vinnitskaya

Where are You, my Brothers? is a 2003 album of Russian-language songs from World War II recorded by baritone Dmitry Hvorostovsky and conductor Constantine Orbelian for Delos Productions. The album was released in Russia as Songs of the War Years (Песни военных лет). It was based on a concert at the Kremlin Palace in Moscow. A video of the concert and 13 of the songs was released on the American VAI label. The repertoire of the concert is the very core of the Russian war song genre and the sound and video releases were accompanied by booklet essays and sung texts and translations.

A follow-up concert on Red Square followed. The next year, 2005, Hvorostovsky took the programme on an official tour through Russia at the personal invitation of President Vladimir Putin. Hvorostovsky's tour repertoire also included songs not released on the CD including by Dmitri Shostakovich.

In Russia the album is known as Песни военных лет ("Pesni voennykh let").

== Track listing ==
No.	Title	Lyrics	Music	Length
1.	"Somewhere Far Away (Russian: Где-то далеко (Песня о далёкой родине), lit. 'Gde-To Daleko (Pesnya O Dalekoy Rodine)')"	Robert Rozhdestvensky	Mikael Tariverdiev	4:02
2.	"Dark Is the Night (Russian: Тёмная ночь, lit. 'Tiomnaia Noch')"	Vladimir Agatov ru	Nikita Bogoslovsky	3:34
3.	"Unexpected Waltz (Russian: Случайный вальс, lit. 'Slutchaynyy Val's')"	Evgeni Dolmatovski	Mark Fradkin	2:56
4.	"Where are you, my brothers? (Russian: Где же вы теперь, друзья-однополчане, lit. 'Gde zhe vy teper', druz'ya-odnopolchane')"	Aleksei Fatnyanov ru	Vasily Solovyov-Sedoi	3:40
5.	"On a Nameless Hill (Russian: На безымянной высоте, lit. 'Na Bezymiannoy Vysote')"	Mikhail Matusovsky	Veniamin Basner	4:22
6.	"The Roads (Russian: Дороги, lit. 'Dorogi')"	Lev Oshanin ru	Anatolii Novikov ru	4:51
7.	"Soldiers are Coming (Russian: Вот солдаты идут, lit. 'Vot Soldaty Idut')"	Mikhail Lvovskii ru	Kirill Molchanov	2:59
8.	"Cranes (Russian: Журавли, lit. 'Zhuravli')"	Rasul Gamzatov, transl. Naum Grebnev ru	Yan Frenkel	4:16
9.	"In the Trenches (Russian: В землянке, lit. 'V Zemlianke')"	Aleksei Surkov ru	Konstantin Listov	3:02
10.	"The Sacred Stone (Russian: Заветный камень, lit. 'Zavetnyy Kamen')"	Aleksander Zharov ru	Mikhail Matusovsky	4:36
11.	"Katyusha (Russian: Катюша)"	Mikhail Isakovskii ru	Matvey Blanter	2:14
12.	"Cossacks in Berlin (Russian: Казаки в Берлине, lit. 'Kazaki v Berline')"	Tsezar Solodar ru	Dmitry Pokrass, Daniil Pokrass ru	2:18
13.	"My Moscow (Russian: Моя Москва, lit. 'Moya Moskva')"	Mark Lisyanskii ru, Sergei Agranian ru	Isaak Dunayevsky	2:37
14.	"The Road to the Front (Russian: Дорожка фронтовая (песенка фронтового шофёра), lit. 'Dorozhka Frontovaia (Pesenka Frontovogo Shofiora)')"	Naum Labkovskii ru, Boris Laskin ru	Boris Mokrousov	2:17
15.	"On the Hills of Manchuria (Russian: На сопках Маньчжурии)"	Aleksei Mashistov ru	Ilia Shatrov	2:56
16.	"The Lonely Accordion (Russian: Одинокая гармонь, lit. 'Odinokaia Garmon'')"	Mikhail Isakovskii ru	Boris Mokrousov	3:08
17.	"The Last Battle (Russian: Последний бой, lit. 'Posledniy Boi')"	Mikhail Nozhkin	Mikhail Nozhkin	3:40

== DVD ==
Russian Songs from the War Years

- Soldiers Are Coming (K. Molchanov M. L’vovsky)
- Dark is the Night (N. Bogoslovsky V. Agatov)
- Unexpected Waltz (M. Fradkin Ye. Dolmatovsky)
- The Roads (A. Novikov L. Oshanin)
- On a Nameless Hill (V. Basner M. Matusovsky)
- Somewhere Far Away (M. Tariverdiev R. Rozhdestvensky)
- Katyusha (M. Blanter M. Isakovsky)
- The Hills of Manchuria (I. Shatrov A. Mashistov)
- The Sacred Stone (M. Matusovsky A. Zharov)
- The Lonely Accordion (B. Mokrousov M. Isakovsky)
- Cranes (Ya. Frenkel R. Gamzatov)
- The Last Battle (M. Nozhkin)
- My Moscow (I. Dunaevsky M. Lisiansky, S. Agaranian)

Concert Recorded at the State Kremlin Palace, Moscow on April 8, 2003. VAI.
