= I Met You, My Love =

Studio album by Dmitri Hvorostovsky
- Released: 2002
- Genre: Classical
- Label: Delos

I Met You, My Love is a 2002 album of 'Old Russian Romances', light-classical Russian songs by baritone Dmitri Hvorostovsky in arrangements for the recording by Evgeny Stetsyuk, with Moscow Chamber Orchestra, and Russian folk ensemble Style of Five, directed Constantine Orbelian. It is Hvorostovsky's only commercial recording of the popular salon songs he sometimes uses as encores in recitals in Russia. The album was very popular in Russia, but was generally not well received in the western classical press. The Gramophone's reviewer noted that the expertise of the singer could not elevate most of the songs to the Russian art song repertoire.

== Track listing ==
- Fyodor Ivanovich Tyutchev: Ya fstretil vas (I Met You, My Love)
- lyrics by Mikhail Lermontov: Net, ne tebia tak pilko ya liubliu (No, It's Not You I Love So Fervently)
- lyrics by B. Fomin: Tol'ko raz byvaet v zhizni vstrecha (Only once in your life could be the meeting)
- A. Shishkin: Noch svetla (Bright is the Night)
- Nikolai Listov: Ya pamniu val'sa zvuk prelestniy (I Remember the Charming Sound of the Waltz)
- Leonid Malashkin lyrics by G. Lishin: O, yesli b mog virazit' v zvuke (O, If Only I Could Express in Sounds)
- Pavel Petrovich Bulakhov: Ne probuzhday vospominaniy (Do Not Awaken Memories)
- Alexander Lvovich Gurilev: Pesn' yamshchika (The Coachman's Song)
- Pavel Petrovich Bulakhov: V pole shirokom (In the Wide Open Field)
- Alexander Lvovich Gurilev: Odnozvuchno gremit kolokol'chik (The Lonely Coach Bell Rings)
- Vladimir Abaza lyrics Ivan Turgenev: Utro tumannoye (Misty Morning)
- N. Lensky: No ya Vas fsio-taki liubliu (But I Love You, Nevertheless)
- Pavel Petrovich Bulakhov: Troyka mchitsa, troyka skachet (The Troika Speeds, the Troika Gallops)
- lyrics by Pugachov: Zhalobno stonet veter osenniy (The Autumn Wind Moans Mournfully)
- Evgeny Stetsyuk: V chas rokovoy (At That Fateful Hour)
- Boris Sheremetev (composer): Ya Vas liubil (I Loved You)
- A. Timofeyev: Dremliut plakuchiye ivi (The Weeping Willows Slumber)
- Alexander Lvovich Gurilev: Vam ne poniat' (You Cannot Understand)
- Pavel Petrovich Bulakhov: Gori, gori, moya zvezda (Shine, Shine, My Star)
