= Verkhospassky Cathedral =

Cathedral in Moscow, Russia

Cathedral of the Savior of the Holy Face
- Собо́р Спа́са Нерукотво́рного О́браза (Russian)
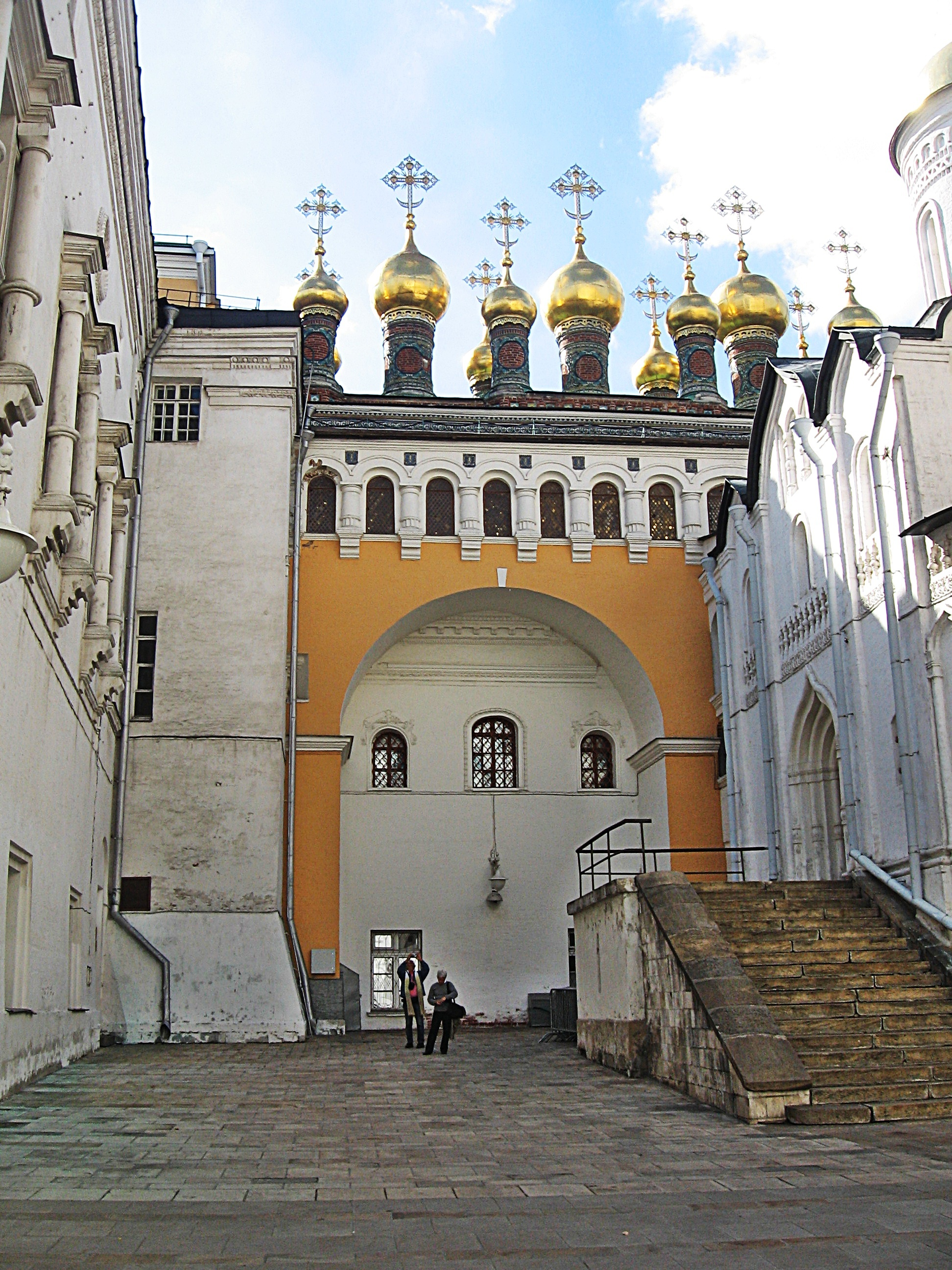

Religion
- Affiliation: Russian Orthodox
- Year consecrated: 1636

Location
- Location: Grand Kremlin Palace, Moscow, Russia
- Interactive map of Cathedral of the Savior of the Holy Face
- Coordinates: 55°45′02″N 37°36′58″E

Architecture
- Architect: Bazhen Ogurtsov
- Type: Church
- Groundbreaking: 1635

The Cathedral of the Savior of the Holy Face (Russian: Собо́р Спа́са Нерукотво́рного О́браза, romanized: Sobor Spasa Nerukotvornogo Obraza), commonly known as Verkhospassky Cathedral (Russian: Верхоспасский собор, romanized: Verkhospasskiy sobor), is an Orthodox church and the cathedral of the Grand Kremlin Palace. It was built from 1635 to 1636 by Bazhen Ogurtsov, Antip Konstantinov, Trefil Sharutin and Larion Ushakov. It is part of the complex of house churches of Russian tsars at the Terem Palace. The church is closed for free visits and services are not performed there.

== Terem Churches ==
Verkhospassky Cathedral is part of the complex of house churches at the Terem Palace. They end with eleven gilded domes, which are visible from the Cathedral Square to the right of the Palace of Facets. On the ground floor of the building is the church of St. Catherine, above it is the Church of the Resurrection of the Word. Five northern domes belong to these temples. At the level of the second floor is the Verkhospassky Cathedral, which includes five southern domes. Church of the Crucifixion of Christ (Exaltation of the Holy Cross) belongs to the central chapter.

The Church of the Great Martyr Catherine is located in the second tier of the Terem Palace opposite the Tsarina's Golden Chamber. It was built in 1627 by Englishman John Thaler on the site of a burnt wooden church. It was restored after the Trinity fire in 1737, when only a few icons of the lower tier of the iconostasis were preserved. In 1843, according to the project of Dmitry Chichagov, the interior was completely redesigned, the new iconostasis was made by Fedor Solntsev.

The Church of the Martyr Evdokia was built over St. Catherine Church in 1654, in 1681 it was re-consecrated in honor of the Resurrection of the Word. It is located at the level of the Verkhospassky Cathedral, to the north of it. The Church of the Crucifixion of Christ was built over the Ioannovsky chapel of the Verkhospassky Cathedral between 1679 and 1681.

== Sources ==
- Вострышев М., Шокарев С. (2011). Вся Москва от А до Я. Энциклопедия. М.: Алгоритм. ISBN 978-5-4320-0001-9.
- Kondratyev, I. (1910). Московский кремль, святыни и достопамятности : историческое описание соборов, церквей и монастырей [The Moscow Kremlin: Shrines and Landmarks — A Historical Description] (in Russian). Moscow: I. A. Morozov.
- Yudakov, I. (2013). Московский Кремль. Красная площадь. Путеводитель: Сокровища. Дворцы Святые реликвии. Соборы. Музеи. Схемы. Экскурсии. История [The Moscow Kremlin. Red Square. Guidebook: Treasures. Palaces. Holy Relics. Cathedrals. Museums. Maps. Tours. History] (in Russian). Moscow: Igor Yudakov.
