= Mark Abel =

American composer of classical music

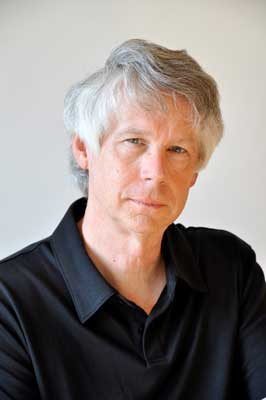
- Mark Abel, composer
- Born: Mark Abel; April 28, 1948 (age 78); Hartford, Connecticut, U.S.
- Occupation: Composer
- Years active: 1999-present
- Known for: The Palm Trees Are Restless
- Style: Classical Music
- Website: www.markabelmusic.com

Mark Abel (born April 28, 1948) is an American composer of classical music.

== Background ==
After a brief stay at Stanford University in the late 1960s, Abel was active on the New York rock scene during the 1970s and early 1980s, leading his own groups, producing the bands The Feelies and The Bongos, and playing on albums of Tom Verlaine and former Left Banke mastermind Michael Brown. He returned to California in 1983 and worked in mainstream journalism for two decades, eventually becoming foreign editor of the San Francisco Chronicle. He moved away from rock during that period, immersed himself in classical and gradually began developing his hybridized style.

== Career ==
Nine albums of Abel's music have appeared since 2006. The self-released Journey Long, Journey Far and Songs of Life, Love and Death attracted little notice. But The Dream Gallery, a 69-minute song cycle for seven soloists and chamber orchestra depicting the lives of imaginary archetypal Californians, caught the interest of pianist Carol Rosenberger, director of the Delos Productions label, leading to its recording by USC Thornton conductor Sharon Lavery and the La Brea Sinfonietta.

Delos’ release of Gallery in early 2012 began to bring Abel's music to a wider audience. The record garnered considerable acclaim, with notices ranging from “profound and compelling” and “not much like anything else out there, … most highly recommended” to “anyone who is interested in modern vocal music will want to own this disc.”

In the fall of 2013, Abel's “The Benediction” appeared on Stopping By, the debut CD of New York tenor Kyle Bielfield. The song explores Abel's feelings about the uneasy state of socially divided America.

Abel's second recording for Delos, Terrain of the Heart, a collection of art song cycles for voice and piano, was released in February 2014. It features three recitalists from the Los Angeles classical scene — sopranos Jamie Chamberlin and Ariel Pisturino, and pianist Victoria Kirsch.

The record was praised as "art song at a high-water mark of invention" and for its "emotional directness and stylistic unpredictability." The Journal of Singing called "The Dark-Eyed Chameleon" cycle "captivating and important," adding that it "holds its own" with some of the most revered tragic cycles of Schubert, Schumann and Mahler.

In March 2016, Delos Productions released the double-CD package Home Is A Harbor — consisting of Abel's first opera (of the same name) and the song cycle "The Palm Trees are Restless", a setting of verses by Los Angeles poet Kate Gale. The cycle marked the beginning of a series of collaborations by Abel with Grammy-winning soprano Hila Plitmann.

Gramophone (magazine) commented “Abel employs a colorful blend of styles … (that) serve the emotional nature of each work to bracing and poignant effect. Abel’s lucid narrative and vibrant vocal lines, combined with telling orchestrations for a chamber ensemble, make (“Harbor”) an affecting experience. The brilliant soprano Hila Plitmann manages every leap and switch of emotional gears (in “Palm Trees”) with fearless commitment, and pianist Tali Tadmor matches her in power and subtlety.”

Richard Sininger of American Record Guide wrote that the recording showed Abel to be “at the forefront of (California's) musical life.”

Plitmann and Tadmor gave the world premiere of “The Palm Trees Are Restless” on Oct. 1, 2016, at the Boston Court Performing Arts Center in Pasadena, Ca. Plitmann has continued her support of Abel's music since then, premiering another Abel-Gale collaboration, the concert aria “Those Who Loved Medusa,” at a Dec. 10, 2017, concert at The Broad Stage in Santa Monica. Several months later, Plitmann was featured in a film dramatization of “Medusa” made by videographer Tempe Hale.

Plitmann recorded that piece and two other Abel works – “In the Rear View Mirror, Now” and “The Benediction” – for the composer's fourth Delos release, Time and Distance, which appeared in March 2018. The album also includes two pieces written for mezzo-soprano Janelle DeStefano – the song cycle “The Ocean of Forgiveness,” a setting of poems by Joanne Regenhardt, and “The Invocation.” The “Ocean” cycle took the Honorable Mention in the 2018 Art Song Competition held by the National Association of Teachers of Singing.

Time and Distance was well received by music writers. Laurence Vittes of Gramophone praised Abel's “marriages of subtly charged music with an eclectic modernist twist to emotionally provocative, introspective texts.” Gregory Berg of The Journal of Singing called Abel “a composer with bold and ambitious ideas and the resourcefulness to nearly always bring those ideas to full and effective fruition. His latest collection … marks a new level of excellence we have not seen before.”

Theodore Bell of CultureSpot LA wrote: “The collection has a unique L.A. sound and attitude … . Abel’s settings fuse chamber and contemporary styles seamlessly together to achieve a spacious feel with only a small ensemble.” Huntley Dent of Fanfare observed: “Few current songwriters rival Abel’s intriguing texts and their reach into so many psychological and cultural issues. Meaning and melody go hand in hand in a very contemporary way, which I truly admire.”

Abel shifted focus for his fifth Delos release, The Cave of Wondrous Voice, offering a program dominated by chamber music. Three American masters of the idiom – David Shifrin, Fred Sherry, and Carol Rosenberger – introduce Abel’s Clarinet Trio and “Intuition’s Dance,” while German violinist Sabrina-Vivian Höpcker and young American pianist Dominic Cheli perform “The Elastic Hours.” Hila Plitmann makes her fifth traversal of an Abel work in the song cycle “Four Poems of Marina Tsvetaeva,” accompanied by Rosenberger and English hornist Sarah Beck. The piece is the first setting of the Russian poet in English, with translations by Alyssa Dinega Gillespie.

Like its predecessors, Cave received wide acclaim. Beyond Criticism's Matthew Gurewitsch described the album as “sundown music, aglow with somber color and orientalist touches. Serendipity and an Impressionist sensibility … guide the ebb and flow. Beautiful.” Henry Schlinger of Culture Spot LA called the release “a wondrous creation” in which Abel “announced his arrival as a serious chamber music composer.” The Whole Note's Tiina Kiik wrote that Cave showed Abel to be “a compositional master of intriguing contemporary music.”

Gramophone's Donald Rosenberg praised Abel's “establishing of vibrant and urgent contexts for the interaction of voice and instruments,” and the Clarinet Trio's “poetic, engaging and philosophical material that these superb players afford colorful and lyrical delineation.” Fanfare's Huntley Dent declared: “Abel represents the best strain in contemporary American composers who can merge their musical gifts with a sensitive, far-reaching intellect. He brings up to date the strain of literary delving found in Schumann and Debussy.”

In fall 2021, Abel's duo composition Approaching Autumn appeared on a Delos album of the same name by San Francisco-based cellist Jonah Kim. The piece, performed with pianist Robert Koenig, was labeled “compelling” by Lou Fancher of San Francisco Classical Voice. Lynn René Bayley of The Art Music Lounge called it “a surprisingly dramatic piece … the work of an assured composer who knows what he is about. Not a single phrase or note is superfluous, repetitive, or just thrown in to impress the listener. … A work that I consider a modern American masterpiece.”

David W. Moore of the American Record Guide called Approaching Autumn "beautifully romantic" and Fanfare's Colin Clarke hailed it as “a splendid piece, nearly a quarter-hour of pure beauty.” Rafael de Acha of All About the Arts described it as “melodically forthcoming, harmoniously laid-out, often playful, eminently accessible, at times ruminative, unabashedly joyful at others. … A delightful work.”

October 2022 saw the release of Spectrum, a 92-minute survey evenly divided between vocal and chamber pieces. Soprano Isabel Bayrakdarian and mezzo Kindra Scharich make their first appearances on an Abel album, while Hila Plitmann returns for her sixth. Instrumental players include Carol Rosenberger, Dominic Cheli, David Samuel, Jonah Kim, Dennis Kim, Sean Kennard, Jeff Garza, Jeffrey LaDeur and Christy Kim.

Spectrum drew praise from various corners of the music media. Textura’s Ron Schepper: “Abel is beholden to no school in the writing department, and neither are there discernible influences, even if his music sits comfortably within the classical tradition ... . He is, as it were, his own man, a composer who brings his sensibility and highly developed command of craft to a particular idea and illuminates it in strikingly imaginative manner.”

Arlo McKinnon of Opera News agreed: “Abel has developed a very personal style, based equally on rock and classical music. The music is tonal yet not closely tied to standard harmonic practices.” He added: “Trois Femmes du Cinéma” is beautifully performed by Isabel Bayrakdarian and Carol Rosenberger. ... The music of “1966” is vividly dramatic and poignant. ... The most intriguing piece consists of two scenes from “The Book of Esther,” which I hope will be completed and heard.”

Gregory Berg of The Journal of Singing said: “He is a composer who has a lot to say and has some very intriguing ways of saying it. ... Everything here is deeply engaging and unfailingly fresh.” Berg’s JOS colleague Kathleen Roland-Silverstein described Abel as “a gifted and fascinating composer” and praised “Trois Femmes du Cinéma” as “commanding and disquieting, ... gorgeous and complex songs ... a welcome addition to a body of repertoire that serves to advance women’s voices.”

Fanfare’s Henry Fogel wrote of the song cycle “1966”: “This is music of nostalgia and recollection, ... evocative, with a wistful beauty underlying much of it. The performance (by Kindra Scharich and Jeffrey LaDeur) is all a composer could ask for.”

Abel’s record company home, Delos, was acquired in late 2023 by the Europe-based label family Outhere Music. His productivity has continued under the new ownership and the album 4.4.2 was released in February 2026. Featured in four duo compositions are flutist Alice K. Dade, violinist Jennifer Choi, cellist Jonah Kim, pianist Keisuke Nakagoshi, Lithuanian pianist Ieva Jokubaviciute, and two leading Canadian musicians, mezzo-soprano Simone McIntosh and pianist Michael McMahon.

Textura’s Ron Schepper hailed Abel’s ability to “wholly engage listeners with no compromise to himself or the integrity of his work. ... He's as capable of beguiling with an emotionally gripping song cycle as he is an adventurous instrumental excursion.” Schepper said As the World Turns “impresses as a great candidate for the art song repertoire that vocal-and-piano duos would be wise to consider adding.”

Henry Schlinger of CultureSpot LA wrote: “Abel has once again shown why he is that rare contemporary composer, writing accessible music full of melodic lyricism woven into an intimate fabric of exploration.” He praised McIntosh for singing “gloriously,” the unusual violin-organ work Symbiotica as sounding as though the instruments “have always been played together,” and for that piece’s “extraordinary violin part performed exquisitely by Jennifer Choi.”

Dirk Schauss of Online Merker: “4.4.2 finds Mark Abel at the height of his creative powers: the works are melodically generous and emotionally direct, without ever slipping into the banal or the derivative. The consistent duo instrumentation ensures maximum transparency and compels the performers to maintain a heightened communicative presence—a quality that all the artists gathered here impressively deliver.”

Gramophone’s Pwyll ap Siön called As the World Turns “personal and powerful,” adding: “the composer's instrumental music gains much from being untethered to words, thoughts, concrete ideas and images.” He described A Door Opens for cello and piano “textbook Abel, Iyrical moments foregrounding sweeping cello lines are contrasted with animated rhythmic passages full of astringent chromaticism.”

== Awards ==
- Global Music Awards - "Award of Excellence" for the lyrics in The Dream Gallery
- Global Music Awards - "Award of Merit" for "creativity/originality"

== Discography ==
- 4.4.2 (2026)
- Spectrum (2022)
- The Cave of Wondrous Voice (2020)
- Time and Distance (2018)
- Home Is A Harbor (2016)
- Terrain of the Heart (2014)
- The Dream Gallery (2012)
- Journey Long, Journey Far (2008)
- Songs of Life, Love and Death (2006)
