= Roads (Red Army Choir song) =

1945 Soviet song

"The Roads" («Дороги»), also known by its incipit "Oh, the Roads…" («Эх, дороги…»), is a Soviet World War II song, composed by Anatoly Novikov to lyrics by the poet Lev Ivanovich Oshanin. The song is one of the best-known works of the composer, having been popularised by both ensembles carrying the name of the Red Army Choir, namely the Alexandrov Ensemble and MVD Ensemble. Novikov and Oshanin were members of a military troupe at the front and the song was composed under artillery fire at Zhizdra. Among those who have recorded the song are Muslim Magomayev, Ivan Rebroff (1986), Dmitri Hvorostovsky on the war songs album Where Are You My Brothers, and the Choir of Sretensky Monastery.

This song is not to be confused with another Red Army Choir song "Na doroge" ("On the Road") or "Gey, po doroge!" ("Hey, on the Road!").

== Lyrics ==
Russian original

Cyrillic script

Припев:
Эх, дороги…
Пыль да туман,
Холода, тревоги
Да степной бурьян.

I
Знать не можешь
Доли своей,
Может, крылья сложишь
Посреди степей.

Вьётся пыль под сапогами
степями, полями.
А кругом бушует пламя
Да пули свистят.

Припев

II
Выстрел грянет,
Ворон кружит:
Твой дружок в бурьяне
Неживой лежит…

А дорога дальше мчится,
пылится, клубится,
А кругом земля дымится
Чужая земля.

Припев

III
Край сосновый.
Солнце встает.
У крыльца родного
Мать сыночка ждет.

И бескрайними путями,
степями, полями.
Всё глядят вослед за нами
Родные глаза.

Припев

IV
Снег ли, ветер, –
Вспомним, друзья!
Нам дороги эти
Позабыть нельзя.

Latin script

Pripev:
Eh, dorogi…
Pylj da tuman,
Holoda, trevogi
Da stepnoj burjjan.

I
Znatj ne možešj
Doli svojej,
Možet, kryljja složišj
Posredi stepej.

Bjjotsja pylj pod sapogami
stepjami, poljami.
A krugom bušujet plamja
Da puli svistjat.

Pripev

II
Vystrel grjanet,
Voron kružit:
Tvoj družok v burjjane
Neživoj ležit…

A doroga daljše mčitsja,
pylitsja, klubitsja,
A krugom zemlja dymitsja
Čužaja zemlja.

Pripev

III
Kraj sosnovyj.
Solnce vstajet.
U kryljca rodnovo
Matj synočka ždjot.

I beskrajnimi putjami,
stepjami, poljami.
Vsjo gljadjat vosled za nami
Rodnyje glaza.

Pripev

IV
Sneg li, veter, –
Vspomnim, druzjja!
Nam dorogi eti
Pozabytj neljzja.

English translation

Chorus:
Oh, the roads…
The dust and mist,
The cold and bitterness
And wild steppe grass.

I
You cannot know
Your own fate,
Perhaps you'll fold your wings
Girt by the steppes.

Dust swirls under the boots
In the steppes and fields.
And flames rage all around
And the bullets whine.

Chorus

II
A shot will burst,
A raven circles:
Your friend in the weeds
Lies lifeless…

But the road rushes on and on,
Gathering dust, swirling
The land fumes all around
A foreign land.

Chorus

III
In pinewood land
The sun rises.
On the porch of her own
A mom for her son waits.

And along endless paths
The steppes and fields,
Everybody looks after us
With their own eyes.

Chorus

IV
Be it snow or wind, –
Remember, friends!
We just cannot forget
These very roads.

== Charts ==
=== Dmitri Hvorostovsky version ===
2025 weekly chart performance for "Ekh, dorogi..."
Chart (2025)	Peak position
Russia Streaming (TopHit)	88

2026 weekly chart performance for "Ekh, dorogi..."
Chart (2026)	Peak position
Russia Streaming (TopHit)	93
