= Accidental Waltz (song) =

Song
- Language: Russian
- Released: 1943
- Genre: Song
- Composer: Mark Fradkin
- Lyricist: Yevgeny Dolmatovsky

Accidental Waltz is a popular Russian song by composer Mark Fradkin with lyrics by Yevgeny Dolmatovsky, created in 1943. An earlier version of the song was also famous under the name "Officer’s Waltz".

== Lyrics ==
The English translation of Yevgeny Dolmatovsky's lyrics are as follows:

The night is short

The clouds are asleep

Your unfamiliar hand is laying on my palm

After the troubles

Sleeps the little town

I heard the melody of the waltz

And stopped here for a little while

Though I don't know you at all

And far from here is my home

I feel as though

I am home again

In this empty room,

We dance together,

So say something...

I don't know what

== History ==
In February 1942, the poet Yevgeny Dolmatovsky published a poem under the name "Dances until the Morning" in the newspaper of the South-Western Front Red Army, in which there were the following words: "dance the eternal chase / surprisingly easy, / lay in my palms / unfamiliar hands …". Recalling the story of the creation of this poem, Dolmatovsky said: “Should a military convoy stop for the night in a frontline village or town, already there are acquaintances, and frank conversations, and falling in love, and all this is of a sad and chaste character; and early, early - parting, departure...”.

In December 1942, in the Stalingrad region, Dolmatovsky met with the composer Mark Fradkin, with whom he had previously created "Song of the Dnieper". According to Dolmatovsky’s story, shortly after he read Fradkin’s poem "Dances until the Morning", he "on the trophy accordion... he played... a waltz melody, inspired by, as he said, this poem". Nevertheless, the writing of the lyrics for the new song had to be postponed – the Stalingrad Operation was ending, and battle songs were needed to raise the spirit of the Soviet troops. During this period, Fradkin and Dolmatovsky wrote the song "We have Stalingrad", "Ring" and others.

After the battle of Stalingrad in 1943, Dolmatovsky and Fradkin were invited to the Donsk front, for a war council hearing where they were awarded the order of the Red Star. When the commander of the front, Konstantin Rokossovsky, asked him about any commemorative ideas he may have, Dolmatovsky described to him his idea of a song inspired by the poem "Dances until the Morning" (Tanzi do Utra). The political leader of the front, Sergei Galadzhev, was also at the meeting and suggested that the song should resemble an officer’s waltz. The name "Officer’s Waltz" (Offitsersky Vals) appealed to Dolmatovsky. The next day, Dolmatovsky and Fradkin were on a train headed for the north in a carriage designated for political administrators. The train was slow with stops along the way; the journey from Stalingrad to Yeltsa took seven days. In this time, the song "Officer’s Waltz" (Offitsersky Vals) was created.

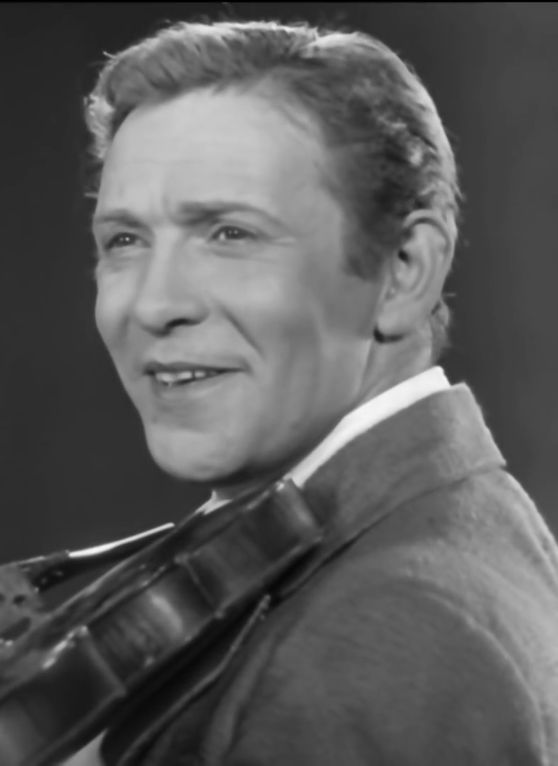
First performer of the song, Leonid Utyosov

Yevgeny Dolmatovsky recounted that the song was based on the story of Vasily Vasilyev, a pilot. One night in a frontline village, Vasily heard the sound of music. Approaching the noise, he saw young people dancing, and a girl called Zina standing by herself on the side. He introduced himself and invited her to waltz. But soon they had to say goodbye, as Vasily had to leave. Vasily told Fradkin, "Composers like you create songs. I have a request: write one about my story. If you describe everything accurately, Zina will understand that it’s about me and her. Maybe, she will hear it and contact me." And sure enough, after some time Zina wrote a letter to the radio station, in which she asked for the pilot’s address. Fradkin recalled, "We got in contact with the air force base where the lieutenant served, but Vasily couldn’t answer Zina; he died the death of a hero in an aerial battle..."

Officer's Waltz was first performed by Leonid Utyosov, later receiving the name Accidental Waltz. The song quickly gained popularity – many Russian artists who performed in front of soldiers during World War II had the song in their repertoire. From the very beginning, the lyrics of the song were subjected to criticism. When Utyosov first recorded the song, censors allowed only one original verse, and the other was removed with the following argument: "Where is this coming from? An officer arrives in an unfamiliar house, he dances with an unfamiliar woman, speaks without knowing what about, and feels like he is at home!". The change in name of the song could have been linked with the fact that the song "cast a shadow" on the Soviet officer, and in early versions one of the lines was written differently: "And on my shoulder lies / Your unfamiliar hand". Furthermore, according to one version, the name and the lyrics were changed at the request of Joseph Stalin, who after hearing the song asked, "How can a fragile woman reach the shoulders of a military officer? He is a giant. Do you want to humiliate our army? And why have you called the waltz Officer’s? Officers should fight, and not dance". As a result of these controversies, after the end of the war, in the autumn of 1946, further replication and official performance of the song was banned, with the ban lasting until the Khrushchev Thaw.

The song "Accidental Waltz" (Sluchainy vals) by Leonid Utyosov can be heard in the films: "The First Day of Peace" (Perviy den mira, 1959) by Yakov Segel, "Mirror for a Hero" (Zerkelo dlya geroya, 1987) by Vladimir Khotinenko, as well as the film "Room and a Half", (Polotori komnati, ili sentimentalnoye puteshestviye domoi, 2009) by Andrei Khrzhanovsky. The tune of this song appears in Evgeny Tsiganov’s short story "Accidental Waltz" (2010), which was used in a series of short films aired on the programme "9th May: Personal relationships" (Devyatoya maya: Lichnoye otnosheniye).

== Performers ==
During its history "Accidental Waltz" was included in the repertoire of many famous singers, such as Leonid Utesov, Efraim Flax, Alexey Pokrovsky, Valentina Tolkunova, Renat Ibrahimov, Sergey Zakharov, Evgeny Belyaev, Eduard Khil, Joseph Kobzon, Lyudmila Gurchenko, Dmitry Hvorostovsky, Oleg Pogudin, and others. The song was also performed by groups So-called Accident, Proletarian Tango, and Uma2rman.
