= Leonid Malashkin =

Russian composer and conductor

Leonid Dimitrievitch Malashkin (1842 – February 11, 1902) was a Russian composer and conductor. Though he wrote a few works in larger forms, he is today chiefly remembered for his romances, particularly "Oh, Could I But Express in Song".

Little is recorded of Malashkin's career; born in Moscow, he received his musical training abroad, and in 1870 began teaching voice at the Kiev Theological Seminary. He appears to have been primarily a composer of Russian Orthodox liturgical music, of pieces for piano, and of songs. Among his larger-format works were several symphonies, including at least two on folk themes and one titled the "Triumphant"; the latter, along with one of the folk symphonies and a collection of songs, was performed at an all-Malashkin concert at the Hall of the Assembly of the Nobility in Saint Petersburg in 1873. The same program was repeated in Moscow during the same concert season. In both cases, the composer conducted, with tenor Fyodor Nikolsky and mezzo-soprano Aleksandra Krutikova as soloists. Neither of the concerts was successful, with Pyotr Ilyich Tchaikovsky (in his capacity as a music critic) writing:

So far Mr Malashkin's attempts at composing are no more than a harmless passion, but if nothing is done to hinder the development of this passion, then God alone knows what lamentable consequences lie in store for this misguided lover of musical composition. The point is that, in spite of Mr Malashkin's quite amazing lack of talent, he is evidently working hard on perfecting his imaginary abilities as a composer, for in his dreary and aimless musical outpourings one can nevertheless see a certain schooling and theoretical knowledge.

Malashkin wrote one opera, on the subject of Ilya Muromets; this was premiered in Kiev in 1879, but was also not held to be a success. He also collected and arranged folk songs, and published a collection of songs from Ukraine in the 1890s.

Malashkin is remembered today for a single romance, "Oh, Could I But Express in Song" - sometimes translated as "O, Could I in Song Tell My Sorrow" - which was at one time greatly popular; it has been recorded by singers as diverse as Alexander Kipnis, Feodor Chaliapin, and John McCormack. It is at least as famous as the subject of an oft-retold apocryphal tale. The most popular version of the story claims that a customer has telephoned a music store with a request for the sheet music of the song in question. The clerk, having written it down, proceeds to perform a fruitless inventory search for Kodály's "Buttocks-Pressing Song". Other versions of the story ascribe the misunderstanding to a radio announcer.

Another popular romance, oft erroneously labelled as a folk song, was also composed by Malashkin, in 1881: "Я встретил Вас", "I met you", with words by Fyodor Tyutchev. Among others, Boris Shtokolov and Dmitri Hvorostovsky have both recorded this song.

Malashkin died in Moscow in 1902.

== Contemporary use ==
The German artist duo KünstlerTandem DuWieDubist utilized the melody of "Ya vstretil vas" in a spoken-word performance of the text "Wenn Sie mich fragen" by Hans Peter Siebenhaar. The piece, a prose transcript of a former Wehrmacht soldier reflecting on the war, is juxtaposed with Malashkin's Russian romance to create a deliberate artistic contrast.
