= Carol Rosenberger =

American musician and academic

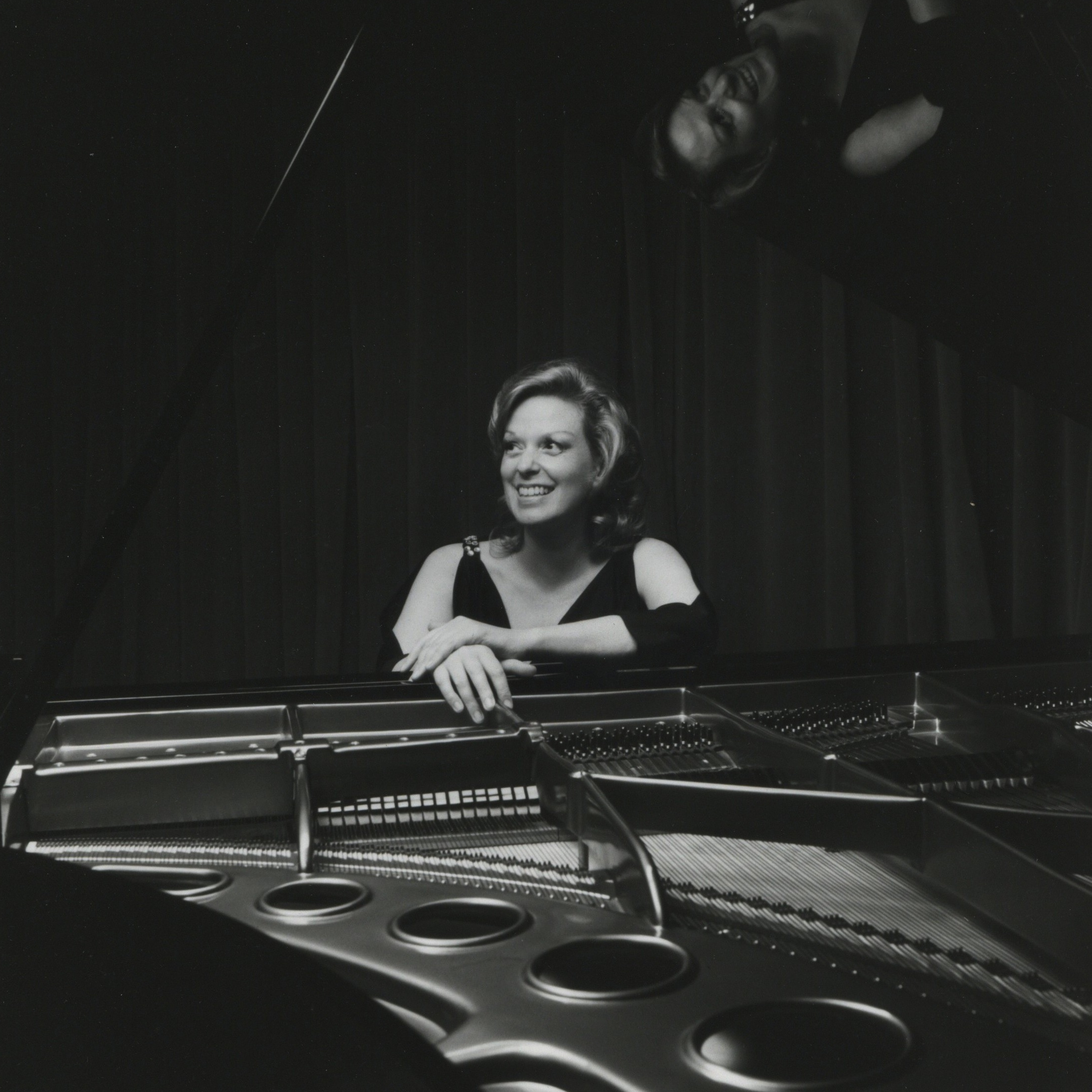
- Born: 1933 (age 92–93)
- Occupation: Classical pianist

Carol Rosenberger (born 1933) is a classical pianist. In 1976, Rosenberger was chosen to represent America's women concert artists by the President's National Commission on the Observance of International Women's Year. She has given performance workshops for young musicians on campuses nationwide. Rosenberger recorded over 30 albums on the Delos Productions recording label. Rosenberger's memoir, To Play Again: A Memoir of Musical Survival, was published in 2018 by She Writes Press.

== Life ==
Born in Detroit, Michigan, Rosenberger studied in the U.S. with Webster Aitken and Katja Andy; in Paris with the legendary Nadia Boulanger; and in Vienna with the harpsichordist and Baroque scholar Eta Harich-Schneider and the Schenker theorist Franz Eibner. She has been the subject of articles in many of the nation's leading newspapers and magazines, and in 1976 was chosen to represent America's women concert artists by the President's National Commission on the Observance of International Women's Year. She has been on the faculties of the University of Southern California, California State University Northridge and Immaculate Heart College. She has given performance workshops for young musicians on campuses nationwide.

Rosenberger has given numerous benefit performances for physical rehabilitation programs, an effort motivated by her own experience. Her official debut was delayed ten years by an attack of paralytic polio at the outset of her career. The disease damaged most severely the very muscles needed for piano playing. Rosenberger spent those ten years of seclusion and rehabilitation partly in Vienna, studying Baroque style and theory at the Academy and absorbing German lieder, opera, instrumental music and literature.

Between the late 1960s and the early 1980s, Rosenberger was a member of the piano faculties of the University of Southern California, Immaculate Heart College, and California State University, Northridge. At USC she taught a workshop for instrumentalists and vocalists entitled "Preparation for Performance", which drew upon the techniques she had developed to rehabilitate her own playing from the after-effects of paralytic polio. On her concert tours throughout the U.S., she often included piano workshops while performing at universities.

After making a number of recordings for Delos, Rosenberger became interested in classical recording production and began co-producing recordings with Delos founder Amelia Haygood. The Delos Recordings for Young People series was a result of this partnership.

Since the death of Amelia Haygood in 2007, Rosenberger has taken on a larger responsibility for the label and is now its director.

== Concert history ==
Rosenberger's debut tour in 1970 received enthusiastic reviews from cities like New York City, Boston, London, Paris, Vienna, Berlin and other capitals. Rosenberger's recital programs and guest appearances with orchestras have carried her to most major European and American cities. She has been guest soloist with the Royal Philharmonic Orchestra, London Symphony Orchestra, English Chamber Orchestra, Scottish Chamber Orchestra, Orchestre Philharmonique de Monte Carlo, Moscow Chamber Orchestra, New York Chamber Symphony, National Symphony, Los Angeles Chamber Orchestra, Seattle Symphony, Houston Symphony, Detroit Symphony Orchestra, and Indianapolis Symphony Orchestra; performing with conductors Gerard Schwarz, James DePreist, Constantine Orbelian, Neville Marriner, Rafael Frühbeck de Burgos, and Izler Solomon, among others.

== Recording history ==
Over 30 recordings on the Delos label encompassed a wide range of piano repertoire. Her recording of Howard Hanson's Fantasy Variations on a Theme of Youth, with Gerard Schwarz and the New York Chamber Symphony brought her a 1991 Grammy nomination for Best Performance, Soloist with Orchestra. Rosenberger and Schwarz followed this recording with the rarely heard Hanson Piano Concerto with the Seattle Symphony. Together with Constantine Orbelian and the Moscow Chamber Orchestra, Rosenberger recorded the premiere of Frank Bridge's Chamber Concerto for Piano and String Orchestra (arr. C. Orbelian), an arrangement of the Quintet (1912).

Rosenberger's celebrated series of concept-recordings began with Water Music of the Impressionists, which was selected by Stereo Review as one of the "25 Best Classical Compact Discs of all time", by Gramophone as a Recording of the Year, and by Billboard as an All-time Great Recording. Night Moods was the successful sequel, and a second water-music disc, Singing on the Water, included barcarolles written especially for the album by Sir Richard Rodney Bennett and David Diamond.

Together with label founder and co-producer Amelia Haygood, Rosenberger led the way into another area of concept recordings with the 1989 release of her Perchance to Dream: A Lullaby Album for Children and Adults, which was one of the first classical CDs designed primarily for young people.

Together with Haygood, Rosenberger co-produced the Music for Young People Series. As producer of special recording projects combining music and narration, Rosenberger has worked with such narrators as James Earl Jones, Michael York and Natalia Makarova. She also wrote the script for Makarova's narrated version of Stravinsky's The Firebird, a recording that won the American Library Association's "Notable Recording" award.

== Discography ==
Rosenberger's recordings (all on Delos)

Concerto solo with orchestra

- Strauss: Burlesk; Hanson: Piano Concerto; Hanson: Variations on a Theme of Youth; others ("Carol's Concerto Collection") • Gerard Schwarz, conductor; Seattle Symphony/New York Chamber Symphony • Delos DE 3306
- Bridge: Chamber Concerto arr. Orbelian • Constantine Orbelian, conductor; Moscow Chamber Orchestra • Delos DE 3263
- Hindemith: Four Temperaments • James DePreist, conductor; Royal Philharmonic Orchestra • Delos DE 1006
- Falla: Nights in the Gardens of Spain • Gerard Schwarz, conductor; London Symphony Orchestra • Delos DE 3060
- Shostakovich: Piano Concerto #1 • Gerard Schwarz, conductor; Los Angeles Chamber Orchestra • Delos DE 3021
- Beethoven: Piano Concerto #4 • Gerard Schwarz, conductor; London Symphony Orchestra • Delos DE 3027
- Haydn: Piano Concerto #2 • Gerard Schwarz, conductor; Scottish Chamber Orchestra • Delos DE 3061
- Haydn: Piano Concerto #5 • Gerard Schwarz, conductor; Scottish Chamber Orchestra • Delos DE 3064
- Ravel: Piano Concerto, Adagio ("A French Romance") James DePreist, conductor; Orchestre Philharmonique de Monte-Carlo • Delos DE 3202
- Mozart Adagios (from Piano Concertos K. 595, K. 488, K. 491) • Constantine Orbelian, conductor; Moscow Chamber Orchestra • Delos DE 3243

Piano solo

- Water Music of the Impressionists (Debussy, Ravel, Liszt) • Delos DE 3006
- Beethoven: Piano Sonatas: Op. 57; Op. 111 • Delos DE 3009
- Schubert: Sonata in B-Flat; Impromptus • Delos DE 3018
- Szymanowski: Masques; Etudes; Mazurkas • Delos DE 1002
- Night Moods (Chopin, Debussy, Fauré, Griffes, Granados) • Delos DE 3030
- Reverie (Bach, Chopin, Debussy, Fauré, Griffes, Liszt, Ravel) • Delos DE 3113
- Singing on the Water: Piano Barcarolles (Bennett, Chopin, Debussy, Diamond, Fauré, Griffes, Rachmaninoff, Ravel) • Delos DE 3172

Chamber music recordings

- Chopin: Polonaise Brillante, Sonata Op. 65; Barber: Sonata Op. 6, Songs; Schumann: Adagio and Allegro Op. 70 ("Presenting Jian Wang")• with Jian Wang, cello • Delos DE 3097
- Bennett: Suite for Skip and Sadie • Walton: Duets for Children ("My Keyboard Friends") • with Richard Rodney Bennett, piano • Delos DE 6002
- Mozart • Beethoven: Quintets for Piano and Winds • with David Shifrin, clarinet; Allan Vogel, oboe; others • Delos DE 3024
- Brahms • Schumann: Sonatas for Clarinet & Piano • with David Shifrin, clarinet • Delos DE 3025

Recordings for young people

- Perchance to Dream: A Lullaby Album for Children and Adults (Kabalevsky, Tchaikovsky, Mozart, Schumann, Beethoven, Chopin, Bach, Haydn, Brahms) • Delos DE 3079
- Such Stuff as Dreams: A Lullaby Album for Children and Adults (Mozart, Beethoven, Schubert, Kabalevsky, Schumann, Beethoven, Grieg, Ravel, Debussy, Satie, Mendelssohn)• Delos DE 3230
- Baby Needs Lullabys (Schumann, Schubert, Mendelssohn, Liszt, Debussy, Tchaikovsky, Haydn, Bach, Brahms) • Delos DE 1619
- Prokofiev: Music for Children, Op. 65 ("Prince Ivan and the Frog Princess") • with Natalia Makarova, narrator • Delos DE 6003
- Tchaikovsky: Album for the Young, Op. 39 ("The Snow Queen") • with Natalia Makarova, narrator • Delos DE 6004
- "Beauty and the Beast" in the style of Rachmaninoff; "With a Smile and a Song" in the style of Chopin ("Heigh-Ho! Mozart: Favorite Disney tunes in Classical Style") • Donald Fraser, conductor and arranger; English Chamber Orchestra • Delos DE 3186
- "A Whole New World" in the style of Chopin; "So This is Love" in the style of Debussy ("Bibbidi Bobbidi Bach: Favorite Disney Tunes in Classical Style") • Donald Fraser, conductor and arranger; English Chamber Orchestra • Delos DE 3195
- Fraser: "I'm Flying," "Nocturne," "Distant Melody" ("The Best of Peter Pan") • Los Angeles Opera Orchestra; Grant Gershon, conductor; arrangements by Donald Fraser • Delos DE 3201
