= Constantine Orbelian =

American conductor and pianist

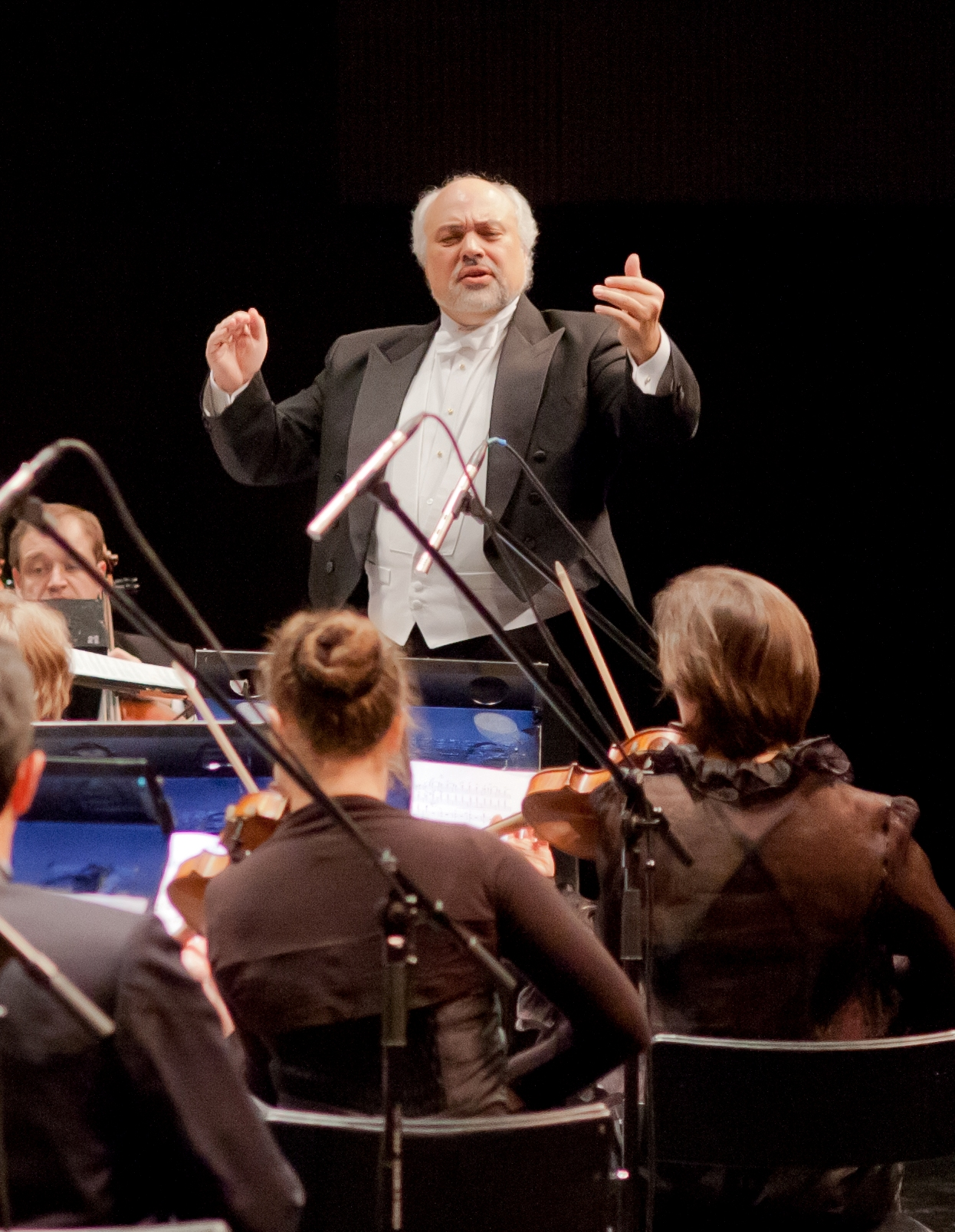
- Born: August 27, 1956; San Francisco, California, U.S.
- Education: Juilliard School
- Occupations: Conductor; pianist

Constantine Garrievich Orbelian, Jr. (Armenian: Կոնստանտին Օրբելյան, Russian: Константин Гарриевич Орбелян, born San Francisco, 27 August 1956) is an American conductor and pianist of Armenian and Russian descent. He is named after his paternal uncle Konstantin Orbelyan, a major Armenian composer. Constantine Orbelian is currently music director and Principal Conductor of the New York City Opera.

== Biography ==
Born in San Francisco to Russian and Armenian émigré parents, Orbelian made his debut as a piano prodigy with the San Francisco Symphony at the age of 11. After graduating from The Juilliard School in New York, he embarked on a career as a concert pianist appearing with major symphony orchestras throughout the U.S., U.K., Europe, and the Soviet Union. His recording of the Khachaturian piano concerto with conductor Neeme Järvi won "Best Concerto Recording of the Year" award in the United Kingdom. He was also a guest conductor for the American Russian Young Artists Orchestra.

Orbelian's appointment in 1991 as music director of the Moscow Chamber Orchestra was a breakthrough event: he is the first American ever to become music director of an ensemble in Russia. He was later the music director of the Philharmonia of Russia and is the founder of the annual Palaces of St. Petersburg International Music Festival. Orbelian has been principal conductor of the Kaunas City Symphony Orchestra in Lithuania since 2014, and in 2016 he also became General and artistic director of the State Academic Opera and Ballet Theater in Yerevan, Armenia. His appointment in June 2021 to the leadership posts at New York City Opera is a landmark in efforts to revive the company's performance profile.

Constantine Orbelian has participated in Russian-American cultural exchange through his worldwide tours, Orbelian was awarded the title "Honored Artist of Russia" in 2004. In May 2010. Orbelian led the opening Ceremonial Concert for the Cultural Olympics in Sochi which was the first event setting the stage for Russia's hosting of the Olympic Games in 2014. In 2012 the Consulate in San Francisco awarded him the Russian Order of Friendship Medal, who included pianist Van Cliburn and conductor Riccardo Muti, and which singles out non-Russians whose work contributes to the betterment of international relations with the Russian Federation and its people.

From his 1995 performance at the 50th Anniversary Celebrations of the United Nations in San Francisco to his 2004 performance at the U.S. State Department commemorating 70 years of diplomatic relations between Washington and Moscow, and a repeat State Department appearance in 2007, all with the Moscow Chamber Orchestra, Orbelian continues to use his artistic eminence in the cause of international goodwill. He and his orchestras have also participated in cultural enrichment programs for young people in Russia and the U.S. In 2001 Orbelian was awarded the Ellis Island Medal of Honor, an award given to immigrants, or children of immigrants, who have made outstanding contributions to the United States. He was awarded the Order of Friendship of Armenia in 2015.

In 2025 he was elected to be the new music director of the Israel Sinfonietta Beer Sheva.

== Discography ==
Orbelian has an extensive discography, including more than 60 releases for Delos Productions. Orbelian's début recording was Aram Khachaturian Khatchaturian's Piano Concerto, with the Royal Scottish National Orchestra Scottish National Orchestra under Neeme Järvi (1987, Chandos CHAN 8542) . A politically and artistically significant recording was Where Are You, My Brothers? — new arrangements of songs from the World War II-era performed by Dmitry Hvorostovsky and the Moscow Chamber Orchestra, and presented in front of an audience of 6,000 at the Kremlin Palace in Moscow in the spring of 2003. The telecast was seen on Russian Television by over 90 million viewers. The same program was performed with the St. Petersburg Symphony Orchestra for survivors of the Siege of Leningrad on January 16, 2004. Orbelian's collaborations with Hvorostovsky also included recordings of sentimental songs in Moscow Nights and Wait for Me, and Verdi's Simon Boccanegra. Orbelian's 2014 recording Virtuoso Rossini Arias with tenor Lawrence Brownlee was nominated for a Classical Solo Vocal Album Grammy Award and a 2015 Vocal Recital International Classical Music Awards alongside his recording of Power Players with baritone Ildar Abdrazakov. Orbelian has also received Grammy nominations for Hvorostovsky's recording of Georgy Sviridov’s vocal cycle Russia Cast Adrift, Hvorostovsky’s Rigoletto and Stephen Costello’s album of bel canto arias, A te o Cara.

== Videography ==
- Renée Fleming and Dmitri Hvorostovsky A Musical Odyssey in St Petersburg / State Hermitage Orchestra, Constantine Orbelian / Decca
- Anna Netrebko and Dmitri Hvorostovsky LIVE FROM RED SQUARE MOSCOW / State Academic Symphony Orchestra
- "Evgeny Svetlanov", Conducted by Constantine Orbelian / Deutsche Grammophon
- Hvorostovsky in Moscow / Sondra Radvanovksy and Dmitri Hvorostovsky, Constantine Orbelian, Philharmonia of Russia / Delos Productions
- To Russia With Love/ Dmitri Hvorostovsky, Constantine Orbelian, Moscow Chamber Orchestra, and Style of Five Folk Ensemble/ Delos Productions
- Russian Songs from the War Years / Dmitri Hvorostovsky, Moscow Chamber Orchestra, and Constantine Orbelian / Vai Music
