= Delos Productions =

Delos Productions, Inc.
- Parent company: Outhere
- Founded: 1973
- Founder: Amelia S. Haygood
- Distributor: Naxos
- Genre: classical music
- Country of origin: United States
- Location: Sonoma, California
- Official website: delosmusic.com

Delos Productions is an American record label. Long in Los Angeles but headquartered in Sonoma, California since 2007, it specializes in classical music. The Delos label was founded in 1973 by Amelia S. Haygood (1919–2007), whose stewardship of the company made her a prominent figure in the classical recording industry. She named the label after the Greek island of Delos, the birthplace of the Sun god Apollo, who brought music and healing to the world. The company's current director is Carol Rosenberger, an American pianist who recorded over 30 CDs for Delos in a career spanning more than three decades.

In November 2023 the Label was acquired by the Belgian classical music and jazz publisher Outhere Music.

== Recording history ==
Delos has made recordings of such ensembles as the Philadelphia Orchestra, the London Symphony Orchestra, the Dallas Symphony Orchestra, the Moscow Chamber Orchestra, the New York Chamber Symphony, the Scottish Chamber Orchestra, The Chamber Music Society of Lincoln Center, Voices of Ascension, the Shanghai Quartet, the Brazilian Guitar Quartet; and of artists such as Arleen Auger, James DePreist, Marina Domashenko, Olga Guryakova, Renée Fleming, Dmitri Hvorostovsky, Sondra Radvanovsky, Dennis Keene, Nina Kotova, Constantine Orbelian, Ewa Podleś, Jean-Pierre Rampal, Clara Rockmore, Gerard Schwarz, David Shifrin, Joshua Smith, János Starker, Andrew von Oeyen, Eugenia Zukerman and Mark Abel.

The company was one of the earliest classical labels to embrace digital recording, in 1979 beginning a collaboration with scientist Thomas Stockham, inventor of the Soundstream digital recording process. Many recordings are credited to John M. Eargle (1931–2007), a Grammy winner and Delos’ longtime Chief Engineer, and the production team of Marc Aubort and Joanna Nickrenz.

Since 2008, Delos recordings have been distributed worldwide through Naxos Records.
