= Dmitri Hvorostovsky =

Russian baritone (1962–2017)

- Дмитрий Хворостовский
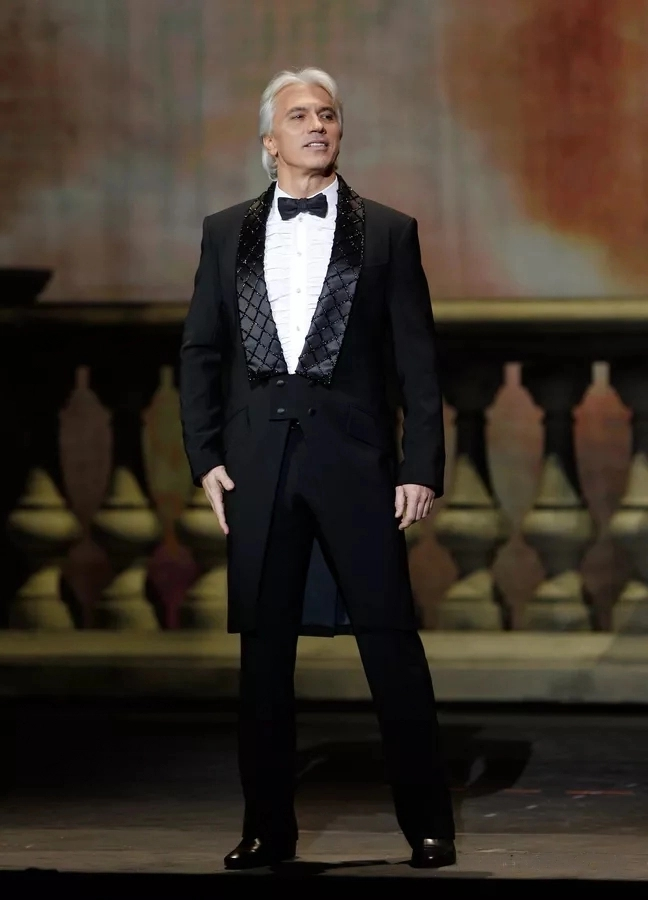
- Hvorostovsky in 2011
- Born: Dmitri Aleksandrovich Hvorostovsky; 16 October 1962; Krasnoyarsk, Russian SFSR, Soviet Union
- Died: 22 November 2017 (aged 55); London, United Kingdom
- Occupation: Opera singer (baritone)
- Title: People's Artist of Russia (1995)
- Awards: Cardiff Singer of the World (1989); Order of Alexander Nevsky (Russia, 2015); Order "For Merit to the Fatherland" (Russia, 4th class, 2017); Kammersänger 2018
- Website: www.hvorostovsky.com

External videos
- Rodrigo's aria from Don Carlos by Giuseppe Verdi on YouTube
- "Ja vas lyublyu", Yeletsky's aria from The Queen of Spades by Pyotr Ilyich Tchaikovsky on YouTube
- "Eri tu che macchiavi quell'anima", Renato's aria from Un ballo in maschera by Giuseppe Verdi on YouTube

Dmitri Aleksandrovich Hvorostovsky (Russian: Дмитрий Александрович Хворостовский, [xvərɐˈstofskʲɪj]; 16 October 1962 – 22 November 2017) was a Russian operatic baritone. He came to international prominence in 1989 when he won the BBC Cardiff Singer of the World competition. He was awarded the People's Artist of Russia honorary title in 1995 and died of brain cancer in London.

== Early life and education ==
Hvorostovsky was born in Krasnoyarsk in Siberia during a time when the city was mostly closed to foreigners. An only child, he was raised mostly by his grandmother and a grandfather who, according to Hvorostovsky, was a war veteran suffering from alcoholism. His father, an engineer, and his mother, a gynecologist, both had extremely time-consuming careers and were often only around on the weekends and holidays.

== Career ==
Hvorostovsky came to international prominence in 1989 when he won the BBC Cardiff Singer of the World competition, beating local favourite Bryn Terfel in the final round. His performance included Handel's "Ombra mai fu" and "Per me giunto...O Carlo ascolta" from Verdi's Don Carlos.

His operatic debut in the West was at the Nice Opera in Tchaikovsky's The Queen of Spades (1989). In Italy, he made his debut at La Fenice as Eugene Onegin, a success that sealed his reputation, and made his American operatic debut with the Lyric Opera of Chicago (1993) in La traviata. In 1992, he made his debut at the Royal Opera House at Covent Garden as Riccardo in Bellini's I puritani.

He subsequently sang at virtually every major opera house, including the Metropolitan Opera (debut 1995), the Berlin State Opera, La Scala and the Vienna State Opera. He was especially renowned for his portrayal of the title character in Tchaikovsky's Eugene Onegin; The New York Times described him as "born to play the role."

In 2002, Hvorostovsky performed at the Russian Children's Welfare Society's major fund raiser, the "Petrushka Ball". He was an Honorary Director of the charity.

A recital programme of new arrangements of songs from the World War II era, Where Are You My Brothers?, was given in the spring of 2003 in front of an audience of 6,000 at the Kremlin Palace in Moscow, and seen on Russian Television by over 90 million viewers. The same programme was performed with the St. Petersburg Symphony Orchestra for survivors of the Siege of Leningrad on 16 January 2004.

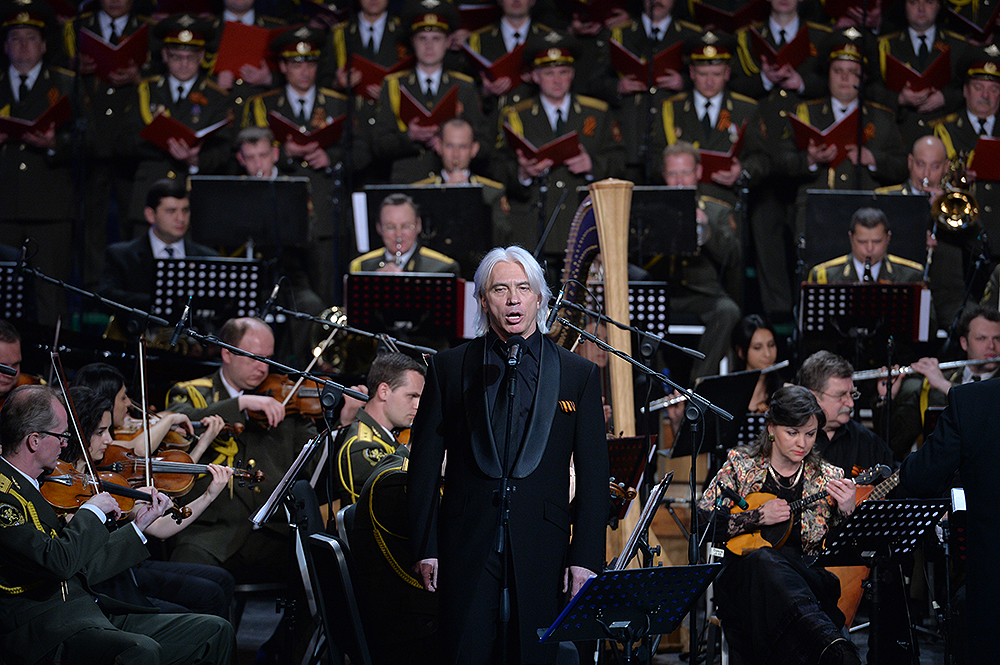
On Yerevan Opera Theatre, 12 May 2015

In later years, Hvorostovsky's stage repertoire almost entirely consisted of Verdi operas such as Un ballo in maschera, La traviata and Simon Boccanegra. In 2009 he appeared in Il trovatore in a David McVicar production at the Metropolitan Opera with Sondra Radvanovsky.

== Awards and honours ==
His highest awards in Russia include the Glinka State Prize in 1991 and the People's Artist of Russia honorary title in 1995. in 2011 he was one of the recipients of the Opera News award at the Plaza in New York City for distinguished achievement.

== Personal life ==
In 1989, Hvorostovsky married a ballerina, Svetlana, born in 1959. He adopted her daughter Maria (Mascha), and they had two children, Daniel and Alexandra. He and Svetlana divorced in 2001, the year in which he married his second wife, the Swiss soprano Florence Illi of French and Italian descent. They had two children, Nina and Maxim. His first wife, Svetlana Hvorostovsky, contracted meningitis and died in 2015 at the age of 56.

In June 2015, Hvorostovsky announced that he had been diagnosed with a brain tumour and cancelled all his performances through August. Family representatives said that he would be treated at London's cancer hospital Royal Marsden. In spite of his illness, Hvorostovsky returned to the stage at the Metropolitan Opera in September as Count di Luna in Il trovatore for a run of three performances opposite Anna Netrebko. He received strong reviews from both critics and audiences for his performance.

== Death ==
Hvorostovsky died on 22 November 2017 in London of brain cancer.

== Recordings ==
Hvorostovsky made many CD recordings, first with Valery Gergiev for Philips and then with Constantine Orbelian for Delos, and a number of his performances were filmed. Recordings of complete operas with Dmitri Hvorostovsky, audio or audio-video, legitimately made (often for broadcast) but not necessarily legitimately released:

- Bellini, I puritani, Domingo/Gruberová/Giordani/Hvorostovsky/Scandiuzzi, 1994, live in Vienna, Premiere Opera
- Donizetti, La Favorite, Queler/Larmore/Kunde/Hvorostovsky/Kowaljow, 2001, live in New York, House of Opera
- Gounod, Faust, Levine/Isokoski/Jepson/Alagna/Hvorostovsky/Pape, 2005, live in New York, Celestial Audio
- Gounod, Faust, Pidò/Gheorghiu/Losier/Grigòlo/Hvorostovsky/Pape, 2011, filmed in London*
- Leoncavallo, Pagliacci, Pappano/Gheorghiu/Domingo/Hvorostovsky/Ataneli, 2003, live in London, Premiere Opera
- Mascagni, Cavalleria rusticana, Bychkov/Norman/Giacomini/Hvorostovsky, 1990, Philips
- Mozart, Le nozze di Figaro, Harnoncourt/Kringlebotn/Röschmann/Graham/Hvorostovsky/Terfel, 1995, DVD filmed in Salzburg, House of Opera
- Prokofiev, Voyna i mir (War and Peace), Gergiev/Netrebko/Livengood/Balashov/Grigorian/Hvorostovsky/Ramey/Cheek, 2 March 2002, live in New York, House of Opera
- Rimsky-Korsakov, Tsarskaya nevesta (The Tsar's Bride), Gergiev/Shaguch/Borodina/Akimov/Hvorostovsky, 1998, Philips
- Tchaikovsky, Evgeny Onegin, Bychkov/Focile/Borodina/Shicoff/Hvorostovsky/Anisimov, 1992, Philips
- Tchaikovsky, Evgeny Onegin, Bychkov/Focile/Pecková/Shicoff/Hvorostovsky/Anisimov, 1992, DVD filmed in Paris, Premiere Opera
- Tchaikovsky, Evgeny Onegin, Gergiev/Fleming/Zaremba/Vargas/Hvorostovsky/Aleksashkin, 2007, DVD filmed in New York, Decca; also available for streaming in HD at Met Opera on Demand
- Tchaikovsky, Evgeny Onegin, Davis-A/Kuznetsova/Surguladze/Lopardo/Hvorostovsky/Kowaljow, 2008, live in Chicago, Premiere Opera
- Tchaikovsky, Iolanta, Gergiev/Gorchakova/Grigorian/Hvorostovsky/Aleksashkin, 1994, Philips
- Tchaikovsky, Pikovaya dama, Fedoseyev/Datsko/Arkhipova/Tarashchenko/Hvorostovsky/Gritziuk, 1990, live in Moscow, MCA
- Tchaikovsky, Pikovaya dama, Gergiev/Shevchenko/Gorr/Steblianko/Hvorostovsky/Leiferkus, 1991, live in Amsterdam, Live Opera Heaven
- Tchaikovsky, Pikovaya dama, Ozawa/Freni/Forrester/Atlantov/Hvorostovsky/Leiferkus, 1991, live in Boston, RCA
- Tchaikovsky, Pikovaya dama, Gergiev/Guleghina/Rysanek/Grigorian/Hvorostovsky/Putilin, 1995, live in New York, Opera Lovers
- Tchaikovsky, Pikovaya dama, Gergiev/Gorchakova/Söderström/Domingo/Hvorostovsky/Putilin, 1999, DVD filmed in New York, House of Opera; also available for streaming in SD at Met Opera on Demand
- Tchaikovsky, Pikovaya dama, Ozawa/Gorchakova/Gorr/Domingo/Hvorostovsky/Leiferkus, 1999, live in Vienna, House of Opera
- Tchaikovsky, Pikovaya dama, Haitink/Mattila/Barstow/Galusin/Hvorostovsky/Putilin, 2001, live in London, Celestial Audio
- Verdi, Un ballo in maschera, Noseda/Crider/Sala/Blythe/Licitra/Hvorostovsky, 2007, live in New York, Sirius
- Verdi, Un ballo in maschera, Noseda/Brown/Sala/Blythe/Licitra/Hvorostovsky, 2008, live in New York, Sirius
- Verdi, Un ballo in maschera, Luisi/Radvanovsky/Kim-K/Blythe/Álvarez-M/Hvorostovsky, 2012, video recorded live at the Met in New York, available for streaming in HD at Met Opera on Demand
- Verdi, Un ballo in maschera, Levine/Radvanovsky/Stober/Zajick/Beczala/Hvorostovsky, 2015, live in New York, Sirius
- Verdi, Don Carlos, Haitink/Gorchakova/Borodina/Margison/Hvorostovsky/Scandiuzzi, 1996, Philips
- Verdi, Don Carlos, Gergiev/Villarroel/Zajick/Margison/Hvorostovsky/Ramey, 2002, live in New York, Sirius
- Verdi, Don Carlos, Levine/Racette/Borodina/Botha/Hvorostovsky/Pape, 2006, live in New York, Sirius
- Verdi, Don Carlos, Maazel/Frittoli/Smirnova/Vargas/Hvorostovsky/Furlanetto-F, 2013, live in New York, Sirius
- Verdi, Don Carlos, Nézet-Séguin/Frittoli/Gubanova/Lee-YH/Hvorostovsky/Furlanetto-F, 2015, live in New York, Sirius
- Verdi, Ernani, Armiliato/Meade/de Biasio/Hvorostovsky/Furlanetto-F, 2012, live in New York, Sirius
- Verdi, Ernani, Armiliato/Meade/Giordani/Hvorostovsky/Furlanetto-F, 2012, video recorded live at the Met in New York, available for streaming in HD at Met Opera on Demand
- Verdi, I masnadieri, Downes/Delligatti/Farina/Hvorostovsky/Colombara, 1998, live at Baden-Baden, House of Opera
- Verdi, I masnadieri, Downes/Delligatti/Farina/Hvorostovsky/Pape, 2002, live in London*
- Verdi, Rigoletto, Downes/Siurina/Villazón/Hvorostovsky, 2005, live in London, Premiere Opera
- Verdi, Rigoletto, Heras Casado/Lungu/Polenzani/Hvorostovsky, 2013, live in New York, Sirius
- Verdi, Rigoletto, Heras Casado/Yoncheva/Polenzani/Hvorostovsky, 2013, live in New York, Sirius
- Verdi, Rigoletto, Orbelian/Sierra/Demuro/Hvorostovsky, 2016, Delos
- Verdi, Simon Boccanegra, Summers-P/Guryakova/Berti/Hvorostovsky/Aceto, 2006, live in Houston, Live Opera Heaven
- Verdi, Simon Boccanegra, Levine/Frittoli/de Biasio/Hvorostovsky/Furlanetto-F, 2011, live in New York, Sirius
- Verdi, Simon Boccanegra, Levine/Frittoli/Vargas/Hvorostovsky/Furlanetto-F, 2011, live in New York, Sirius
- Verdi, Simon Boccanegra, Orbelian/Frittoli/Secco/Hvorostovsky/Abdrazakov, 2014, Delos
- Verdi, La traviata, Mehta/Te Kanawa/Kraus/Hvorostovsky, 1993, Philips
- Verdi, La traviata, Gergiev/Fleming/Vargas/Hvorostovsky, 2004, live in New York, Sirius
- Verdi, La traviata, Maazel/Ciofi/Saccà/Hvorostovsky, 2004, DVD filmed in Venice, TDK
- Verdi, La traviata, Benini/Netrebko/Kaufmann/Hvorostovsky, 2008, live in London, Celestial Audio
- Verdi, La traviata, Luisi/Dessay/Polenzani/Hvorostovsky, 2012, video recorded live at the Met in New York, available for streaming in HD at Met Opera on Demand
- Verdi, Il trovatore, Rizzi/Villarroel/Naef/Cura/Hvorostovsky, 2002, DVD filmed in London, Opus Arte
- Verdi, Il trovatore, Luisotti/Radvanovsky/Blythe/Berti/Hvorostovsky, 2009, live in San Francisco, Premiere Opera
- Verdi, Il trovatore, Noseda/Radvanovsky/Zajick/Álvarez-M/Hvorostovsky, 2009, live in New York, Sirius
- Verdi, Il trovatore, Rizzi/Radvanovsky/Walewska/Alagna/Hvorostovsky, 2009, live in London, Premiere Opera
- Verdi, Il trovatore, Armiliato/Radvanovsky/Zajick/Álvarez-M/Hvorostovsky, 2011, DVD filmed in New York, DG; also available for streaming in HD at Met Opera on Demand
- Verdi, Il trovatore, Armiliato/Netrebko/Zajick/Lee-YH/Hvorostovsky, 2015, Oct 3, video recorded live at the Met in New York, available for streaming in HD at Met Opera on Demand, Hvorostovsky's last staged performance in that house

asterisk = label unknown, or recording exists but has not been made commercially available

=== Light music ===
Hvorostovsky's interest in Russian and other light classical and traditional song led to several recordings including:

- I Met You, My Love 2002
- Where Are You My Brothers? 2003
- Passione di Napoli 2001, Delos
