= Tsarina's Golden Chamber =

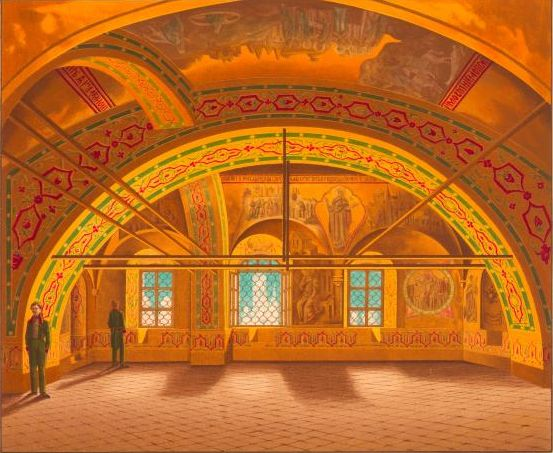
Tsarina Golden Palace

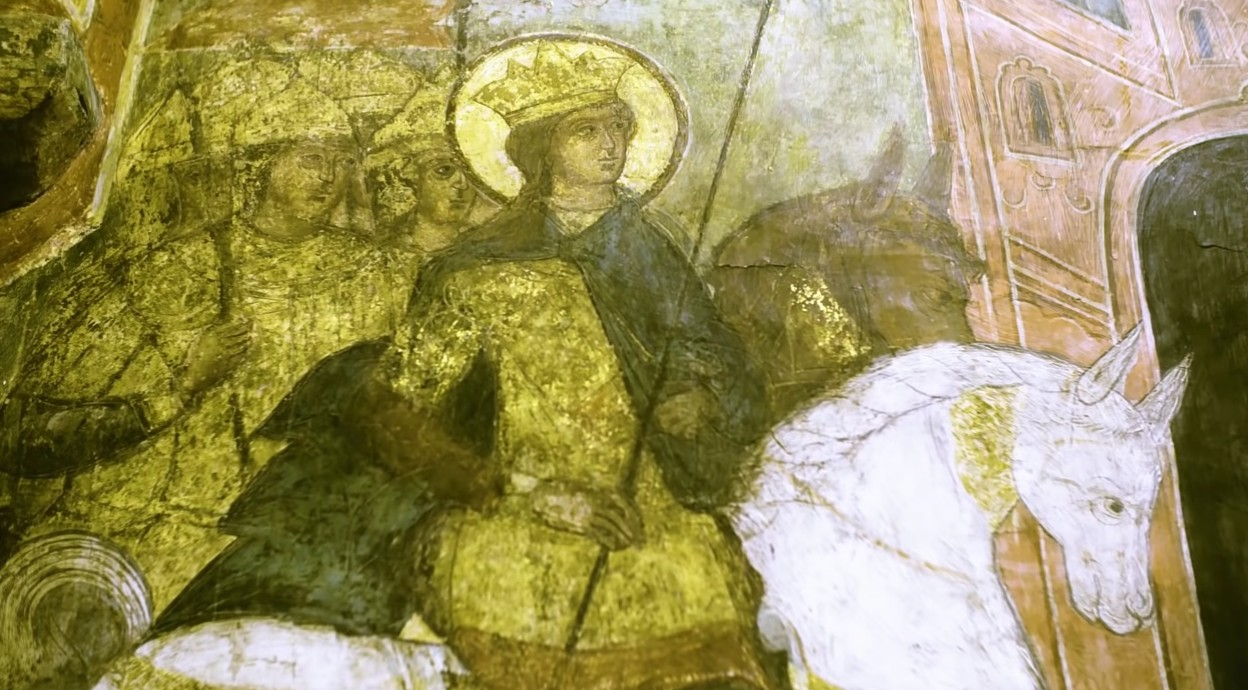
Fresco of Queen Dinar of Hereti in the chamber.

The Tsarina's Golden Chamber (Russian: Золотая Царицына Палата, Zolotaya Tzaritsyna Palata) (alternatively spelled as "Czarina's") is the official reception room of the Russian tsarinas, where they held formal celebrations of Russian monarchs' weddings, meetings with Russian and foreign clergy, and receptions for relatives of the imperial family and for ladies of the court. It is part of the tsar's palace in the Moscow Kremlin. Золотая Царицына Палата is also the name of the building that houses the chamber, this time using Палата in the sense of "palace". The small building is generally known by its famous interior, "Tsarina's Golden Chamber".

== History ==
The Chamber was part of the palace complex built in the Kremlin in late 15th and mid 19th centuries. The tsarina's quarters must have been located in that part of the palace. It is situated on a ground floor and was built in the early 16th century. In the 1580s, it was rebuilt as a ceremonial reception room of Tsarina Irina Godunova, the wife of Tsar Feodor I of Russia. The names of its builders are unknown; it may be assumed, however, that they were familiar with Italian Renaissance architecture.

The walls of the chamber are decorated with paintings on a golden background. The paintings on the vault show episodes from Christian history associated with Emperor Constantine of Byzantium and his mother, Helena. On the slant of the eastern wall near which the tsarina's throne used to stand is a series of paintings depicting the conversion of princess Olga, the first Russian Christian princess, and her baptism. Shown on the northern wall are scenes from the Life of St. Dinara, a Georgian saint who, together with her host, valiantly defended the Christian faith. The paintings on the western wall feature scenes from the life of Empress St. Theodora.

The Anteroom or Passage Chamber is adjacent to the west side of the Tsarina's Golden Chamber. In the early 17th century, it was named Zhiletskaya ("Dwellers") because the palace's resident guards and servants were always present there.

During the four centuries of its existence, the Tsarina's Golden Chamber underwent a number of structural alterations and its frescoes were repainted more than once. In 1970–1978 extensive restoration work was carried out there. The restoration was important because this is the only specimen of Old Russian secular monumental painting in Moscow to have survived to the present day.

The Tsarina's Golden Chamber was first mentioned in manuscripts in 1526 as Naugolnaya ("Corner"). It and the Faceted Chamber are the oldest civil buildings in the Moscow Kremlin.
