= Grand Kremlin Palace =

Palace in Moscow, Russia

- Большой Кремлёвский дворец
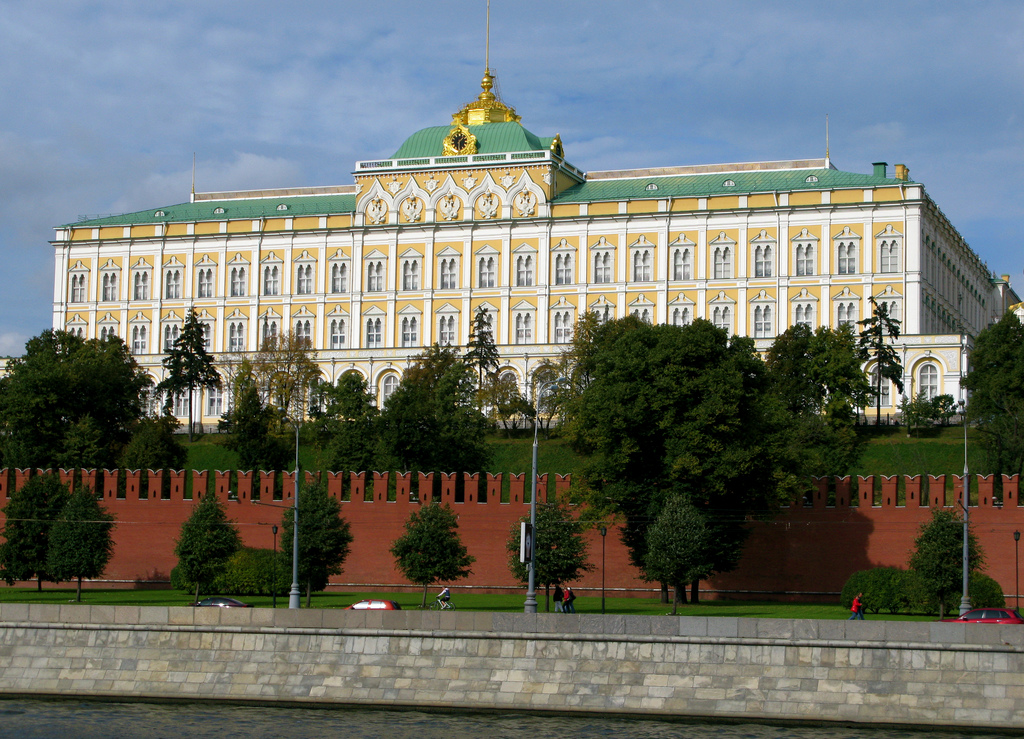
- View from across the Moskva River
- Interactive map of the Grand Kremlin Palace area

General information
- Architectural style: Russian Revival, Byzantine Revival
- Location: Moscow, Russia
- Coordinates: 55.75°N 37.6158°E
- Construction started: 1837
- Completed: 1849

Height
- Height: 47 metres (154 ft)

Technical details
- Floor area: 25,000 square metres (270,000 sq ft)

The Grand Kremlin Palace (Russian: Большой Кремлёвский дворец, romanized: Bolshoy Kremlyovskiy dvorets) is a building in the Moscow Kremlin. For much of the 19th century, it served as the official residence of the Russian emperor in Moscow, which was not then the capital of the Russian Empire. Designed by a team of architects under the management of Konstantin Thon, architect of the Kremlin Armoury and the Cathedral of Christ the Saviour, the palace was intended to emphasise the greatness of Russian autocracy.

The Grand Kremlin Palace serves as the official working residence of the president of Russia and also houses a museum.

== History ==
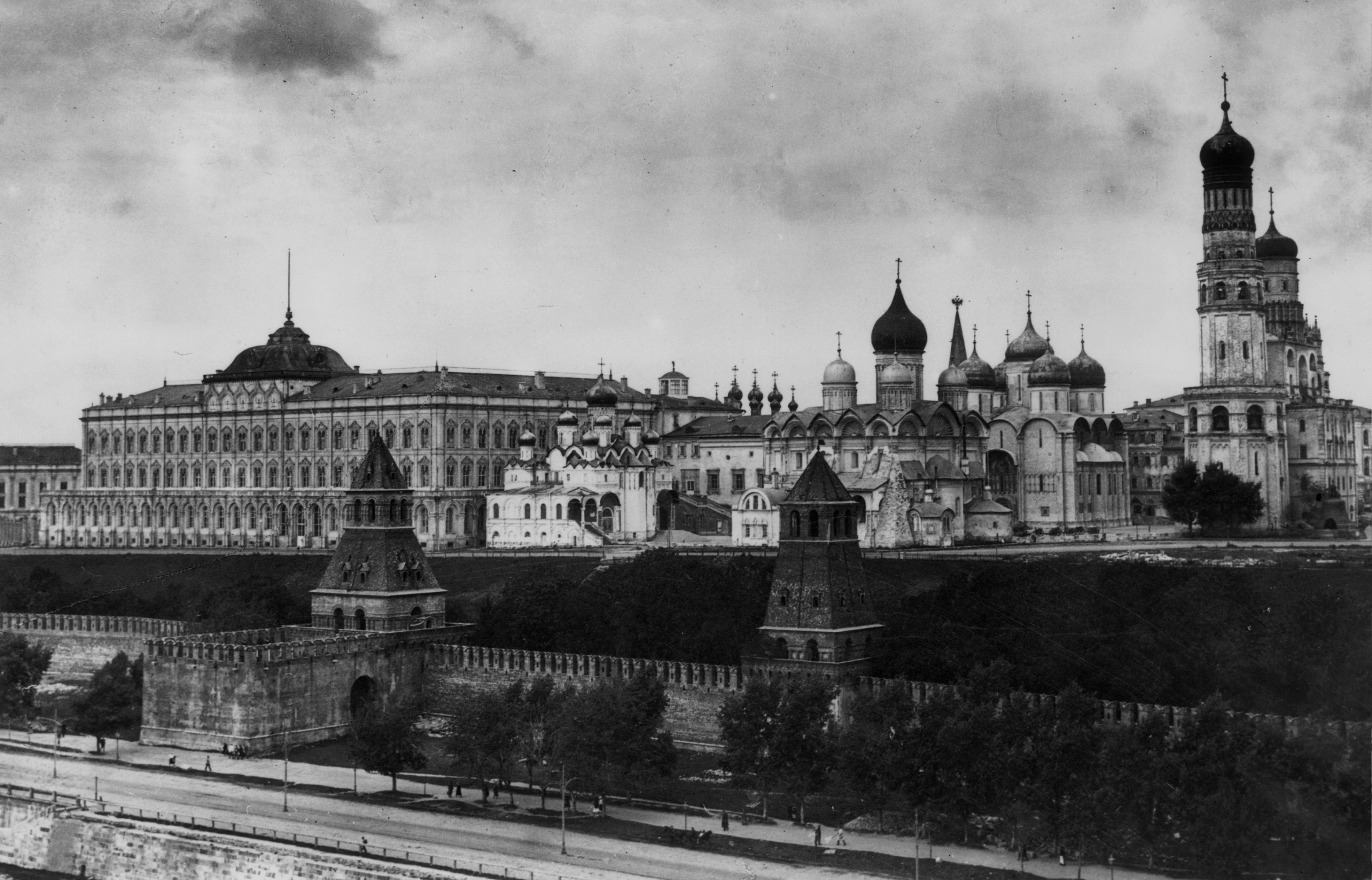
Kremlin Palace and churches, early 1920s

The Grand Kremlin Palace was built between 1837 and 1849 to serve as the tsar's Moscow residence, on the site of the estate of the Grand Princes, which had been established in the 14th century on Borovitsky Hill; its construction involved the demolition of the previous Baroque palace on the site, designed by Rastrelli, and the 16th century Church of St. John the Baptist, constructed to a design by Aloisio the New in place of the first church ever built in Moscow.

The palace by Thon is 124 metres long, 47 metres high, and has a total area of about 25,000 square metres. It includes the earlier Terem Palace, nine churches from the 14th, 16th, and 17th centuries, the Holy Vestibule, and over 700 rooms. The buildings of the Palace form a rectangle with an inner courtyard. The building appears to be three storeys, but is actually two; the upper floor has high ceilings and two sets of windows. The west building of the Palace held state reception halls and the imperial family's private chambers.

Five reception halls (Georgievsky, Vladimirsky, Aleksandrovsky, Andreyevsky, and Ekaterininsky) are named for orders of the Russian Empire: the Orders of St. George, St. Vladimir, St. Alexander, St. Andrew, and St. Catherine. The Georgievsky Hall is used today for state and diplomatic receptions and official ceremonies. International treaties are signed in the Vladimirsky Hall, which also leads to the Palace of Facets, the Tsarina's Golden Chamber, the Terem Palace, the Winter Palace, and the Palace of Congresses. Aleksandrovsky Hall and Andreyevsky Hall were combined in Soviet times to be used for meetings and conferences of the Supreme Soviet of the USSR; but they were lavishly restored in accordance with Thon's designs in the 1990s.

== Structure and architecture ==
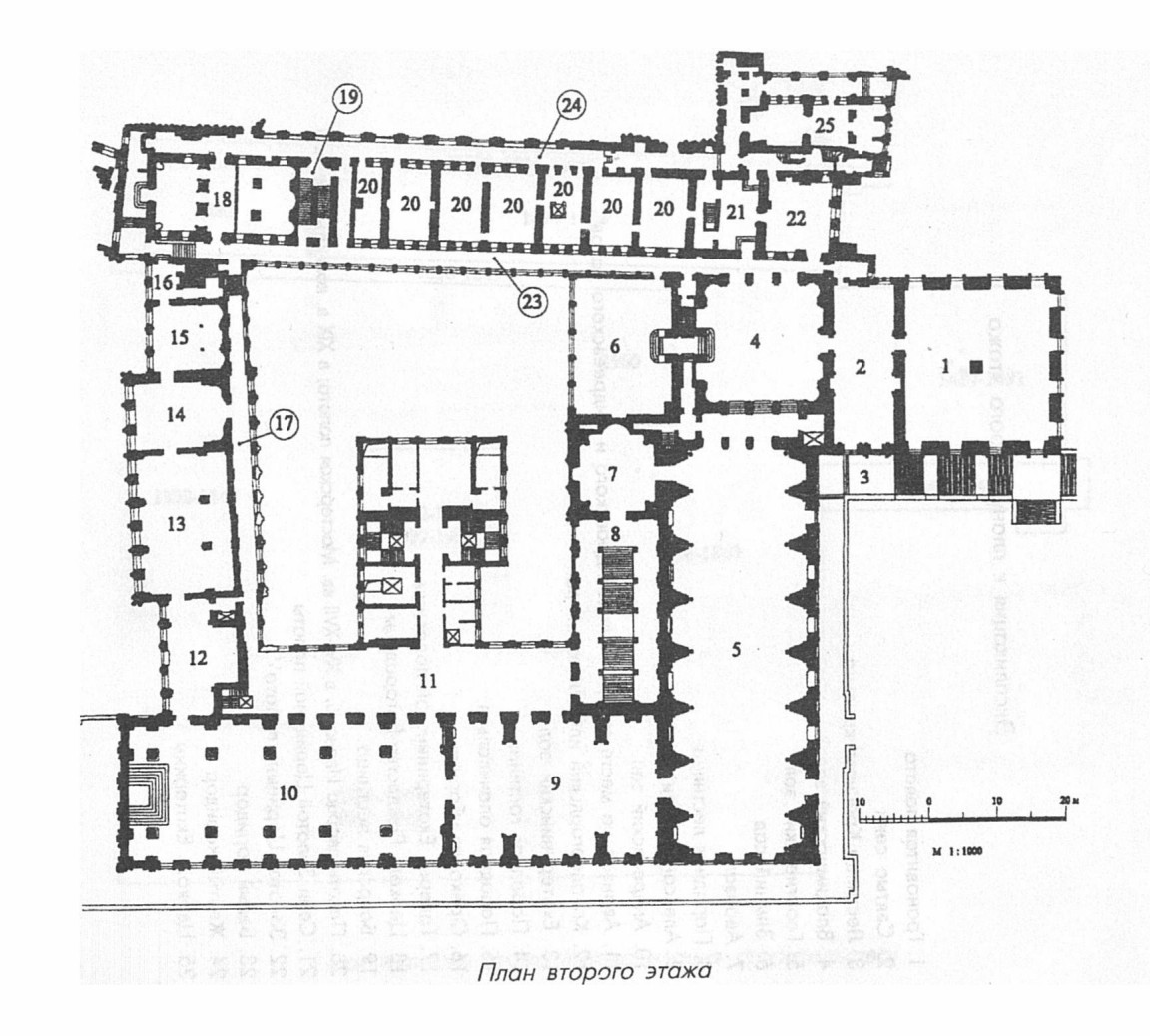
Layout of 2nd floor

The Grand Kremlin Palace is 125 metres long and 47 metres high. The total area of the complex exceeds 25,000 square metres. In plan, the Grand Kremlin Palace is presented in the form of a square with a small Cour d'honneur, in the centre of which was the Church of the Saviour on Boru, demolished in the 1930s. The main façade of the complex faces the Kremlin embankment, with the palace's Annunciation Entrance overlooking Sobornaya Square.

Architect Konstantin Thon repeated the composition of the previous palace complex, consisting of various buildings of different times. Art historians suppose that following the peculiarities of Old Russian architecture the complex was asymmetrical. Presumably, the arcade of the ground floor was an allegory for the composition of the palace of Ivan III, and the winter garden corresponded to the ancient Kremlin parks. The façades of the complex corresponding to the decoration of the Terem Palace, in particular, the architect repeated the framing of the windows in greatly enlarged dimensions. They are in the form of arches with narrow piers, giving the building a resemblance to an enclosed gallery. The second tier is divided by pilasters and richly decorated with carved white-stone platbands in Russian-Byzantine style with double arches in the centre, typical for Russian architecture of the 17th century. Before 1917, the facade of the palace was decorated with five white-stone bas-reliefs in the form of two-headed eagles, above which were the emblems of Moscow, St Petersburg, Kazan, Astrakhan, Poland and Tavrida. After the October Revolution, they were replaced with the letters СССР and the coat of arms of the Soviet Union.

=== Layout ===
The palace has a geometric plan characteristic of late classicism. However, the main entrance is not in the centre of the main facade, but in the eastern part of the palace, which was unusual for the architecture of that period. The entranceway is modestly decorated and is highlighted on the outside by a pair of lights hanging on chains. The shape of the doors corresponds to the window openings. The location of the entrance was necessitated by the need to accommodate a straight grand staircase of 66 steps, the length of which would not have allowed the structure to be installed in the centre of the complex. It is made of Revel stone. The walls of the room are made of artificial marble and the columns are made of natural Serdobol marble. A staircase leads to the first floor to the vestibule, from where the enfilade of grand double-height halls and ceremonial chambers begins. Next to the main entrance on the ground floor is a marble vestibule with polished granite columns, as well as the Own Half of the Imperial Family.

== Current status ==
The Grand Kremlin Palace is the current residence of the Russian president, where official events are held. For example, the inauguration of the president of Russia takes place in The Hall of the Order of St. Andrew. Excursions take place during free time from official events according to requests from organisations addressed to the Head of the Commandant's Office of the Moscow Kremlin. Visitors may see the Faceted Chamber, the premises of the Teremnoy Palace, the Private Half of Their Imperial Majesties, and the ceremonial halls of the orders, except for the Catherine Palace. The tour itinerary also does not include the Emperor's study and the Golden Chamber of Tsaritsyno.

== Interiors of the ceremonial halls ==
=== The Hall of the Order of St. George ===
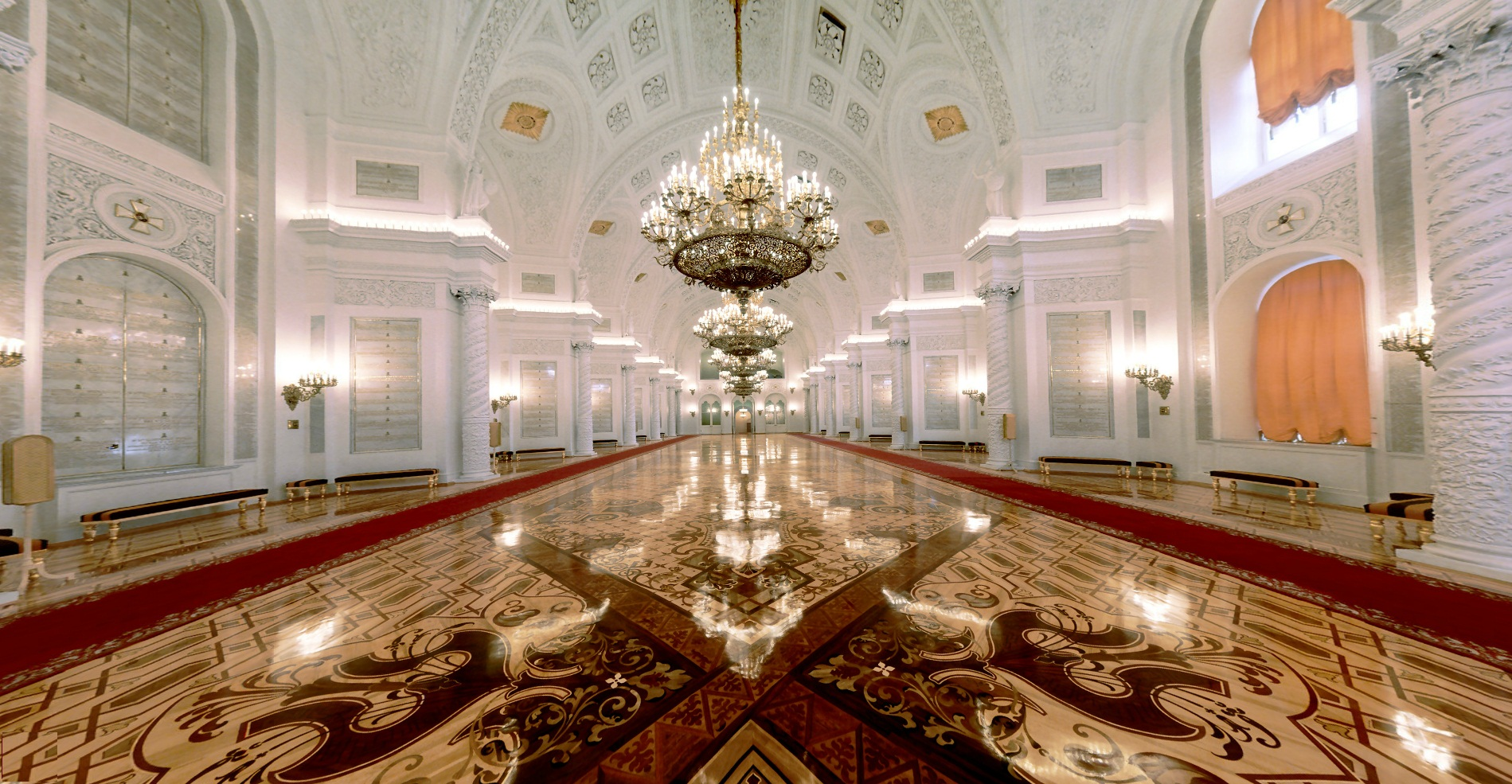
The Hall of the Order of St. George

The Hall of the Order of St. George (Georgievsky Hall) is the first and largest of the staterooms of the palace. It was named after the Order of St. George the Victorious, which was approved by Catherine II in 1769 and which was the highest military decoration of the Russian Empire. The walls of the room are decorated with gold embossed stars and insignia with the motto "For Service and Bravery" ("Za Sluzhbu i Khrabrost"). The room is covered by a semi-cylindrical coffered ceiling supported by eighteen pylons. At the top, they are decorated with statues symbolising the country's military victories. By order of the emperor, marble plaques with a list of the regiments, crews and batteries which had received the St George Colors were installed in the room. In addition, the names of all the holders of the order were engraved on the walls.

Initially, civil servants and representatives of the Moscow nobility gathered in St George's Hall during the celebrations. During a reception on the occasion of the 1945 Victory Parade, invited servicemen gathered in St George's Hall. The room was subsequently used for the presentation of military awards, decorations and prizes to figures of science and culture, as well as meetings of party representatives with civilians.

=== The Hall of the Order of St. Alexander Nevsky ===
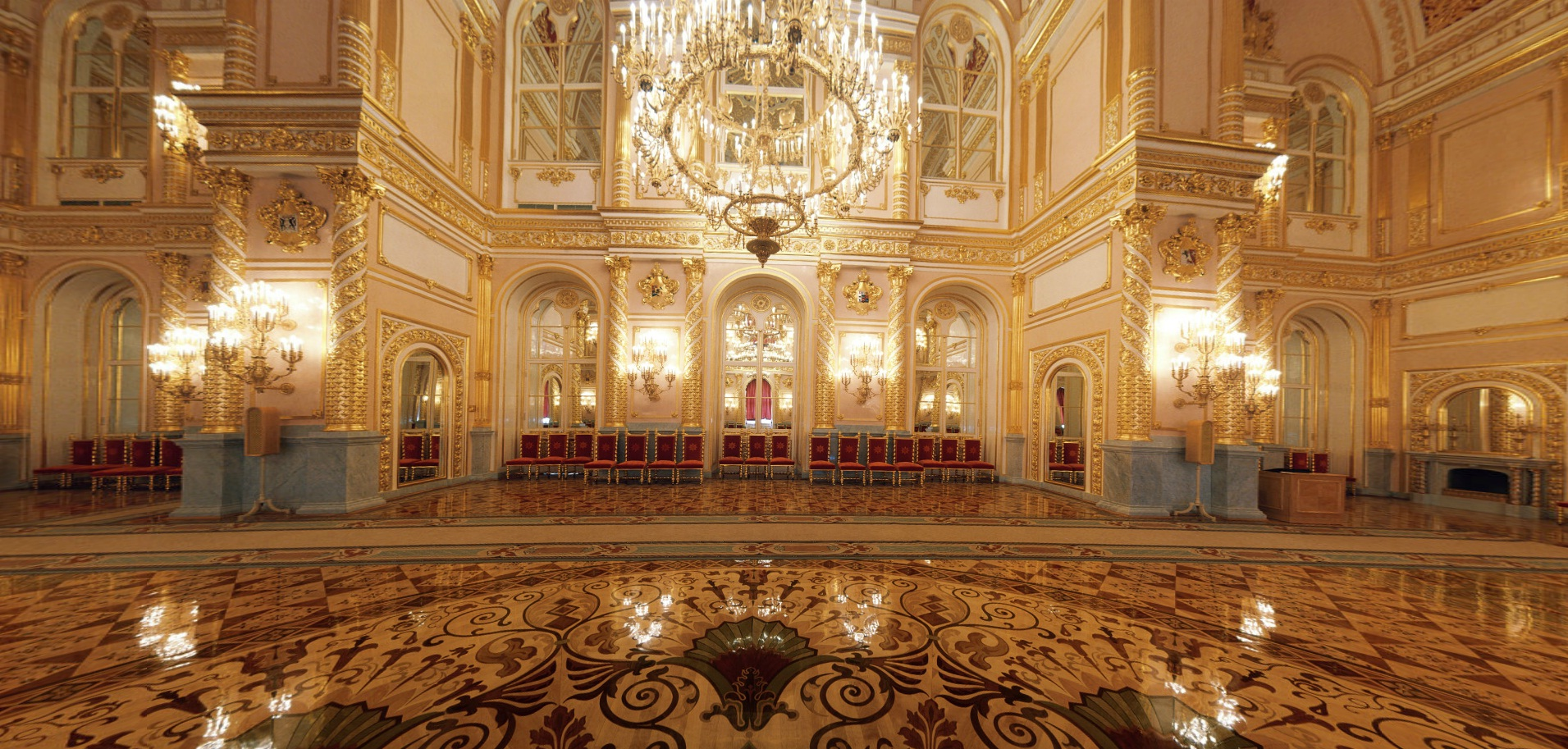
The Hall of the Order of St. Alexander Nevsky

The Hall of the Order of St. Alexander Nevsky was named after the Order of St. Alexander Nevsky, established by Catherine I in 1725. The room is situated in the central part of the first floor on the south façade of the complex and is connected with The Hall of the Order of St. George by massive silver-plated doors with gold ornaments, depicting the Order's ribbons and stars.

The rectangular room is 31 metres long, 20 metres wide and 20 metres high. The hall is decorated with the coats of arms of the provinces and districts of the Russian Empire, wall mirrors, four marble fireplaces and candelabrums made in the factories of the Duke of Leuchtenberg. From above, it is covered by an elliptical dome on four pylons with images of the Order's coats of arms, stars and the monogram of St. Alexander. The parquet is of thirty species of wood.

Initially in The Hall of the Order of St. Alexander Nevsky six paintings of the artist Feodor Moller, representing the moments from Alexander Nevskiy's life, were placed: his entrance to the liberated Pskov, The Battle of the Neva, his marriage with the Polotsk princess, his stay in Golden Horde.

In the 1930s the room was reconstructed and became part of the Assembly Hall. The interiors were restored in 1994-1999 and the room was subsequently used for meetings of the State Council.

=== The Hall of the Order of St. Vladimir ===
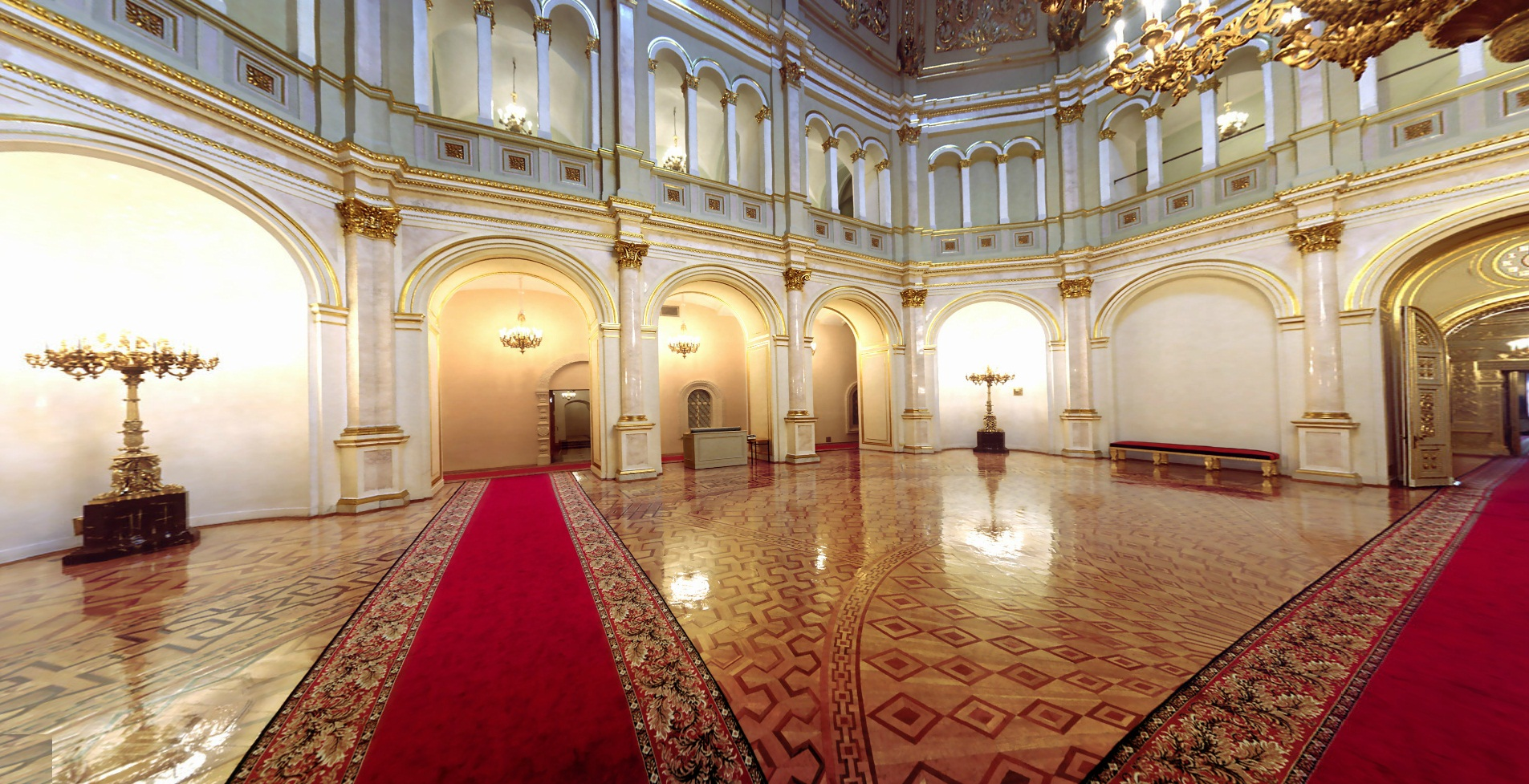
The Hall of the Order of St. Vladimir

The Hall of the Order of St. Vladimir was named after the Order of St. Vladimir, instituted by Catherine the Great in 1782. Light enters the hall only through a lantern in the centre of the hipped dome from which hangs a tiered chandelier made in a factory in St Petersburg. The three-toned structure was originally placed in The Anteroom, for which it proved too large, and it was later re-hung in The Hall of the Order of St. Vladimir. The room also had four-floor lamps of dark bronze.

The spatial composition of the room reminds of a baptistery and is designed as a rotunda with a by-pass gallery and a balustrade on the first-floor level. The room was originally a square in plan with sides of sixteen metres each, but the niches in the corners give it a resemblance to an octagon. The decoration of the room corresponded to the symbols of the Order and was done in a range of white, pink and pale green colours. The walls and pilasters are lined with pink and white marble, and the star-shaped parquet is made of more than twenty kinds of wood. The dome of the hall is decorated with mouldings depicting the Order of St. Vladimir.

After 1918, the Hall of the Order of St. Vladimir was used for signing treaties between the USSR and foreign countries.

=== The Hall of the Order of St. Andrew ===
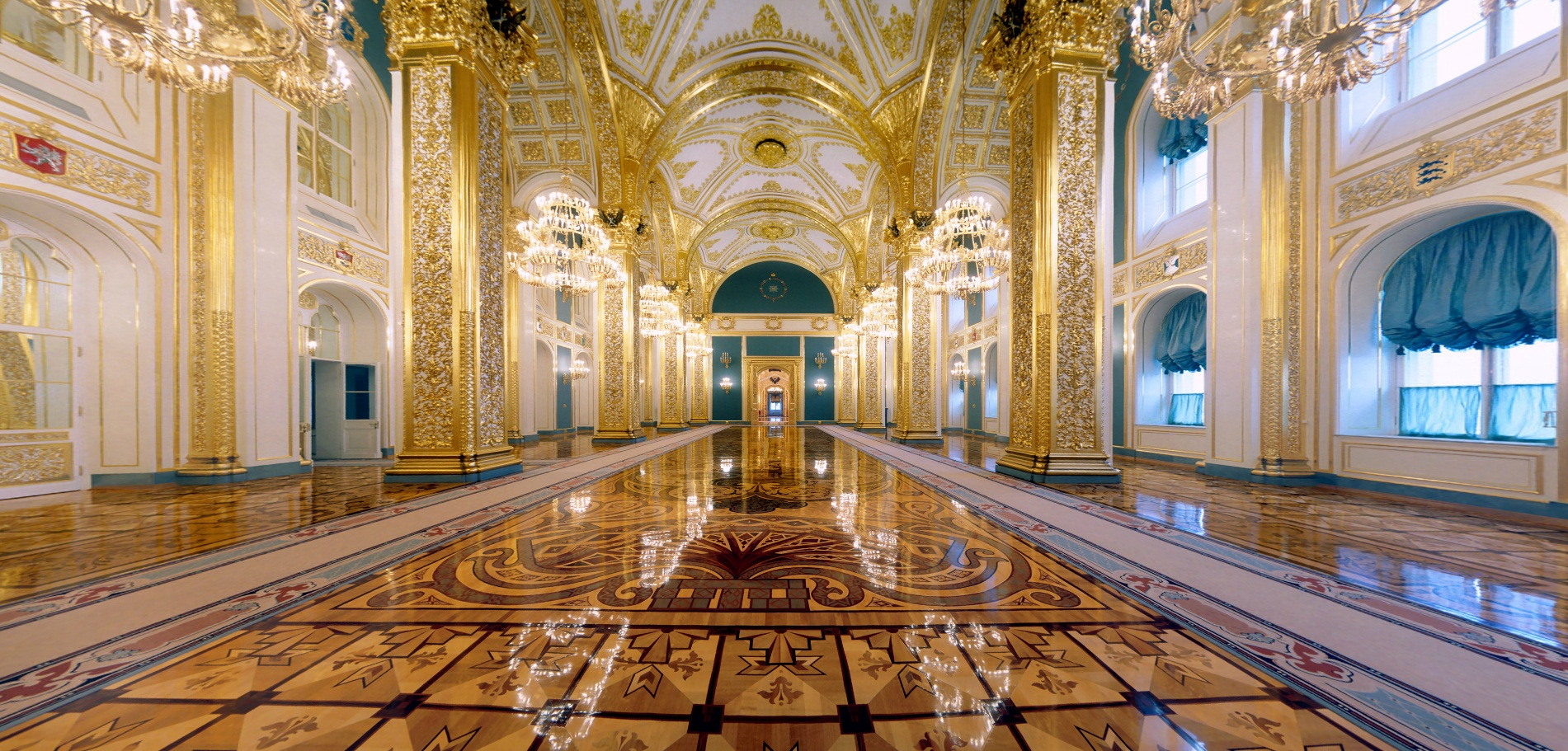
The Hall of the Order of St. Andrew

The Hall of the Order of St. Andrew was the main room in the enfilade of official rooms dedicated to the military honours of the Russian Empire. It corresponded to the Order of St. Andrew, which Peter the Great established in 1698.

The hall was used for ceremonial events and the coronations of Alexander II, Alexander III and Nicholas II were held within its walls. Initially, the centrepiece of the room was the throne of the incumbent monarch, decorated with carvings and precious stones. At the end of the 19th century, the pedestal was replaced by three seats for Emperor Nicholas II, Empresses Alexandra Feodorovna and Maria Feodorovna.

After the Russian Revolution, the Comintern congresses, conventions and summit meetings were held in the Hall of the Order of St. Andrew. In 1933-1934, the Hall of the Order of St. Andrew and the Hall of the Order of St. Alexander Nevsky were merged and rebuilt to hold meetings of the Supreme Soviet of the USSR.

In 1993, Russian president Boris Yeltsin ordered the restoration of the historic appearance of the chambers.

After the reconstruction, the room was used for solemn meetings and events. Now the hall is used for sessions of the State Council and meetings of foreign ambassadors. The inauguration of the Russian president takes place in the Hall of the Order of St. Andrew.

=== The Hall of the Order of St. Catherine ===
The Hall of the Order of St. Catherine served as the throne room for Russian empresses and was named after the Order of St. Catherine, established in 1714. Flanking the entrance are pilasters on massive pillars decorated with malachite mosaic patterns. The walls are decorated with orderly reliefs, made in filigree and decorated with rhinestones. The parquet was designed by Fedor Solntsev.

In the 20th century, the halls of the Grand Kremlin Palace were used for meetings of the Soviet of the Union and the Soviet of Nationalities, as well as various committees during sessions of the Supreme Soviet of the USSR. During World War II, solemn meetings with foreign delegations were organised in the Grand Kremlin Palace. Seventeen events were held within the walls of The Hall of the Order of St. Catherine during this period. Chinese diplomat Soong Ziwen and General Dwight Eisenhower, among others, were present at these receptions.

As of 2018, the hall was not included in the tour programme of the Grand Kremlin Palace, as the room was used for meetings of the Russian president with foreign delegations and negotiations.

== Gallery ==
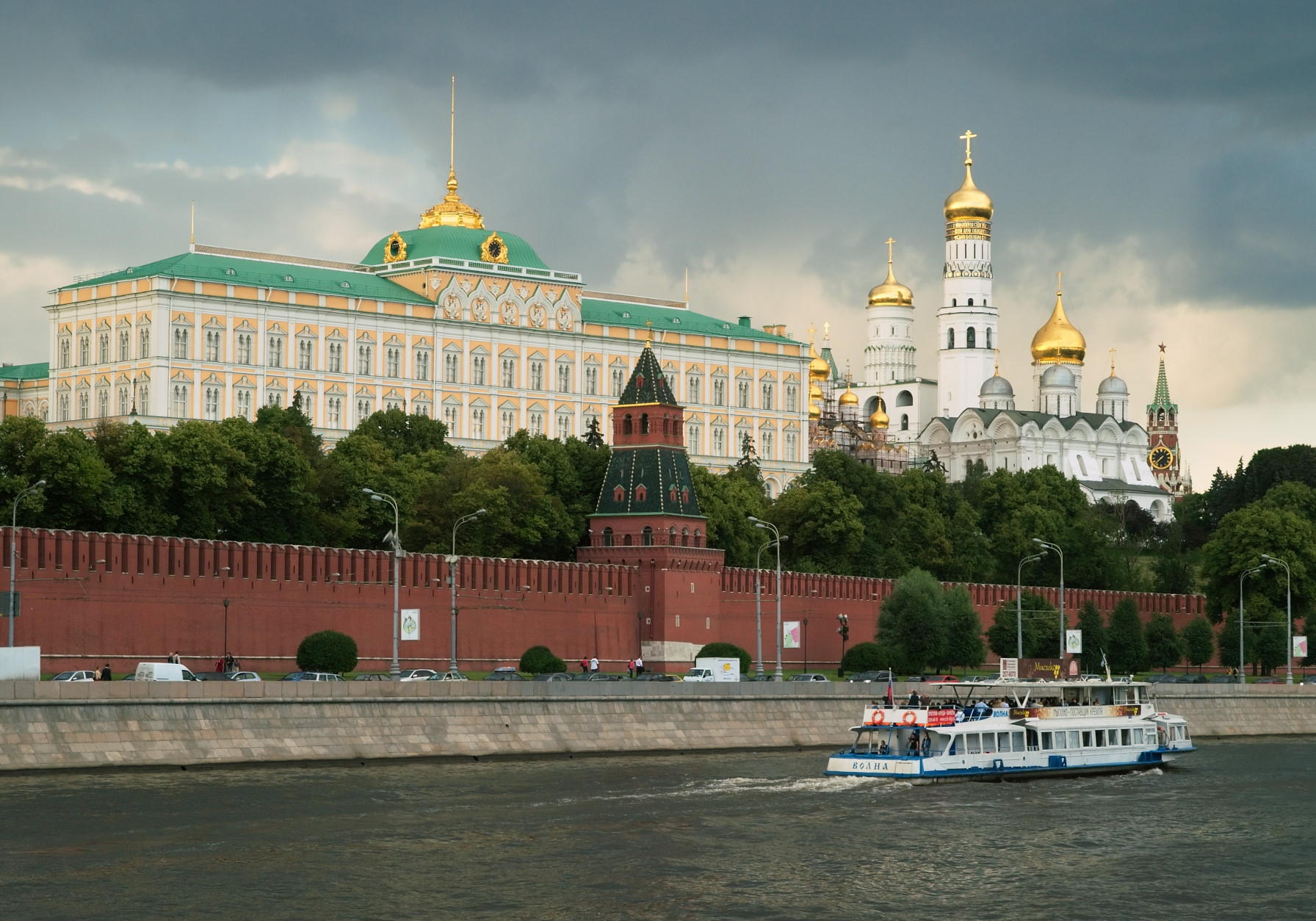
View from the Moskva River

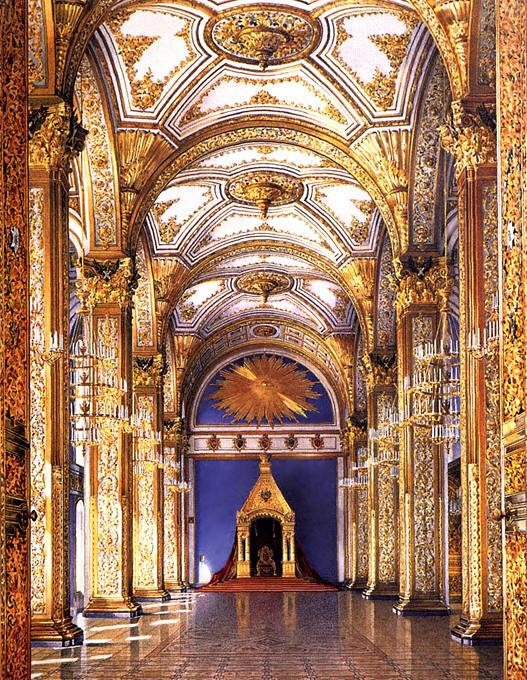
The Hall of the Order of St. Andrew

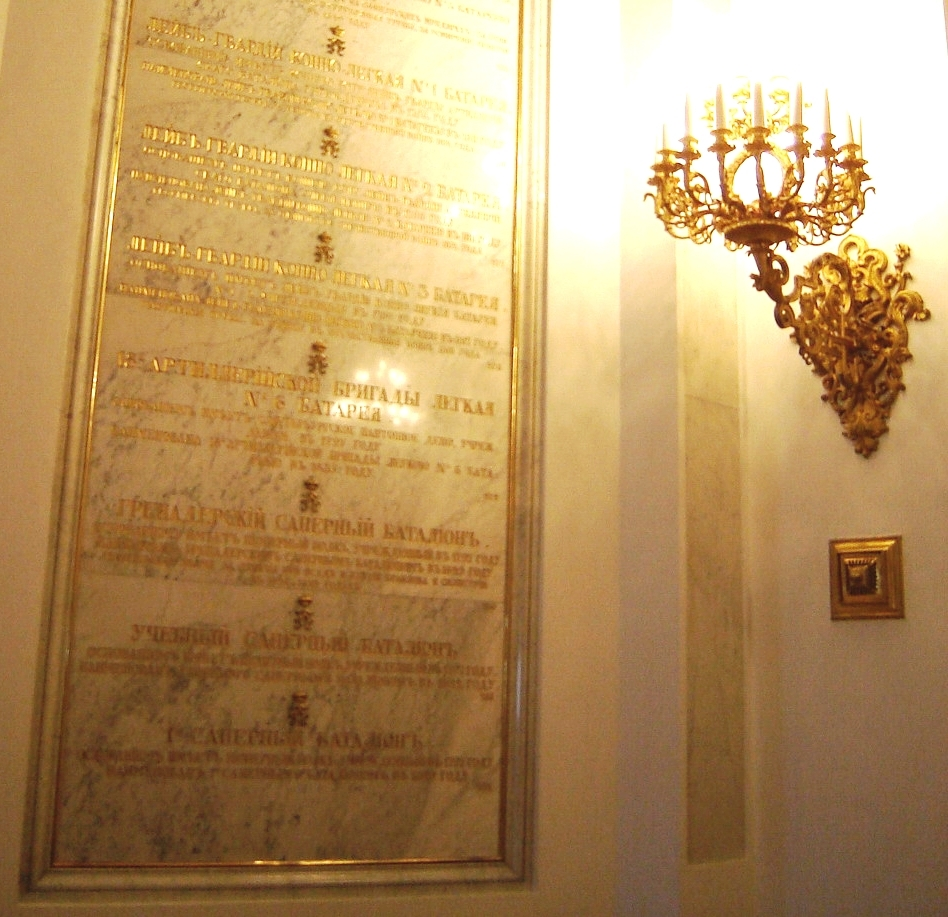
Detail of plaques in Georgievsky Hall

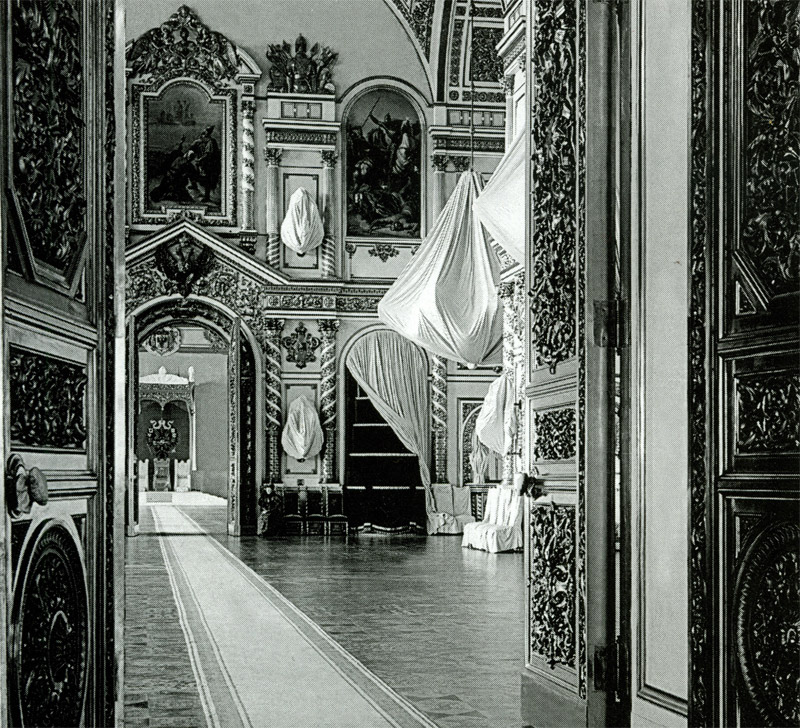
Aleksandr Hall during coronation of Nicholas II, 1896

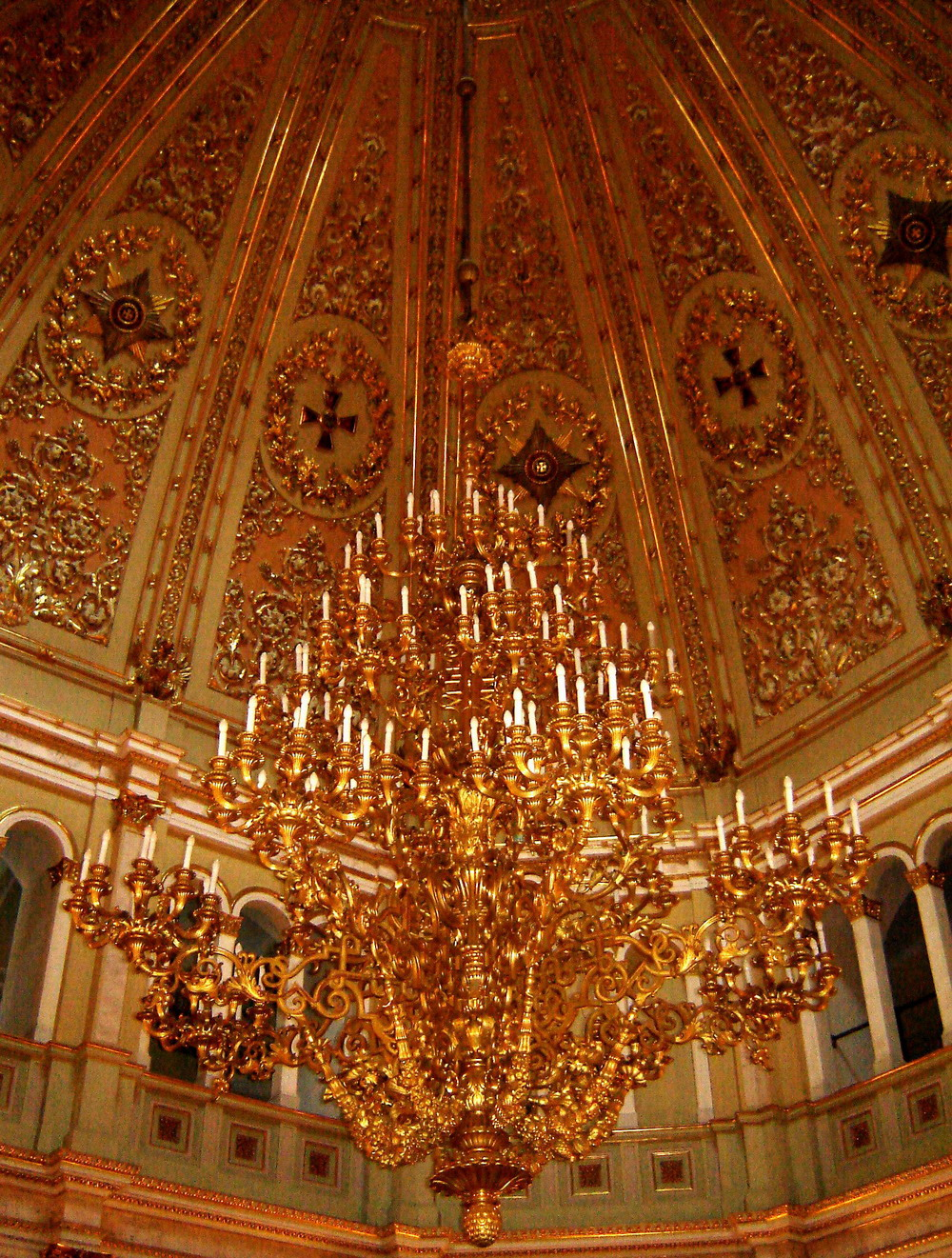
Chandelier in the Hall of the Order of St. Vladimir

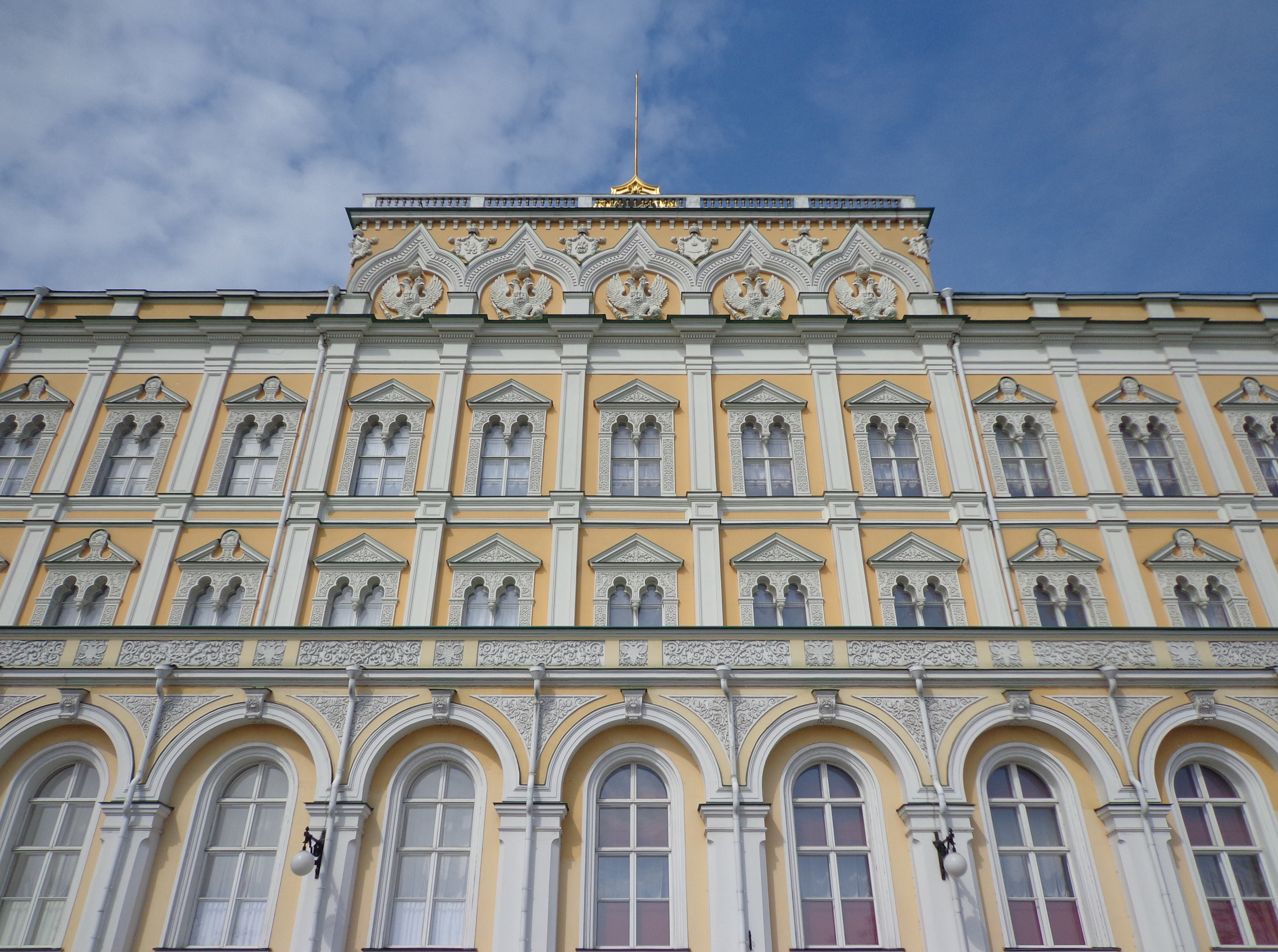
Second tier details characteristic of Russian-Byzantine style

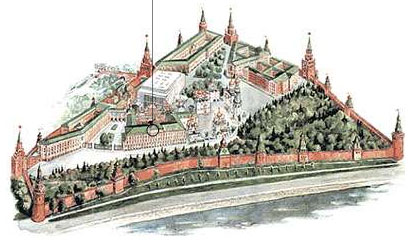
Overview map of Kremlin. Grand Kremlin Palace marked.

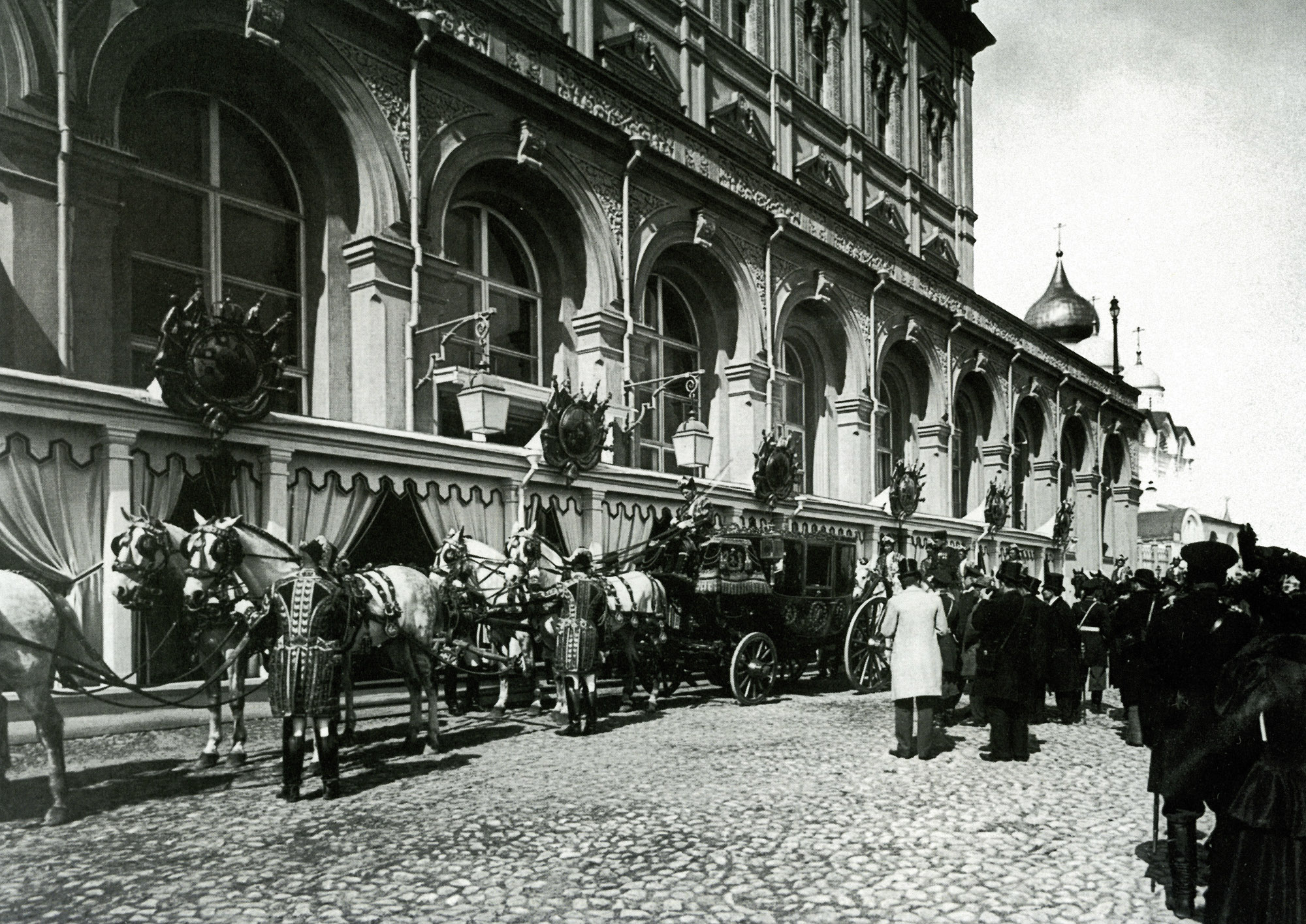
The royal coach of Nicholas II by the palace, 1896

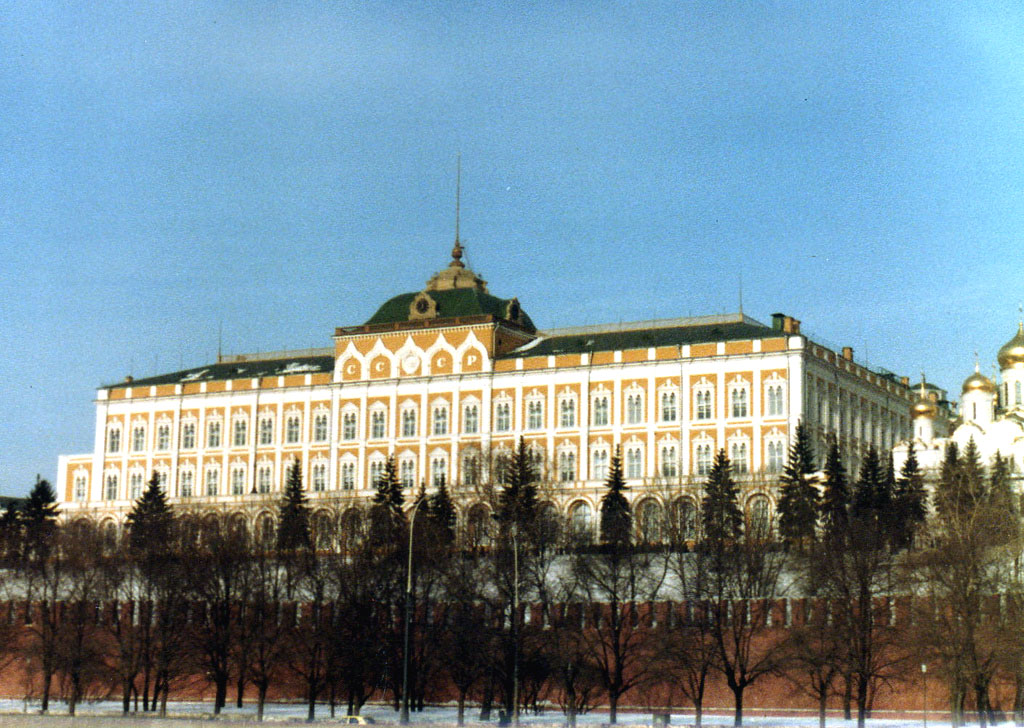
"СССР" and emblem of the Soviet Union embedded in the upper arches of the palace during Soviet era

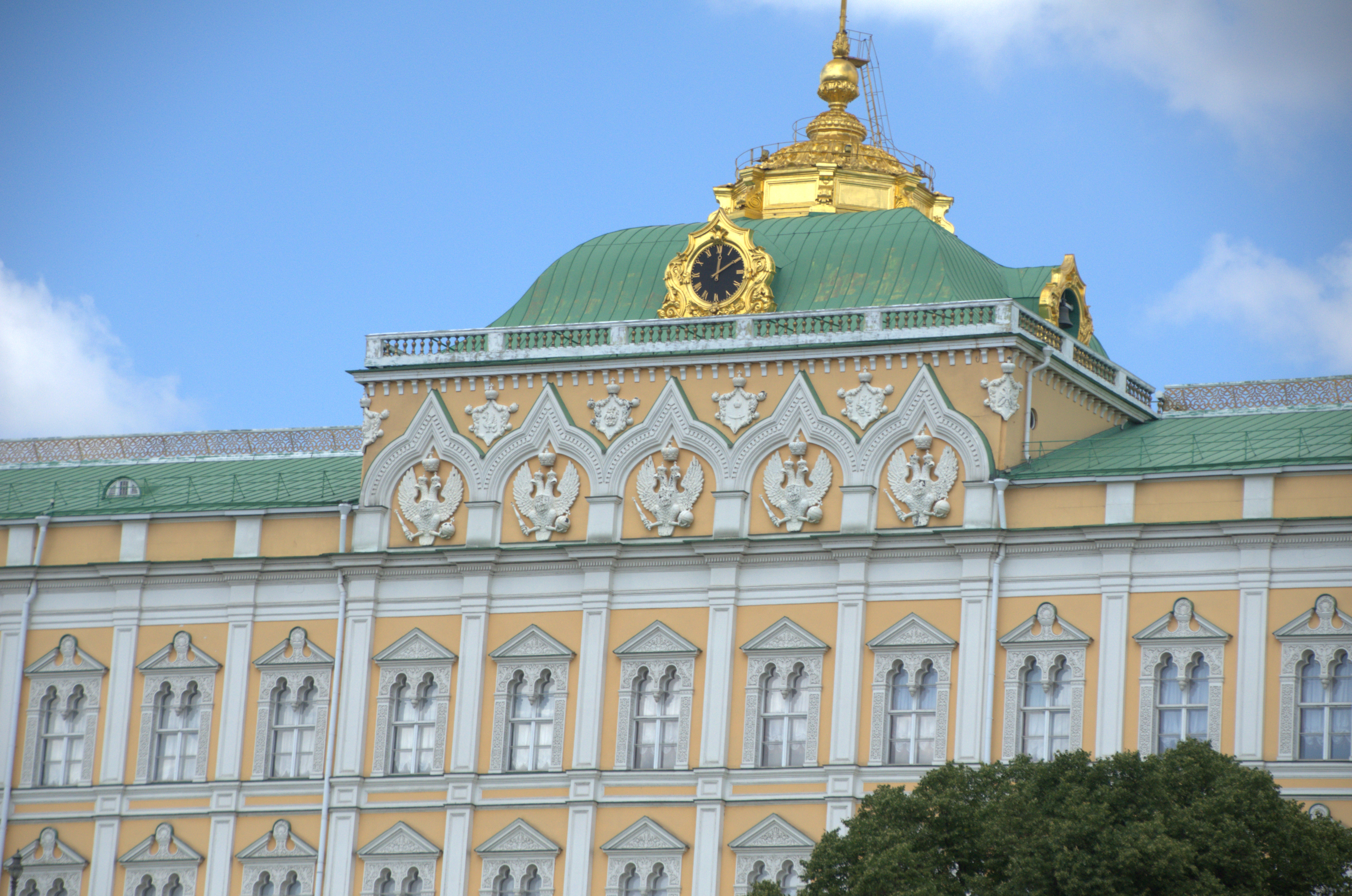
Coat of arms of Russia restored to the upper arches following the dissolution of the Soviet Union
