= Lonely Accordion =

Song
- Language: Russian
- Published: 1946
- Genre: Romantic song
- Composer: Boris Mokrousov
- Lyricist: Mikhail Isakovsky

Lonely Accordion (Russian: Одинокая гармонь) is a song by the composer Boris Mokrousov. The song is written in a poem by Mikhail Isakovsky.

Text of the song, the poet Mikhail Isakovsky wrote in 1945, soon after the war. The first song for these verses was written by composer Vladimir Zakharov and was called Harmonist. It was performed by the Pyatnitsky Choir, but did not receive significant fame.

The Song was performed by Georg Ots, Sergey Lemeshev, Efrem Flaks, Georgy Abramov, Victor Vuyachich, Gleb Romanov, Lyudmila Lyadova and Nina Panteleyeva, Vera Vasilyeva and Nikolai Rybnikov, Yury Okhochinsky, Alena Sviridova, Nikolai Nikitsky, Dmitry Khvorostovsky, Valentina Tolkunova, Eduard Khil, Vladimir Troshin, Lyudmila Gurchenko and others. In the performance of Alexander Krivik, the song sounded in the 1956 film The Rumyantsev Case.

The song has been translated into many languages (German, French, English). Under the name fr. Joli mai (Beautiful May) with other words it was performed by Yves Montand. It was included in documentary film "Le Joli Mai".
