= Mikhail Isakovsky =

Russian Soviet poet (1900–1973)

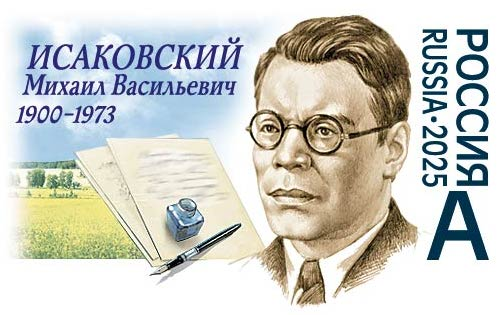
- Mikhail Isakovsky
- Born: 19 January 1900; Glotovka village, Smolensk Governorate, Russian Empire
- Died: 21 July 1973 (aged 73); Moscow, Russian SFSR, Soviet Union
- Occupations: Poet, lyricist, translator, editor
- Writing career
- Notable works: "Katyusha" "Lonely Accordion" "Enemies burnt the dear house down"

Mikhail Vasilyevich Isakovsky (Russian: Михаи́л Васи́льевич Исако́вский; 19 January [O.S. 7 January] 1900 – 20 July 1973) was a Soviet and Russian poet, lyricist and translator. Hero of Socialist Labour (1970).

== Biography ==
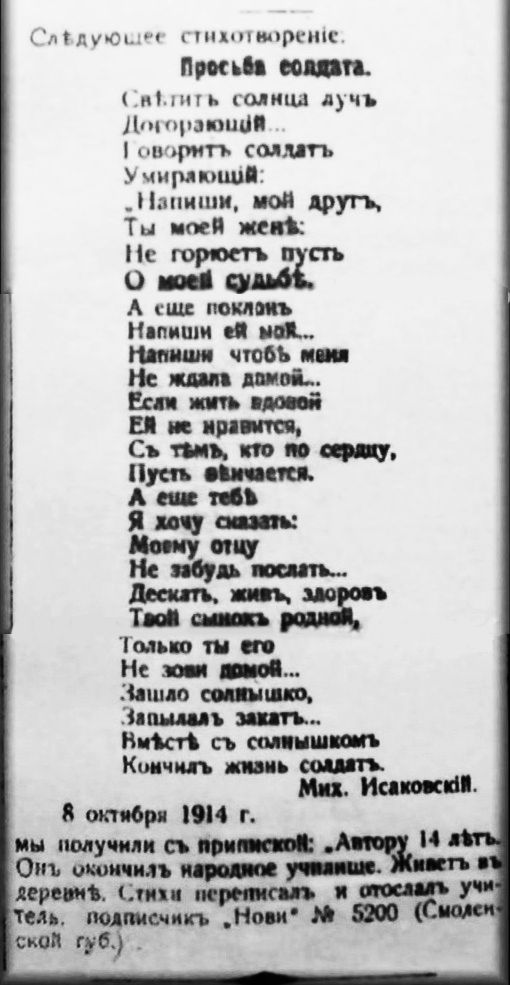
Mikhail Isakovsky's first rhyme Просьба солдата published in newspaper Nov (Новь). in 1914

Mikhail Isakovsky was born in Glotovka, Yelninsky Uyezd, Smolensk Governorate, to a poor peasant family of ethnic Russians. A local priest taught him to read and write. Later he studied at a gymnasium for two years. His first poem, Просьба солдата, was published in 1914 in Russian newspaper Nov (Новь). In 1918, he joined the Communist Party of the Soviet Union. From 1921 until 1931, he worked in Smolensk newspapers. In 1927, his first book of poems, Провода в соломе, was published. In 1931, he left for Moscow.

Many poems of Isakovsky are set to music. The most famous are "Katyusha (Катюша)" (music by Matvey Blanter), "The Enemy Burned My Native Hut (Враги сожгли родную хату)" (music by Matvey Blanter), "In the Frontier Forest (В лесу прифронтовом)", and "Migrant Birds Fly (Летят перелётные птицы)", and "Lonely Accordion (Одинокая гармонь)". His songs "What You Were Is What You Are (Каким ты был, таким ты и остался)" and "Oh, Arrowwood Is Blooming (Ой, цветет калина)", set to music by Isaak Dunayevsky, were used in the film Cossacks of the Kuban (Кубанские казаки) (1949).

The song "The Enemy Burned My Native Hut (Враги сожгли родную хату)" (1945) was officially criticized for "pessimism" and was not printed or sung until 1956.

As a result of cooperation with Vladimir Zakharov, Isakovsky's poems set to music appear in the repertoire of the Pyatnitsky Choir. The most widely known of them are "Along the Village (Вдоль деревни)", "Seeing Off (Провожанье)" and "You Can Never Tell (И кто его знает)". According to Alexandra Permyakova, chief musician of the Pyatnitsky Choir, these songs made the Choir famous.

He twice received the Stalin Prize for his songwriting (1943, 1949). In 1970, he was awarded the title of Hero of Socialist Labour. He was also awarded four Orders of Lenin, in addition to other orders and medals.

He also published a book on the subject of poetry, О поэтическом мастерстве ('On Poetic Mastery').

Mikhail Isakovsky died in Moscow on 20 July 1973, and he was buried in the Novodevichy Cemetery.
