= List of songs about Moscow =

Part of a series on Moscow
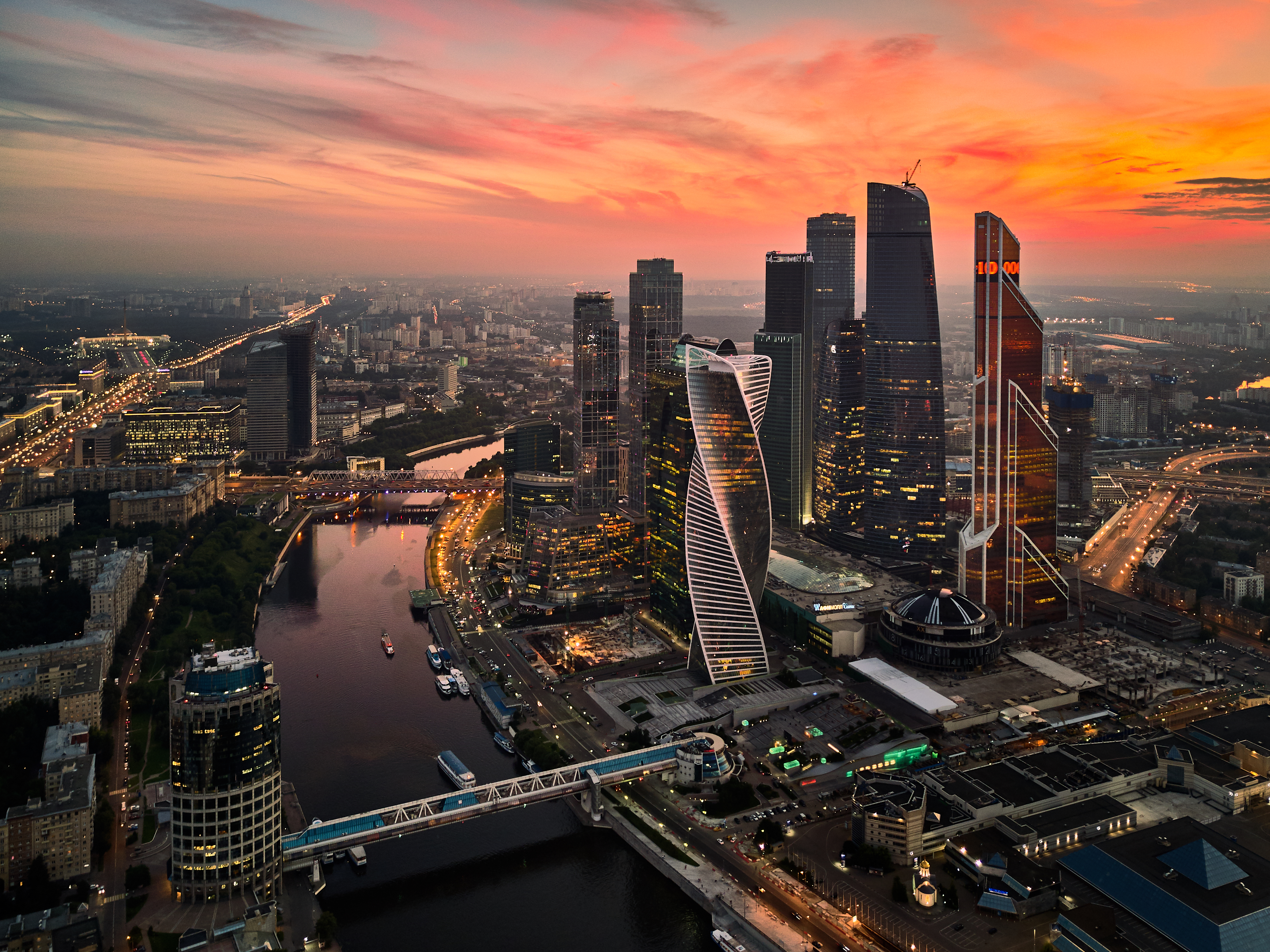
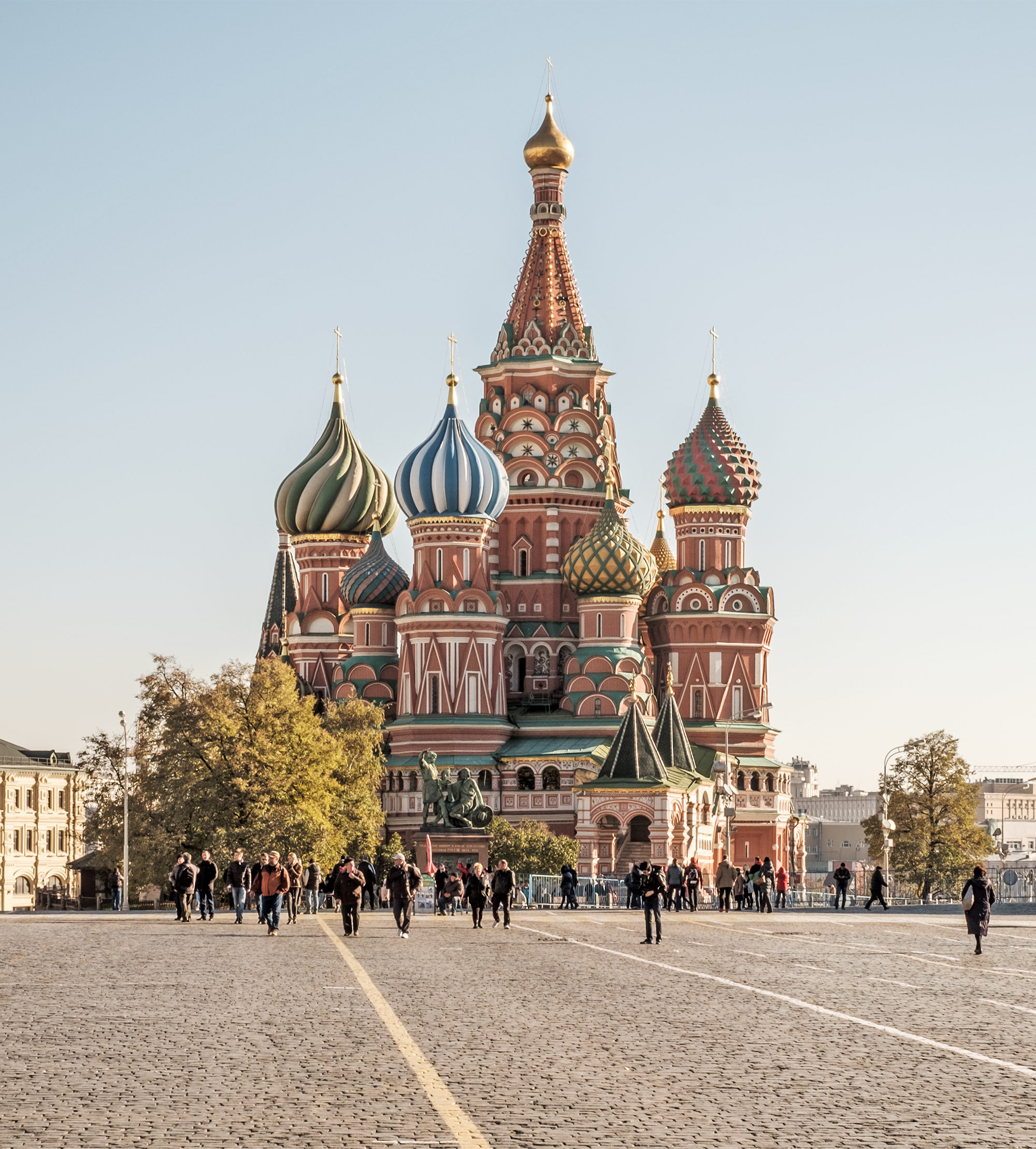

Political
- History; Timeline; Government; Mayor; Administrative divisions

Places
- Attractions; Bridges; Churches; Hotels; Kremlin towers; Metro stations; Monuments/Memorials; Museums; Tallest buildings

People
- People; Ethnic groups; Jews

Miscellaneous
- Songs; Time; Climate; Transport; Football; 1980 Olympics

This article lists songs about Moscow, which are either set there or named after a location or feature of the city. As some songs are written without lyrics, the following list arrange them not by language, instead, the list is arranged by the song's release country or by the base of its singers, both of which designates the song's targeted audience.

== Australia ==
- "Moscow's In Love" by Rolf Harris

== Austria ==
- "Kissing in the Kremlin" by Falco
- "Moscow Belles" by Hugo Felix and Anne Caldwell

== Belgium ==
- "Maybe To Moscow" by Ferre Grignard
- "Moskow Diskow" by Telex
- "Moscow Nights" by Helmut Lotti

== Canada ==
- "Moscow Drug Club" by B.B. Gabor from his album B. B. Gabor (1980)

== Denmark ==
- "Moscow Ballerina" by Sir Henry and his Butlers

== Finland ==
- "Moskova" by Paula Koivuniemi

== France ==
- "Carnaval de Moscou" (instrumental) by Dimitri Dourakine
- "Dizzidence politik" by Indochine
- "Souvenir de Moscou" by Henryk Wieniawski

== Germany ==
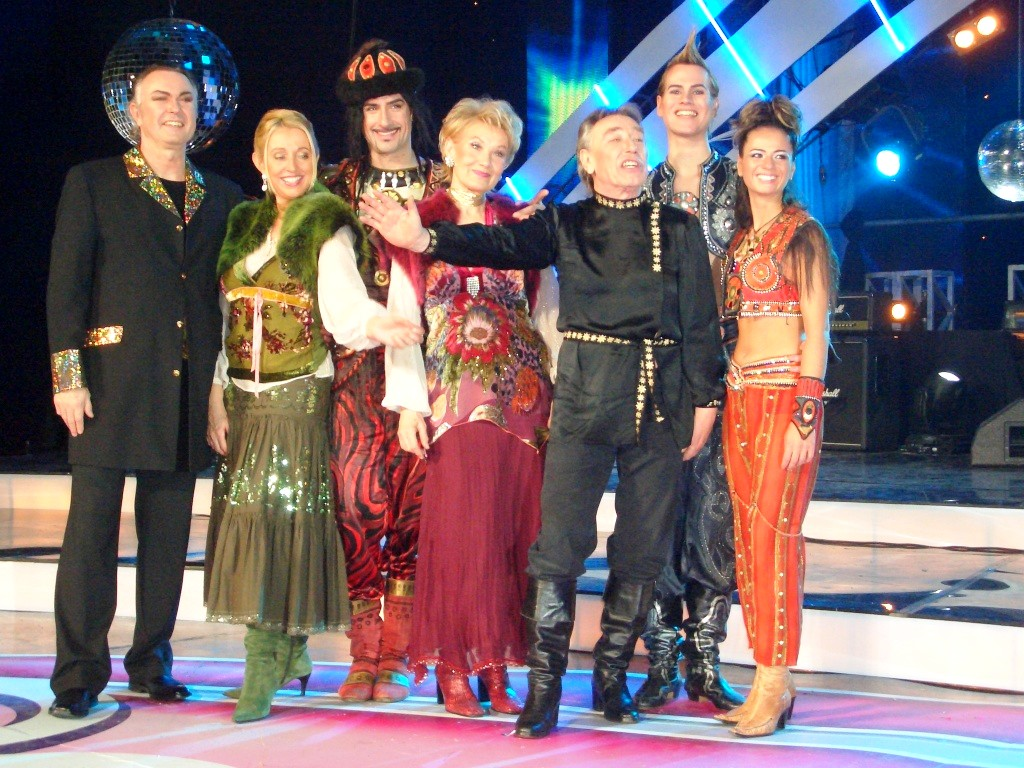
The German band Dschinghis Khan sung its signature song "Moskau" (1979) at the Moscow reunion concert, 2005

- "Auch In Moskau Weint Man Tränen" by Dagmar Koller
- "Crown From Moscow" by Kingdom Come
- "Fly To Moscow" by Modern Trouble
- "Melodie Der Nacht (Mitternacht In Moskau)" by Ivan Rebroff
- "Moskau (Moscow)" by Dschinghis Khan
- "Moskau" by Rammstein
- "Moskau" by Udo Lindenberg
- "Moskauer Nächte" by Hazy Osterwald
- "Moscow" by Achim Reichel
- "Moscow Is Calling" by Fancy
- "Moscow Nights" by Sandra
- "One Summernight In Moscow" by Patty Ryan and Systems In Blue
- "Rasputin" by Boney M
- "Wind of Change" by Scorpions

== Japan ==
- "Mezase Moskva" (めざせモスクワ) by 8bit Project (includes Hideki Matsutake)

== Italy ==
- "Moscow (Giardini)" hymn tune by Felice Giardini

== Netherlands ==
- "Moscovite Musquito" by Clan of Xymox
- "Moscow Street Rock" by Olav Basoski

== Russia ==
- Arias from the operetta Moscow, Cheryomushki by Dmitri Shostakovich
- "Eh, Moscow" by Lyube
- "Moon Over Moscow" by Ambros Seelos
- "Moscow" a cantata by Tchaikovsky
- "Moscow" by Mongol Shuudan
- "Moscow" by Vintage & DJ Smash
- "Moscow" by Oleg Gazmanov
- "Moscow at 3 A.M." by Igor Butman
- "Moscow Calling" by Gorky Park
- "Moscow Never Sleeps" by DJ Smash
- "Moscow Nights" by Vasily Solovyov-Sedoi & Mikhail Matusovsky
- "Moscow Does Not Believe in Tears" by Valeriya
- "Moscow-Peking" by Alexandrov Ensemble
- "My Moscow", Anthem of the City of Moscow
- "Podmoskovnye Vechera" or "Moscow nights \ Nights under Moscow" (Russian traditional)
- "The Best City in the World" by Muslim Magomayev
- "March of the Defenders of Moscow" by Alexey Surkov & Boris Mokrousov

== South Korea ==
- "Moscow Moscow" by ONF

== Spain ==
- "Moscú" by Georgie Dann

== Sweden ==
- "Moscow" by The Spotnicks
- "Lost In Moscow" by Last Autumn's Dream
- "Red Square" (instrumental) by Triangulus, Björn J:son Lindh

== Trindad and Tobago ==
- "New York to Moscow" by Jimmy James Ross

== Ukraine ==
- "Kiev-Moscow" by NuAngels

== United Kingdom ==
- "Assignment Moscow" by London Studio Group (featuring Basil Kirchin)
- "Back In The USSR" by The Beatles
- "The Blues In Moscow" by Ram John Holder
- "Blue Skies In Red Square" by Demon
- "Calling Moscow" by Cabaret Voltaire
- "Calling On Moscow" by Propaganda
- "Disco in Moscow" by The Vibrators (1979–80; a German version was done by Damenwahl)
- "For What It's Worth" by Oui 3
- "(From Russia With Love) Little Moscow" by Thomas Lang (singer)
- "Girl In Moscow" by Nick Plytas
- "Gorky Park" by Time Of The Mumph (house music)
- "I Speaka Da Lingo" by Black Lace
- "Indians In Moscow" by Indians In Moscow
- "Last Tango In Moscow" by Angelic Upstarts
- "Man From Moscow" by The Membranes
- "Mary Malone Of Moscow" by Dr. Strangely Strange
- "Massive Retaliation" by Sigue Sigue Sputnik
- "Midnight In Moscow" by Kenny Ball & His Jazzmen
- "Moon Over Moscow" by Visage
- "Moscow" by Future Sound Of London
- "Moscow" by Geoff Downes & The New Dance Orchestra
- "Moscow" by Gracie Fields
- "Moscow" by Orange Juice
- "Moscow, Idaho" by The Cassandra Complex
- "Moscow Motion" by Positive Noise
- "Moscow Mule" by Skeewiff
- "Moscow Nights" by Anya (she was also the model on Elton John's 'Nikita' video)
- "Moscow Rules" by B. A. Robertson
- "Moscow Underground" by Simple Minds
- "Oh Moscow" by Lindsay Cooper
- "Radio Africa" by Latin Quarter
- "Radio Moscow" by Moloko
- "Radio Free Moscow" by Jethro Tull
- "Red Square" by The Cougars
- "Red Square" by Kenny Ball
- "Red Square - Gagarinesk" by Courtney Pine
- "Roads to Moscow" by Al Stewart
- "Rockit Miss USA" by Sigue Sigue Sputnik
- "Said She Was A Dancer" by Jethro Tull
- "Star" by Erasure
- "Under Moscow Skies" by Frank Chacksfield

== United States ==
- "All the Way from Moscow" by Jesse Malin
- "An Evening In Moscow" by Louis Alter
- "Bosco Moscow Stomp" by BeauSoleil
- "Contact In Red Square" by Blondie
- "In Red Square" by The Bomb
- "Journey To Moscow" by Perry Botkin Jr.
- "Miniskirts In Moscow" by Bob Crewe Generation
- "Mission To Moscow" by Glenn Miller
- "Moscow Blues" by Paul Horn
- "Moscow Cha Cha Cha" by Kay Thompson
- "Moscow Mulski" by David Morales presents Red Zone
- "Moscow Nights" by The Feelies
- "Moscow Windows" by Ray Conniff
- "New Home In Moscow" by Henry Mancini
- "Night Train to Moscow" by Brazzaville
- "Night Train to Moscow" by The Toasters
- "Quarter To Three In Moscow" by Skip Battin Combo
- "Ray Conniff In Moscow" by Ray Conniff
- "The Red Arrow To Moscow" by John McEuen
- "Song For A Future Generation" by The B-52's
- "Storm The Embassy" by Stray Cats
- "Stranger in Moscow" - Michael Jackson
- "Surfin' U.S.S.R" by Ray Stevens
- "Too Bad (We Can't Go Back To Moscow)" (from Silk Stockings, 1957 film)
- ”Turbulence” by Warren Zevon
- "Walk Like An Egyptian" by The Bangles
