= Isaac Yakovlevich Pavlovsky =

Russian activist, journalist and writer

Isaac Yakovlevich Pavlovsky Исаак Яковлевич Павловский
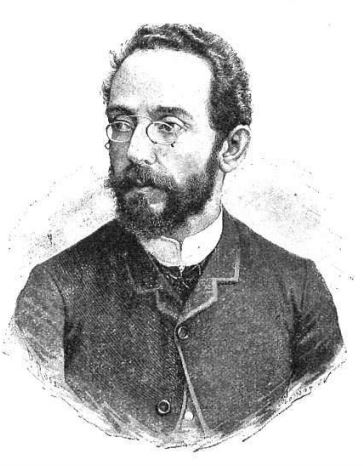
- Pavlovsky in 1886
- Born: 1853; Taganrog, Yekaterinoslav Governorate, Russian Empire
- Died: 1924 (aged 70–71); Paris, France
- Occupations: journalist, writer
- Writing career
- Pen name: Яковлев; Yakovlev

Isaac Yakovlevich Pavlovsky, a friend of Anton Chekhov, was born in 1853 in the city of Taganrog, studied at Taganrog's Boys Gymnasium, was an activist at the Taganrog revolutionary circle and was arrested and tried at the so-called Trial of the 193. He became a political immigrant in 1878. He made his debut as journalist in Le Temps in 1880 with the story about his imprisonment En Cellule.

In 1888, Isaac Pavlovsky returned to Russia and worked for the Novoye Vremya, where he published his Paris correspondence with his partner Wan Toe Ceevy.

Among his publications are: Little people with great sorrow ("Маленькие люди с большим горем", Saint Petersburg, 1889), Sketches of Contemporary Spain ("Очерки современной Испании", Saint Petersburg, 1889), There and Back ("Туда и обратно", Saint Petersburg, 1891), Paris Sketches ("Парижские очерки") and other works.
