= Efrem Flaks =

Soviet singer

Efrem Borisovich Flaks (Russian: Ефре́м Бори́сович Флакс; 15 January [O.S. 2 January] 1909 — 17 December 1982) was a Soviet bass singer. He was named a Meritorious Artist of the RSFSR in 1960. He graduated from the Leningrad Conservatory (vocal class) in 1936, from 1939 to 1942 and from 1950 to 1970 worked as a soloist at the Leningrad Philharmonia, and from 1943 to 1950 at the Leningrad Radio. He was the original performer of numerous songs by composers Vasily Solovyov-Sedoi, Matvey Blanter, and Boris Mokrousov, among others.
