= Wolkenstein (surname) =

Wolkenstein is a German language surname. Notable people with the name include:

- Julie Wolkenstein (1968), French writer
- Lev Philippovitch Wolkenstein (1858–1935), Russian jurist, lawyer and cadet
- Oswald von Wolkenstein (1377–1445), German poet, composer and diplomat
