= Chekhov Gymnasium =

Oldest gymnasium in the South of Russia

Coordinates: 47°12′54″N 38°55′17″E

Chekhov Gymnasium The Literary Museum named after Anton Chekhov
- Литературный музей им. А.П.Чехова
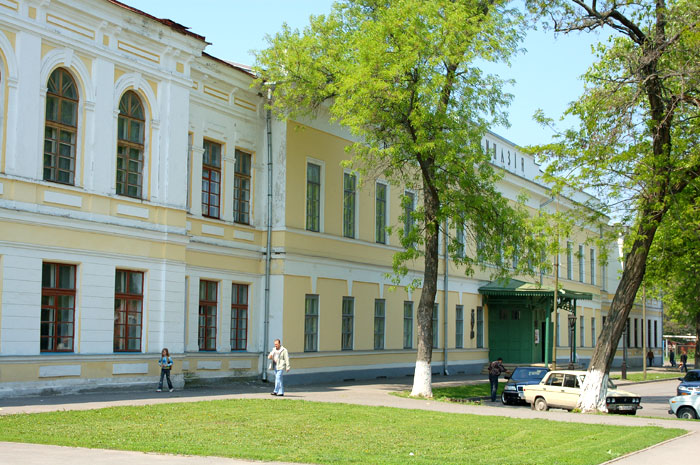
- Chekhov Gymnasium in 2006
- Established: 1809 (as gymnasium); 1975 (as museum)
- Location: Ulitsa Oktyabrskaya 9, Taganrog
- Collection size: Expositions related to Anton Chekhov's school years, theater plays by Chekhov (memorabilia, photographs)
- Directors: Yelizaveta Vasilievna Lipovenko; Липовенко, Елизавета Васильевна
- Public transit access: Spartakovsky Station (Street cars: 2,3,5,8,9)

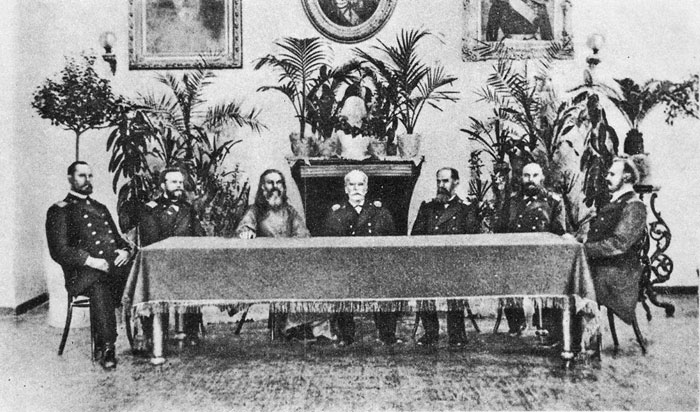
Teachers of the Boys Gymnasium at the stateroom.

The Chekhov Gymnasium (Russian: Гимназия имени А. П. Чехова, romanized: Gimnaziya imeni A. P. Chekhova) in Taganrog on Ulitsa Oktyabrskaya 9 (formerly Gymnasicheskaya Street) is the oldest gymnasium in the South of Russia. Playwright and short-story writer Anton Chekhov spent 11 years in the school, which was later named after him and transformed into a literary museum. Visitors can see Anton's desk and his classroom, the assembly hall and even the punishment cell which he sometimes visited.

== History of the school ==
The Boys Gymnasium was founded in 1809. Students of the Boys Gymnasium benefited from various grants. In the mid-1870s, a school chapel was built in the same building: the cross may be seen on some old postcards. After the Russian Revolution of 1917 and the following Russian Civil War (1917-1922), the building housed a cavalry school (6th Cavalry College).

During the Occupation of Taganrog in 1941-1943 used by the Germans as Sicherheitsdienst headquarters.

In 1954, the Boys Gymnasium was named after Anton Chekhov within the framework of events dedicated to the writer's 50th death anniversary memorial year.

In 1975 opened as The Literary Museum named after Anton Chekhov, more commonly known under the short name Chekhov Gymnasium.

January 29, 2010 President of Russian Federation Dmitri Medvedev held a meeting with representatives of the Russian and foreign theatrical communities in Taganrog at the stateroom of the Chekhov Gymnasium literary museum.

== School years of Anton Chekhov ==
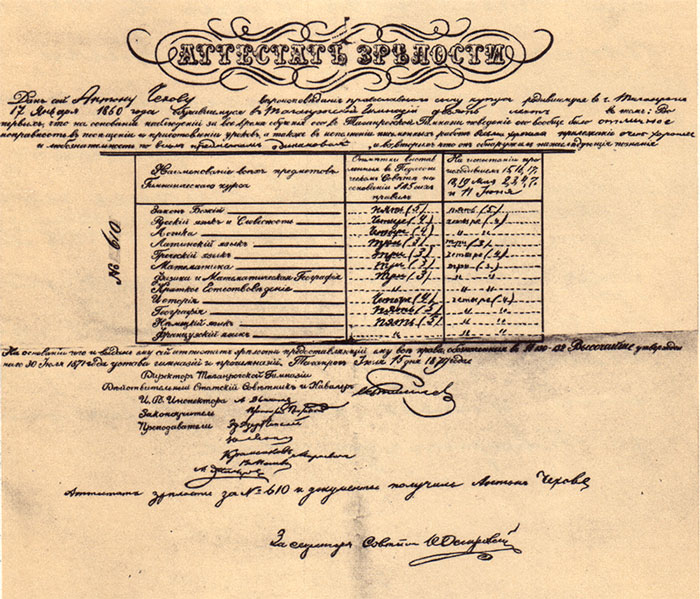
The school-leaving certificate of Anton Chekhov.

Anton Chekhov attended a school for Greek boys in Taganrog (1866–68), and at the age of eight he was sent to the local grammar school (gymnasium, then called the Taganrog Classical Gymnasium for Boys) where he proved an average pupil. As an adolescent he tried his hand at writing short "anecdotes," amusing or funny stories, although he is also known to have written a serious long play at this time, "Fatherless," which he later destroyed. He received an annual grant of 300 rubles which had been introduced by the Taganrog City Council after the failed assassination attempt on the tsar Alexander II of Russia.

After the business of Anton Chekhov's father failed, the whole family left for Moscow in 1875-1876. Anton was left in Taganrog to care for himself and finish school.In 1879, Chekhov passed his final exams and joined his family in Moscow, where he had obtained scholarship to study medicine at the Moscow University.

== Other famous graduates ==
- Nikolay Chekhov, artist
- Mikhail Chekhov, writer
- Alexander Chekhov, writer
- Dmitry Girs, writer
- Leonid Gobyato, Russian general, inventor of the first mortar
- Nikolay Sherbina, poet
- Ivan Martos, sculptor
- Alexander Leonidovich Vishnevsky, Russian and Soviet actor
- Valentin Parnakh, poet, founder of the Soviet Jazz music
- Isaac Yakovlevich Pavlovsky, journalist and writer
- Konstantin Savitsky, artist
- Vladimir Bogoraz, anthropologist and writer
- Samuel Maykapar, composer
- Nikolay Apollonovich Belelyubski, scientist, famous designer of bridges
- Osip Notovich, writer
- Andrei Grechko, Soviet general, Marshal of the Soviet Union (graduate of the Cavalry College)
- Ivan Golubets, the first Hero of the Soviet Union in the Black Sea Fleet
- Zinoviy Vysokovskiy, actor
- Sergey Zvantsev, writer
- Victor Dyomin, Soviet cinema critic, editor, writer
- Mikhail Basov, Russian media artist, documentary filmmaker.
- Kuzma Galitsky, Soviet army general
- Vladimir Grigoryevich Zakharov, Soviet composer, People's Artist of the USSR, art director of Pyatnitsky Choir
- Yakov Rubanchik, Soviet architect

== Museum ==
Today the Gymnasium is open to public as The Literary Museum named after Anton Chekhov (Литературный музей А.П.Чехова). After the Pushkin House museum in Saint Petersburg, this is the second-largest literary museum in Russia both in terms of space and unique funds. The exhibition includes the library that consists of the antique books of the time and books later sent by Anton Chekhov, his personal belongings, photographs, documents, autographs by Chekhov and other famous people - friends of the writer.

== Gallery ==
=== Exterior ===
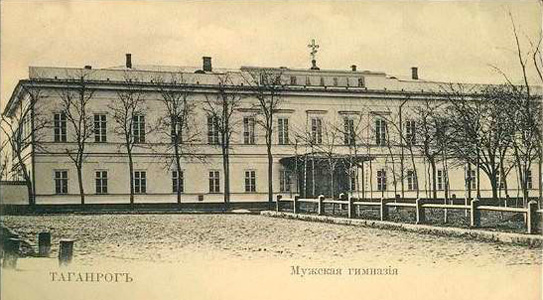
The Boys Gymnasium on an old postcard, late 19th century.

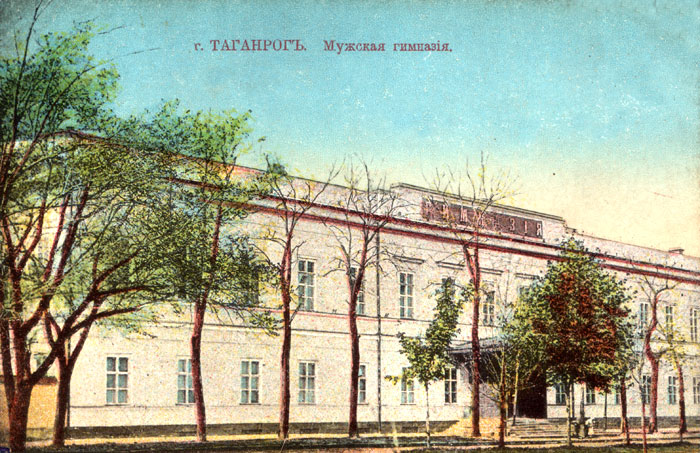
The Boys Gymnasium on an old postcard, late 19th century.

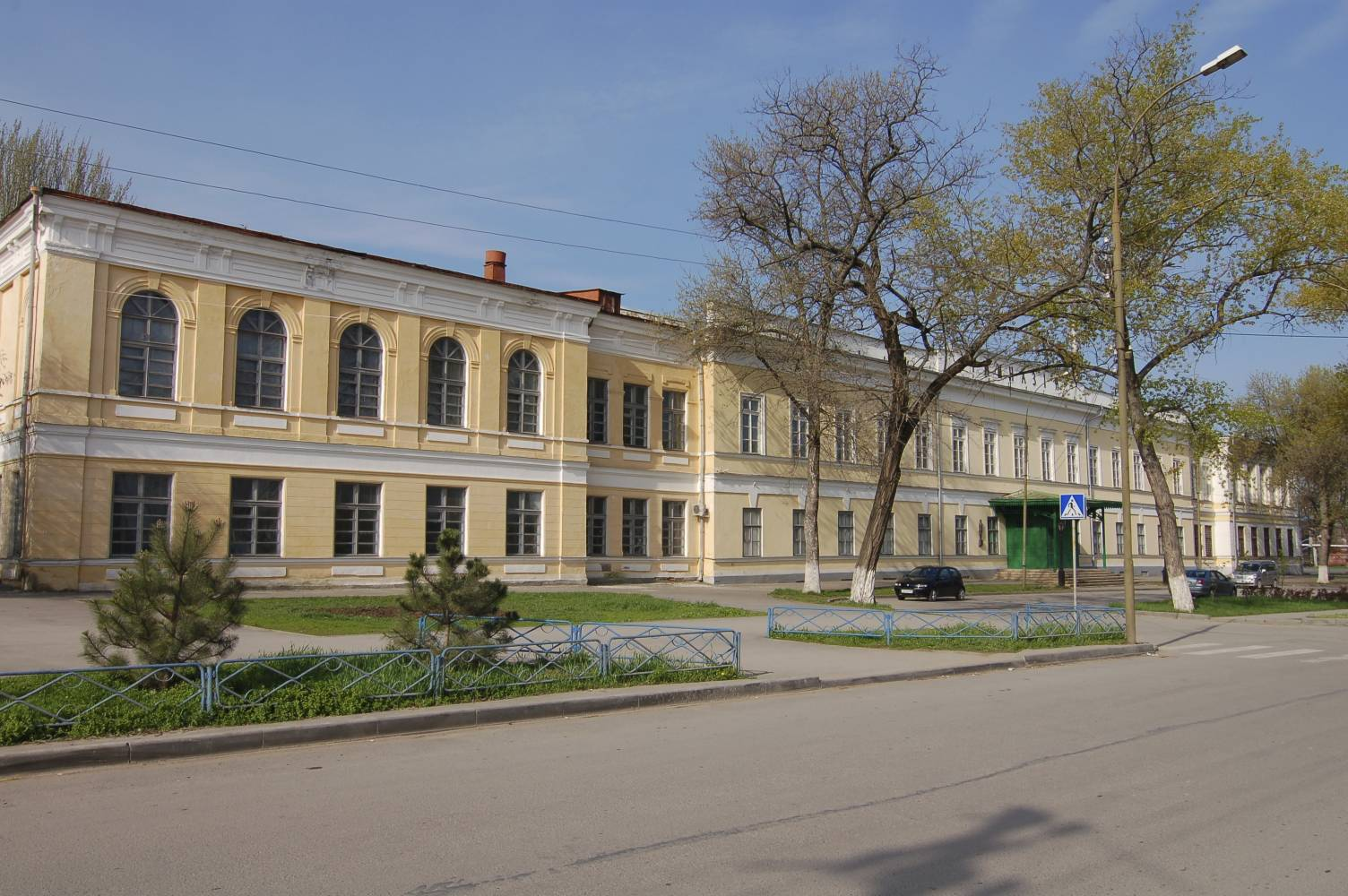
The Literary Museum Chekhov Gymnasium in 2008.

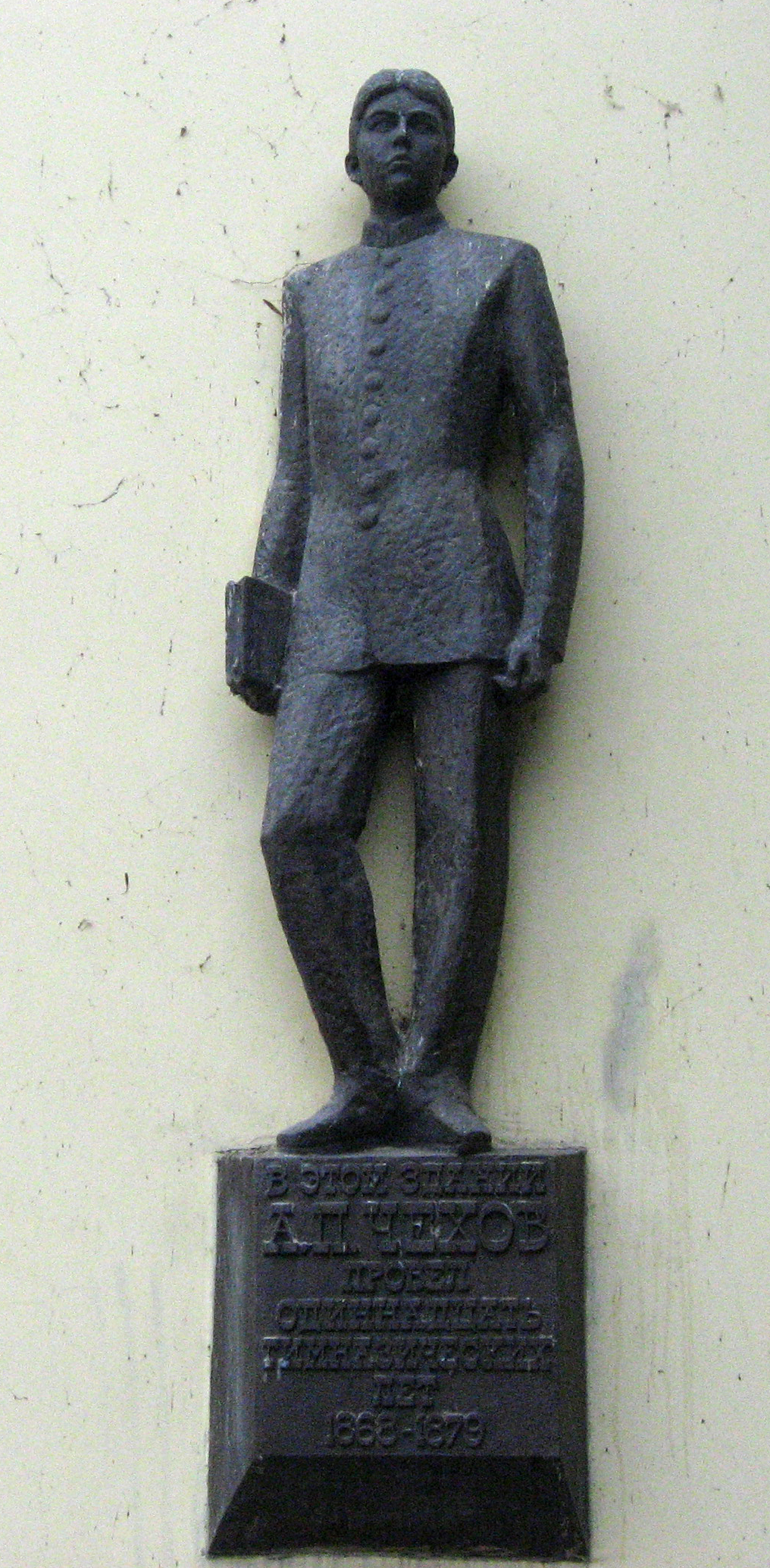
Anton Chekhov statue at the entrance of the gymnasium.

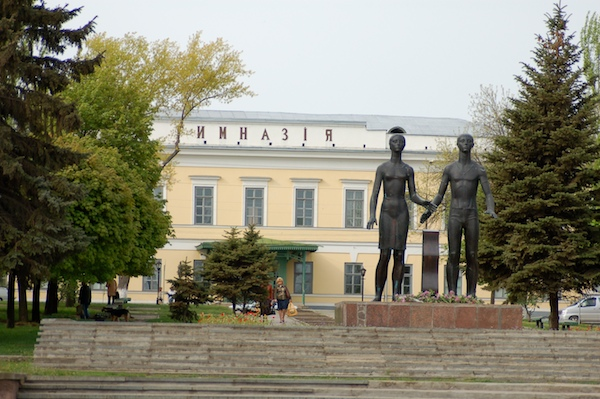
The Gymnasium as seen from the Spartakovsky Pereulok, with the Monument Oath of the Youth in front in 2007.

=== Inside the museum ===
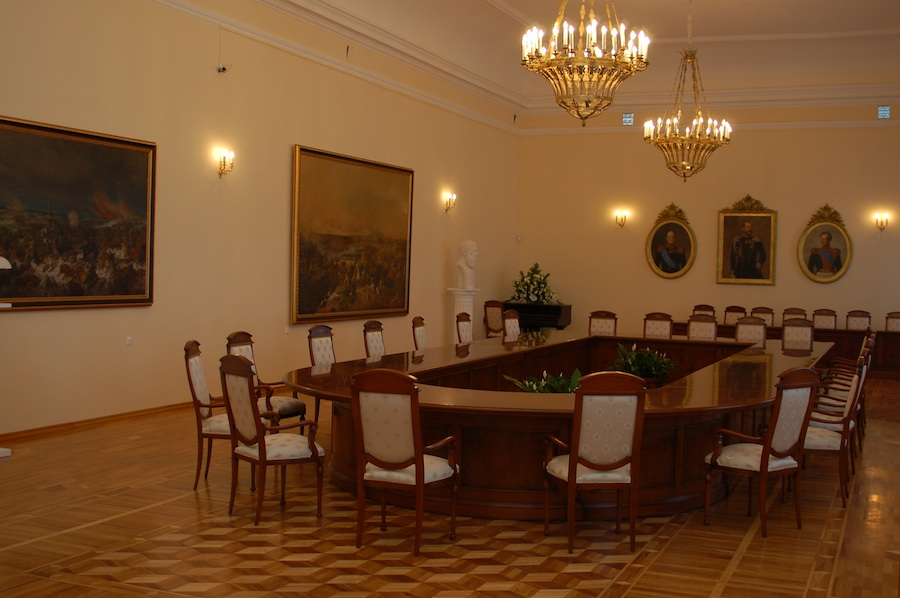
The stateroom at the Gymnasium on Jan.30, 2010 during the Chekhov's 150th birth anniversary celebrations.

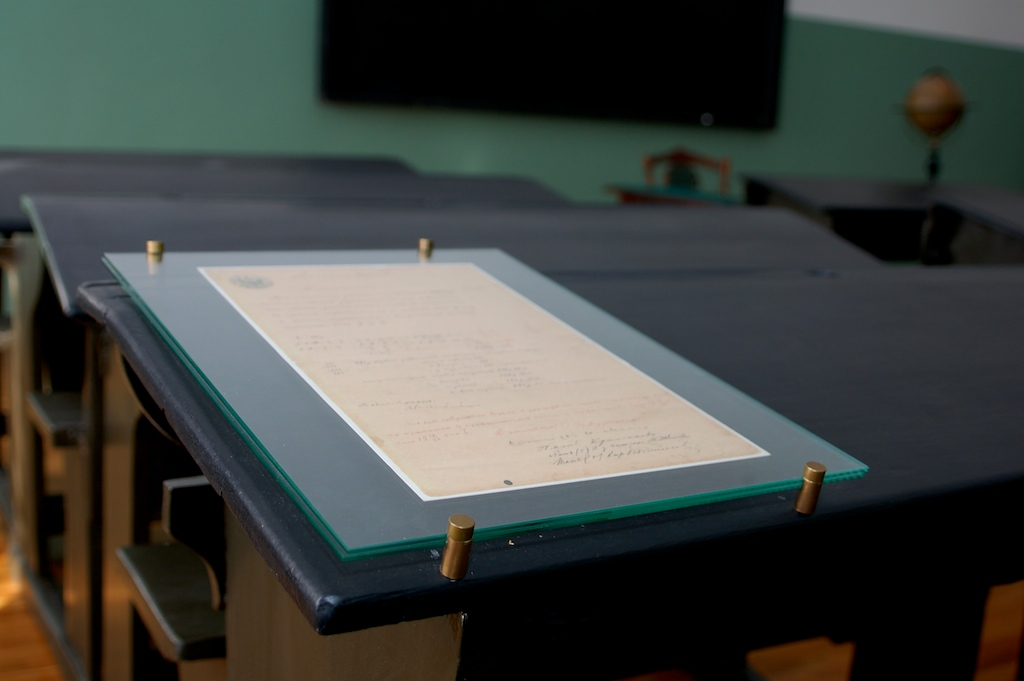
Chekhov's seat in the boys gymnasium. On the left is an original maths test checked by Anton Chekhov's mathematics teacher Edmund Dzerzhinsky.

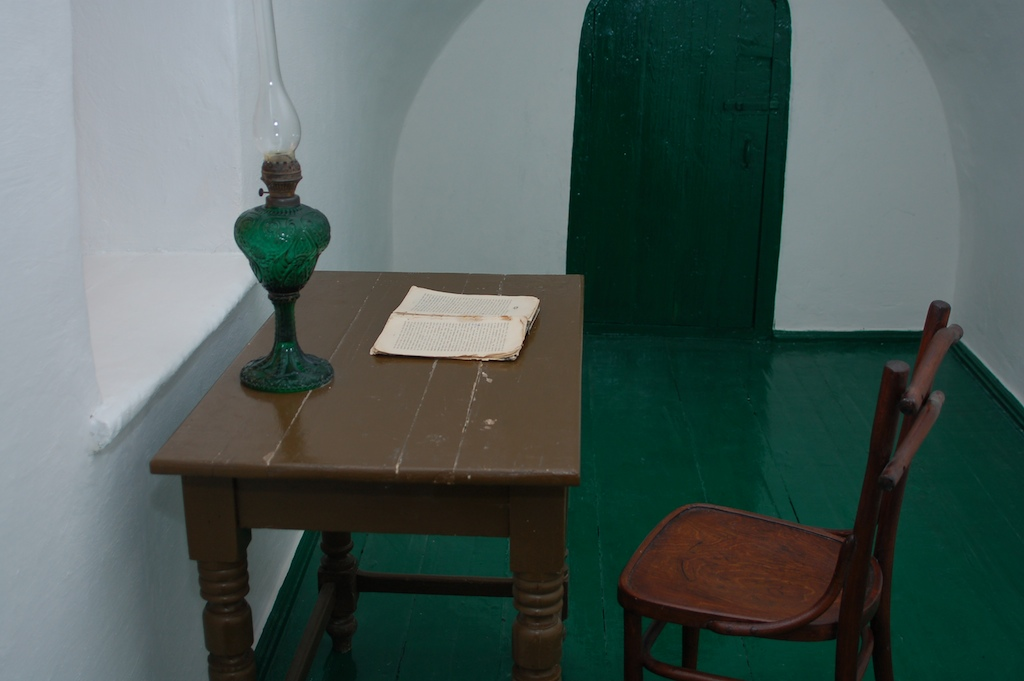
Punishment cell in the former Taganrog Boys Gymnasium, 2010

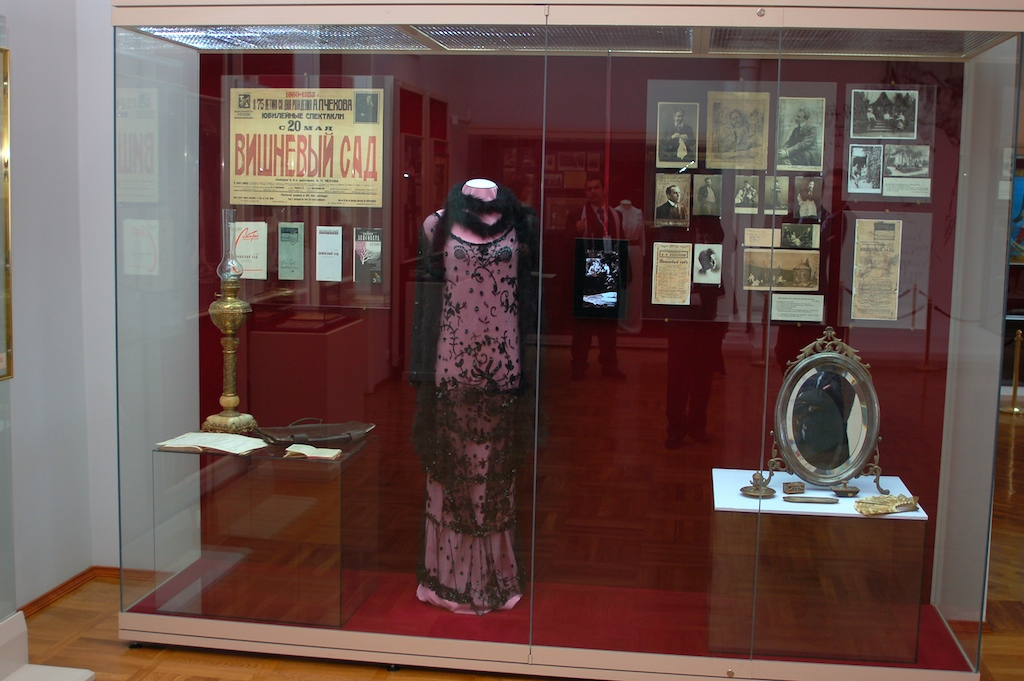
Memorabilia related to Anton Chekhov's The Cherry Orchard play

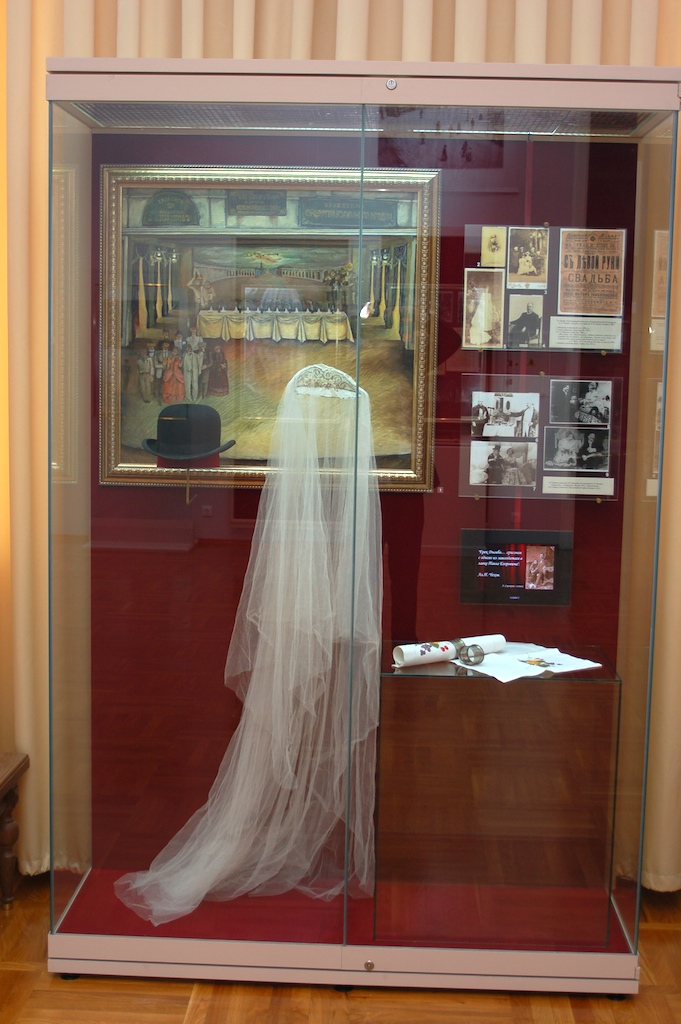
Memorabilia related to Anton Chekhov's play The Wedding

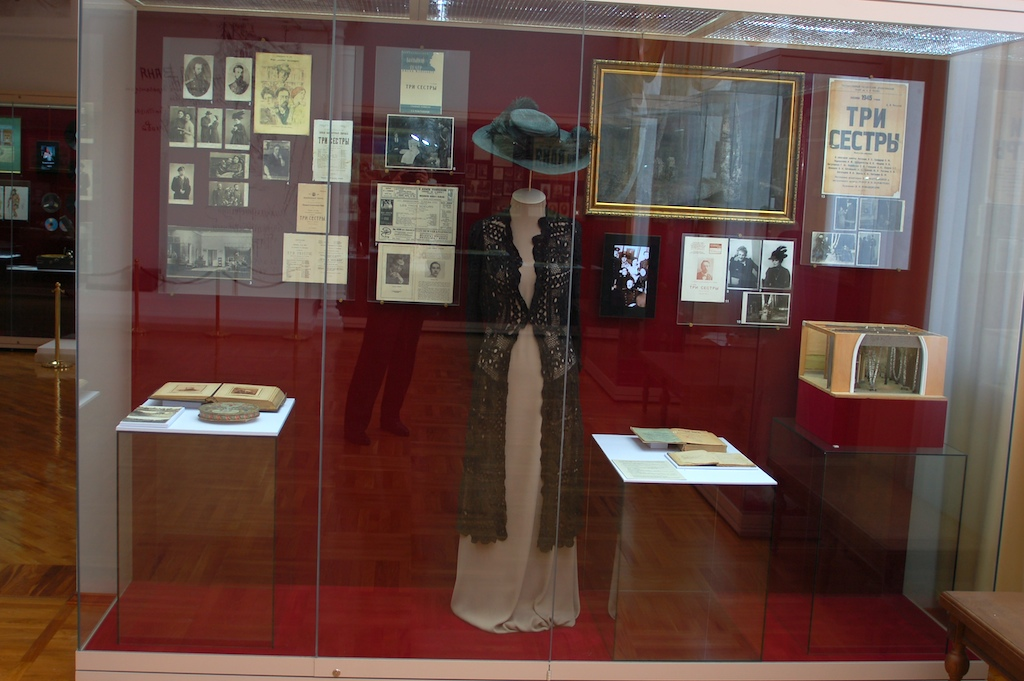
Memorabilia for Chekhov's play Three Sisters

== See also ==
- Mariinsky Girls' Gymnasium (Taganrog)
