= Katyusha (song) =

1938 Soviet song

Song
- Language: Russian
- Written: 1938
- Published: 1938
- Genre: Russian romance
- Composer: Matvey Blanter
- Lyricist: Mikhail Isakovsky

Audio sample
- "Katyusha": file; help

"Katyusha" (Russian: Катюша [kɐˈtʲuʂə]) is a Soviet-era war song about a girl bidding farewell to a soldier. It was composed by Matvey Blanter in 1938, with lyrics in Russian written by the Soviet poet Mikhail Isakovsky. It gained fame during World War II as a patriotic song, inspiring the population to serve and defend their land in the war effort.

The song is the source of the nickname of the BM-8, BM-13, and BM-31 "Katyusha" rocket launchers that were used by the Red Army in World War II.

== Song ==
The song is about a Russian woman named Katyusha (a tender form of "Ekaterina", i.e., Katherine). Standing on a steep riverbank, she sings a song to her beloved, a soldier serving far away. The theme of the song is that the soldier will protect the Motherland and its people while his grateful woman will keep and protect their love. Its lyrics became relevant when many Soviet men left their wives and girlfriends to serve in the Soviet Army during the Second World War, known in Russia as The Great Patriotic War.

The beginning portion of Blanter's melody is shown below.

== Performance history ==
The first official performance of the song was by Valentina Batishcheva in the Column Hall of Moscow's House of the Unions, at the State Jazz Orchestra concert in the autumn of 1938. Its popularity began to increase with the beginning of Operation Barbarossa launched by Germany against the Soviet Union. The song was sung by female students from a Soviet industrial school in Moscow, bidding farewell to soldiers going to the battle front against Nazi Germany. It has since been performed many times by other famous singers, including Lidia Ruslanova, Tamara Sinyavskaya, Georgi Vinogradov, Eduard Khil, Anna German, Ivan Rebroff, Dmitri Hvorostovsky, Joseph Kobzon and more. "Katyusha" is part of the repertoire of the Alexandrov Ensemble.

== In popular culture ==
The song briefly appears in the 1961 Japanese film A Soldier’s Prayer, the final entry in The Human Condition Trilogy.

== In other languages ==
In 1943, the Kingdom of Italy, until then one of the Axis powers, after signing the Armistice of Cassibile and the subsequent Operation Achse, joined the Allies. During the next two years, Italian partisans fought against German forces in Italy and the remnants of the Italian fascists. Felice Cascione wrote Italian lyrics for "Katyusha". His adaptation, Fischia il vento (The Wind Blows), became one of the most famous partisan anthems, along with Bella Ciao.

During the last battles on the Eastern Front, the Blue Division used the melody of "Katyusha" for an adaptation called Primavera (Spring), a chant extolling the value of Spanish francoist fighters.

During the Greek Civil War (1946–1949), Greek partisans who fought against the German invasion in 1941 wrote their version of "Katyusha" named Ο ύμνος του ΕΑΜ (The Hymn of EAM). The text to the melody was written by Vassilis Rotas, recorded much later by Thanos Mikroutsikos and sung by Maria Dimitriadi.

Katyusha is also a popular song sung in the People's Republic of China due to influence from the Soviet Union in the second half of the 20th century and is still widely popular. During the 2015 Moscow Victory Day Parade, the Chinese honor guard contingent led by Li Bentao surprised hundreds of locals when they sang Katyusha during their march back to their living quarters during a nighttime rehearsal. That same parade saw the song being performed by the Massed Bands of the Moscow Garrison during the march of foreign contingents (specifically that of India, Mongolia, Serbia and China).

It is a popular song in Iceland (particularly among schoolchildren) where it is known as "Vertu til er vorið kallar á þig" ("Be Ready When Spring Calls You"); the lyrics by Tryggvi Þorsteinsson encourage hard work in the hayfields in spring.

== See also ==
- Music in World War II
