= Osip Notovich =

- Осип Нотович
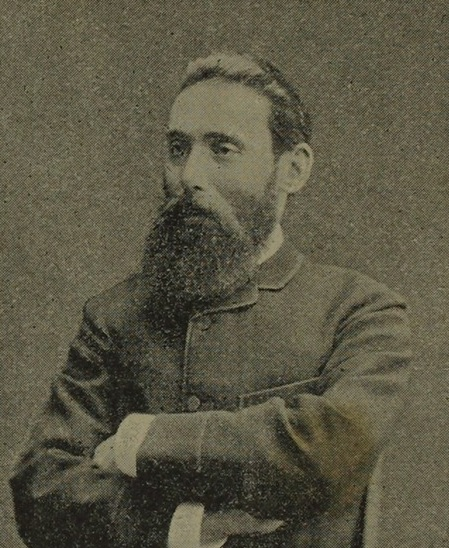
- Born: 1850; Taganrog, Russian Empire
- Died: 1914 (aged 63–64); Paris, France
- Occupations: writer, playwright
- Writing career
- Pen name: O'kvich

Osip Notovich was a Russian author, journalist, and publisher. He was born into a Jewish family in the city of Taganrog, studied at the Taganrog Boys' Gymnasium, and graduated from the law faculty of the Saint Petersburg University. In 1873-1874, he was the publisher and editor of the newspaper Novoe Vremya. In 1876 he acquired the newspaper Novosti, which he transformed into a political tribune.

== Career ==
Notovich was the author of Historical review of Russian publishing legislature ("Исторический очерк русского законодательства о печати"), which was published in Saint Petersburg in 1873 and 1893. He also published several philosophical essays, including "Some philosophy" ("Немножко философии", 1886), "Some more philosophy" ("Еще немножко философии", 1886), and "Love and beauty" ("Любовь и Красота", 1888), that were later translated into German and French.

In 1874, Notovich published the popular History of Civilization in England by Henry Thomas Buckle. As a playwright, his works included Marriage and Divorce or Transitional Times ("Брак и развод" или "Переходное время"), Shady Business ("Темное дело"), Daughter ("Дочь"), No Exit ("Без выхода"), Surprise ("Сюрприз"), and The Rejected ("Отверженный"). Some of these plays were staged in theaters in Saint Petersburg and Moscow.
