= Victor Dyomin =

Victor Dyomin Виктор Дёмин
- Born: 8 May 1937; Taganrog, USSR
- Died: 19 June 1993 (aged 56); Moscow, Russia
- Occupations: Actor, editor, writer
- Years active: 1960–1993

Victor Petrovich Dyomin (Russian: Виктор Петрович Дёмин; 1937–1993) was a Soviet cinema critic, editor, screen writer.

== Biography ==
Victor Dyomin was born in the city of Taganrog in 1937. Graduated from Chekhov Gymnasium (1954) and VGIK (1960). Bachelor of arts (1973). Since 1986 – secretary of the board of the Union of Cinematographers of USSR. In 1987, he was a member of the jury at the 37th Berlin International Film Festival. Chief editor of the magazine Soviet Screen (1989–1993).

== Publications ==
- Фильм без интриги. – М.: Искусство, 1966. – 220 с.
- Жан Марэ. Человек, актёр, миф, маска. – М.: Искусство, 1969. – 240 с.
- Первое лицо: художник и экранные искусства. – М.: Искусство, 1977. – 287 с.
- Стареют ли фильмы? – М.: БПСК, 1978. – 56 с.
- Воспитание чувств. – М., 1980.
- Кино в системе искусств // Встречи с X музой: Беседы о киноискусстве: Для учащихся старших классов. Кн. 1. – М.: Просвещение, 1981. С.108–166.
- Как делаются фильмы // Встречи с X музой: Беседы о киноискусстве: Для учащихся старших классов. Кн. 2. – М.: Просвещение, 1981. С.4–78.
- Человек на земле. – М., 1982.
- Витаутас Желакявичус: Портрет режиссёра. – М.: Союзинформкино, 1982. – 32 с.
- Виталий Мельников: Три беседы с режиссёром. – М.: ВБПК, 1984. – 144 с.
- Поговорим о кино. – М.: Знание, 1984. – 63 с.
- Эльдар Рязанов: Творческий портрет. – М.: Союзинформкино, 1984. – 40 с.
- Встречи на опалённой земле. – М., 1985.
- Массовые виды искусства и современная художественная культура / Под редакцией Дёмина. – М., 1986.
- Георгий Данелия. – М., 1986.
- Глеб Панфилов. – М., 1986.
- Сергей Соловьёв. – М., 1987.
- Виктор Проскурин: Счастье быть актёром. – М.: Киноцентр, 1988. – [64] с.
- Леонид Марягин: Коллеги и друзья в рассказах режиссёра и портрет самого режиссёра, увиденный критиком. – М.: Союзинформкино, 1988. – 32 с.
- Алоиз Бренч: Творческий портрет. – М., 1990.
- Леонид Ярмольник. – М., 1991.

== Filmography ==
screen writer

- Public Enemy Bukharin (1990)
- Was There Karotin? (1989)
- The Traitress (1977)
- Hamerg Voskan papi hamar (1976)
- Inspiration (1976)

actor

- Soccer Player (1990)
- Expensive Pleasure (1988)
- Dead Souls (1984)
