= Sergey Zvantsev =

- Александр Исаакович Шамкович
- Born: Alexander Isaakovich Shamkovich; November 2, 1893; Taganrog, Don Host Oblast, Russian Empire
- Died: June 15, 1973 (aged 79); Rostov on Don, USSR
- Occupations: short story writer, playwright
- Writing career
- Pen name: Сергей Званцев; Sergey Zvantsev

Sergey Zvantsev (November 2, 1893 – June 15, 1973) was a Soviet writer, playwright and feuilletonist.

== Biography ==
Born as Alexander Shamkovich on November 2, 1893 in the city of Taganrog in the family of doctor Isaak Shamkovich. His father studied at Taganrog Boys' Gymnasium in the same class with Anton Chekhov and shared the same school desk. Alexander Shamkovich also studied at the Taganrog Boys' Gymnasium and entered the law faculty of Kharkiv University, which he graduated from in 1916. Alexander Shamkovich published his first feuilleton in the newspaper Priazovksy Kray in 1912. The first book published under the name of Sergey Zvantsev was the feature story Taganrog's Delegate on the famous steelworker Nikolai Dygai. Zvantsev's feuilletons were published in satirical magazine Krokodil, in Literaturnaya Gazeta and many more. His miniatures were included in the satirical TV series Fitil. Sergey Zvantsev published many stories dedicated to Taganrog before October Revolution.

== Publications ==
1. Депутат Таганрога. — Ростов-на-Дону: Ростиздат, 1939.
2. Каракулевые шкурки (библ. журн. "Крокодил"). — М.: Правда, 1956.
3. Рассказы о героях. — Ростов-на-Дону: Ростиздат, 1957.
4. Разное смешное. — Ростов-на-Дону: Ростиздат, 1957
5. Дело Вальяно. — Ростов-на-Дону: Ростиздат, 1959.
6. Клевета. — М.: Госюриздат, 1959.
7. Золотая бабушка. — Ростов-на-Дону: Ростиздат, 1960.
8. Гибель проессии. — Ростов-на-Дону: Ростиздат, 1961.
9. Рассказы с улыбкой. — М.: Сов. писатель, 1962.
10. Никакого шпионажа. — Ростов-на-Дону: Ростиздат, 1963.
11. САТИРА, ЮМОР. — Ростов-на-Дону: Ростиздат, 1963. — 428 с.
12. Включаем без предупреждения. — Ростов-на-Дону: Ростиздат, 1963.
13. Святые заступники. — М.: Политиздат, 1967.
14. Миллионное наследство. — М.: Сов. писатель, 1968.
15. По личному вопросу. — Ростов-на-Дону: Ростиздат, 1970.
16. Омоложение доктора Линевича. — Ростов-на-Дону: Ростиздат, 1974.
17. Были давние и недавние. — М.: Сов. писатель, 1974.
18. Частное лицо (библ. журн. "Крокодил"). — М.: Правда, 1974. — 48 с.
