= Alexey Surkov =

Soviet poet and critic

Alexey Alexandrovich Surkov
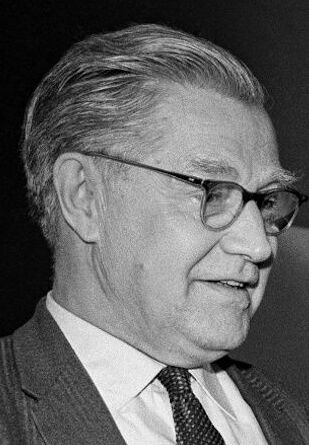
- 1963
- Born: October 13, 1899; Yaroslavl Province, Russian Empire
- Died: June 14, 1983 (aged 83); Moscow, USSR
- Occupations: poet, editor, literary critic
- Years active: 1925–1970s
- Spouse: Sofia Antonovna Krevs
- Awards: Stalin Prize (1946, 1951); Order of Lenin (1959, 1967, 1969, 1979); Order of the Red Star (1940, 1942); Order of the Red Banner (1945)

Alexey Alexandrovich Surkov (Russian: Алексе́й Алекса́ндрович Сурко́в; October 13, 1899 – June 14, 1983) was a Russian Soviet poet, editor, literary critic and high-profile nomenklatura figure, the head of the Soviet Union of Writers in 1953–1959, notorious for his role in the persecution of Boris Pasternak.

== Early career ==
Alexei Surkov was born in the village of Serednevo, in Yaroslavl region. At the age of 12 or 13, he was sent to work in a factory in St. Petersburg, where he joined the shipworkers' union after the February Revolution. He served in the Red Army for four years, during the Russian Civil War, and subsequently worked for Komsomol. He started publishing poetry in 1930, as a Komsomol activist and a member of the Russian Association of Proletarian Writers, who believed that soviet art should be politically committed and pro-communist. During a writers' meeting in April 1932, after Stalin had ordered RAPP and all other literary groups to disband and merge into a single writers' union, Surkov launched an attack on Boris Pasternak, calling him a "subjective idealist ... (for whom) the world is not outside us but inside us."

At the first First Congress of Soviet Writers in 1934, Surkov was the first speaker to be called to rebut the report on poetry delivered by Nikolai Bukharin, who had praised Pasternak. Surkov claimed that there was no such thing as "abstract craftmanship", that good poetry must have a Bolshevik tinge, and that Pasternak's work was "not a suitable compass point by which to chart our growth." Surkov own work has been described as "jingoistic verses, glorifying the heroism of the civil war. During the Great Purge, he wrote a poem vilifying Old Bolsheviks who had been forced to appear as defendants at the Moscow show trials, confessing to crimes that they had not committed. Surkov called for them to be executed.

Surkov, a war correspondent during the Great Patriotic War, took an active part in fighting at the Belorussian Front (1939) and later at Battle of Moscow, received numerous state awards, including the Orders of Red Banner and the Red Star (twice), four Orders of Lenin and two Stalin Prizes.

The author of numerous poetry books, he is best remembered for his poems that were adapted into songs: "The March of the Defenders of Moscow" (composer Boris Mokrousov, 1942), "Not a Step Back", T. A. Kuliyev, 1942), "The Song of the Brave Ones" (V. A. Bely, 1941) and, most famously, "Zemlyanka" (Konstantin Listov, 1941).

== Later career ==
Surkov was Chief Editor of Literaturnaya Gazeta in 1944–46. Despite his anxiety to follow the line set by the communist party, he was one of the few highly placed officials who recognised the genius of the poet, Anna Akhmatova. When she was attacked by Stalin's chief propagandist, Andrei Zhdanov Surkov had to apologise for having published an interview with her, and was removed from his position. Privately, he thanked Akhmatova's friend Nina Olshevskaya for taking her in when no one else in Moscow wanted to be seen with her. Later, as Chief Editor of Ogoniok in 1949–53, he published the verse cycle In Praise of Peace, which Akhmatova had written in the hope of achieving rehabilitation.

In October 1953, Surkov was appointed First Secretary of the Union of Soviet Writers. One of his first public pronouncements in this capacity was an article in Pravda in May 1954, in which he attacked the magazine Novy Mir and its editor Aleksandr Tvardovsky, and in August he presided over a writers' meeting to denounce the magazine for publishing works by authors who were in disfavour, and the "ideological harmfulness" of Tvardovsky's recently published poem, Tyorkin in the Other World. On this occasion, Surkov was acting on instruction from the Central Committee. Tvardovsky was forced to resign the editorship.

== The Campaign Against Pasternak ==
Surkov's hostility to Pasternak is reputed to have been aggravated by an incident in 1946, when Surkov was giving a poetry recital and was interrupted by thunderous applause when Pasternak, who was late, tried to slip into the hall unnoticed. In March 1947, writing in the magazine Culture and Life, he attacked Pasternak's poetry as "the pose of a recluse living outside time ... (who) speaks with obvious hostility and hatred towards the Soviet Revolution..."

In October 1957, after Pasternak had passed a manuscript of his novel Doctor Zhivago to the Italian communist and publisher Giangiacomo Feltrinelli, knowing that it would be banned in the USSR, Surkov travelled to Italy to try to persuade Feltrinelli not to publish it. When that failed, Surkov held a press conference, on 19 October, claiming that Pasternak had agreed to revise the work after it had been read and criticised by other Soviet writers. He compared this affair to the publication abroad in 1929 of the banned novel Mahogany, whose author, Boris Pilnyak, was subjected to public vilification, which was interpreted as a threat that the same was in store for Pasternak. The only effect of this press conference was to stimulate worldwide interest in the novel, whose first print, of 6,000, sold out in a single day.

In November, Surkov addressed a large meeting of writers and artists, warning them against "attempts to canonise" Pasternak, and attacked recent revived interest in artists who had suffered censorship or worse during the 1930s - Vsevolod Meyerhold, Mikhail Bulgakov, Pilnyak, Isaac Babel and Marina Tsvetaeva.

When Pasternak was nominated for the Nobel Prize in Literature in October 1958, Surkov was summoned to the Kremlin to brief the head of the communist party, Nikita Khrushchev:

Surkov said that Pasternak was a scoundrel and God knows what else and that his poems were terribly anti-Soviet and his influence on Russian literature baleful. On the basis of this report the vicious Soviet campaign against Pasternak was launched, and of course it incensed world opinion. When the whole scandal erupted, Khrushchev summoned Surkov, grabbed him by the collar, shook him fiercely, and gave him a terrible dressing-down for failing to mention that Pasternak was a world-famous author.

At the Soviet Writers' Congress in May 1959, he attacked Pasternak for his "treachery", but the speech was not generally well received, and he lost his position as head of the Writers' Union

== Personality ==
The BBC correspondent, Alexander Werth, who knew Surkov during the war, wrote that he had "two sides to him - that of the hard bureaucrat, and that of the man not free of all sensibility." Pasternak's widow, Olga Ivinskaya recalled Surkov's "heavy irony, the leering expression on his face, his whole manner so full of hatefulness and spite that people were quite sickened." But the writer Konstantin Simonov was grateful for Surkov's support during the anti-Semitic campaign of Stalin's last months, which culminated in the Doctors' plot, when someone highly placed falsely claimed that Simonov was, secretly, a Jew, named Simanovich. He wrote that "Surkov deeply, organically despised and hated both anti-Semitism as a phenomenon and anti-Semites."

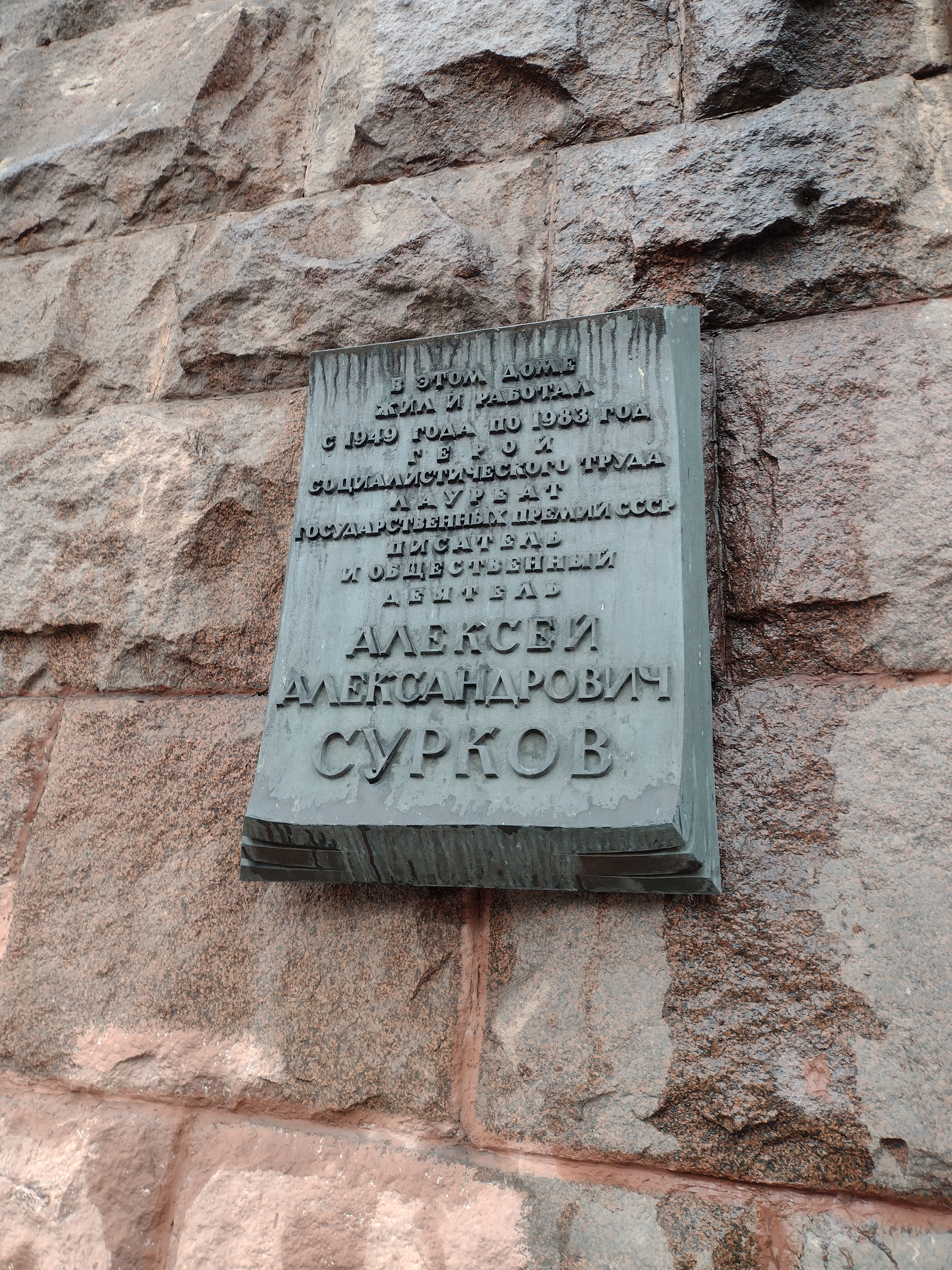
Historical plaque on his home in Moscow

In 1937, at the height of the Great Purge, Osip Mandelstam, who was penniless, banned from living in Moscow, and would soon be arrested, had a conversation with Surkov in a corridor at headquarters of the Writers' Union, and when he came out, discovered that Surkov had secretly put a gift of 300 roubles in his pocket. "In any final estimate of Surkov, one should not forget this gift of money," Mandelstam's widow wrote. "It was rather like the onion which, in Russian tradition, the sinner must hang on to if he wants the Virgin to pull him into heaven at the last moment."
