= Soviet Screen =

Soviet film magazine

- Vladimir Vysotsky is cover of No. 3, 1988
- Frequency: Biweekly
- Publisher: Izdatelstvo Pravda
- Founded: 1925
- Final issue: 1998
- Based in: Moscow
- Language: Russian
- ISSN: 0132-0742

Soviet Screen (Russian: Советский Экран, romanized: Sovetsky Ekran) was an illustrated magazine published in the USSR with varying frequency from 1925 to 1998 (with a break from 1941–1957).

The magazine covered domestic and foreign news silver screen, the history of cinema, published critical articles, published creative portraits of actors and film art figures. Annually, there are also readers polls, the results of which were called Best Film of the Year, Best Actor of the Year, Best Actress of the Year, Best Film for Children of the Year and Best Music Film of the Year.

In January–March 1925 the magazine was published under the title Screen Film Gazeta, in 1929–1930 — Cinema and Life, in 1931–1939 — Proletarian Cinema, in 1991-1997 — Screen. Prior to 1992, the journal was the organ of the Union of Cinematographers of the USSR State Committee for Cinematography and the USSR. The journal published articles on domestic and foreign movie screen updates, articles on cinema history, criticism, creative portraits of actors and cinematography workers.

In 1984, the print run was 1.9 million copies. In 1991, the then editor was the film critic Victor Dyomin the magazine was renamed to Screen. Soon the magazine began to appear less frequently — monthly. Under the title Screen Magazine lasted until 1997. In 1997-1998, the magazine for several months (even when another chief editor Boris Pinsky) again came out under his old name — Soviet Screen. Unable to withstand the default of 1998, the magazine ceased to exist.

In the 21st century, in an attempt to revive the magazine, Boris Pinsky, who worked in the magazine Soviet Screen since 1981 to 1991 and in "Screen" (1992-1998), restarted the title Soviet Screen and released several of its pilot numbers, but was unable to re-establish regular production.
