= State Jazz Orchestra of the USSR =

Soviet-era Jazz Band

The USSR State Jazz Band (or the State Jazz Orchestra of the USSR, Russian: Государственный джаз-оркестр СССР) was a Soviet jazz band that existed in 1930s–1940s.

After it was auditioned by Joseph Stalin in 1938, a number of similar state-sponsored musical ensembles were created across the country.

== Critical analysis ==
S. Frederick Starr comments in his book on the Soviet jazz that the band "played with a polish and precision any Western pop orchestra might have envied". But then he adds:

For all its precision, the State Jazz Orchestra was a dismal failure. Tsfasman's Americanism and his unpopularity with the bureaucrats had disqualified him for the position of conductor, which went instead to Victor Knushevitsky, a capable musician with absolutely no feeling for jazz. Miffed, Tsfasman then declined the post of second pianist that was offered him, leaving no true jazz player except [drummer Ivan] Bacheev in a position of importance in the State Jazz Orchestra. Knushevitsky's classical background and ignorance of jazz predisposed him to turn the band into a kind of chamber orchestra with saxophones. The results were disastrous. What began as a small group rapidly snowballed into a forty-three piece ensemble, quite enough to stifle any jazz feeling or spontaneity that individual musicians might have spirited into the group.

— S. Frederick Starr. Red and Hot: The Fate of Jazz in the Soviet Union 1917–1991

Boris Schwarz's book Music and Musical Life in Soviet Russia, 1917–1970 describes The State Jazz Orchestra of the USSR as "essentially" a "„light“ music" (easy listening) orchestra.

== Selected discography ==
- "Katyusha" (1939)
