= March of the Defenders of Moscow =

Russian military march

The "March of the Defenders of Moscow" (Russian: Марш защитников Москвы) or the "Song of the Defenders of Moscow" («Песня защитников Москвы») is a Soviet Russian military march originally used by the Red Army that first appeared during the 1941 Battle of Moscow. The lyrics to the march were written by Alexey Surkov, and the accompanying music was composed by Boris Mokrousov. In early October 1941, the Wehrmacht began their offensive to take control of Moscow. In shock, Surkov composed a poem he titled Defenders of Moscow. The poems were first published in the newspaper of the Krasnoarmeiskaya Pravda on 3 November 1941. A week later, it was printed by Vechernyaya Moskva. Drawing the attention of the Central Studio of Documentary Film of USSR, the text was set to music by Mokrousov and was broadcast in a documentary on the defense of the cities of Volokolamsk and Mozhaysk. It was later performed in an orchestra setting in the 1942 Soviet film, Moscow Strikes Back. It was also used in the 1944 film Six P.M..

Today, the song is part of the traditional repertoire of many Russian military bands. It's frequently performed during the annual Victory Day Parade (performed as recently as 2005 and 2010) of the Moscow Garrison. The march's melody is used as the hymn of the Turkish Communist Party.

== Lyrics ==
The march is composed of four verses and a chorus.

Original

В атаку стальными рядами
Мы поступью твердой идем.
Родная столица (Note: Also «Россия» (Rossija) 'Russia'.) за нами,
Рубеж наш назначен Вождём!

Припев:
Мы не дрогнем в бою за столицу свою,
Нам родная Москва дорога.
𝄆 Нерушимой стеной, обороной стальной
Разгромим, уничтожим врага! 𝄇

На марше равняются взводы
Гудит под ногами земля,
За нами – родные заводы
И красные звезды Кремля.

Припев

Для счастья своими руками
Мы строили город родной.
За каждый расколотый камень
Отплатим мы страшной ценой.

Припев

Не смять богатырскую силу,
Могуч наш заслон огневой.
Загоним фашистов в могилу (Note: Also «Нас Партия в битвах взрастила» (Nas Partija v bitvah vzrastila) 'The Party nurtured us in battles'.)
В туманных полях под Москвой. (Note: Also «Врага разобьём под Москвой» (Vraga razobiom pod Moskvoj) 'We'll finish off the enemy towards Moscow'.)

Припев

Romanization (Croatian-styled)

V ataku staljnymi rjadami
My postupiu tvjordoj idjom.
Rodnaja stolica za nami,
Rubež naš naznačen Voždjom!

Pripev:
My ne drognem v boju za stolicu svoju,
Nam rodnaja Moskva doroga.
𝄆 Nerušimoj stenoj, oboronoj staljnoj
Razgromim, uničtožim vraga! 𝄇

Na marše ravnjajutsja vzvody
Gudit pod nogami zemlja,
Za nami – rodnyje zavody
I krasnyje zvjozdy Kremlja.

Pripev

Dlja sčastia svoimi rukami
My stroili gorod rodnoj.
Za každyj raskolotyj kamenj
Otplatim my strašnoj cenoj.

Pripev

Ne smjatj bogatyrskuju silu,
Moguč naš zaslon ognevoj.
I vrag naš otyščet mogilu
V tumannyh poljah pod Moskvoj.

Pripev

Translation

Attacking in ranks of steel
We go forth with firm steps.
Our motherland's capital is behind us,
Our frontline has been drawn by our leader!

Chorus:
We shall not falter in the battle for our capital,
Our native Moscow is dear to us.
𝄆 As an unbreakable wall, a defence of steel
We shall defeat and crush the enemy! 𝄇

On the march, our platoons align themselves
The earth buzzes under our feet,
Behind us are our motherland's factories
And the red stars of the Kremlin.

Chorus

For fortunes, with our own hands
We built our native city.
For every stone they broke
We will make them pay a terrible price.

Chorus

Don't think of heroic strength,
Our might is our fiery resistance.
We will drive the fascists into their grave
In the foggy battlefields of Moscow.

Chorus

== See also ==
- List of socialist songs
- List of songs about Moscow
