= Ivan Golubets =

Soviet sailor (1916–1942)

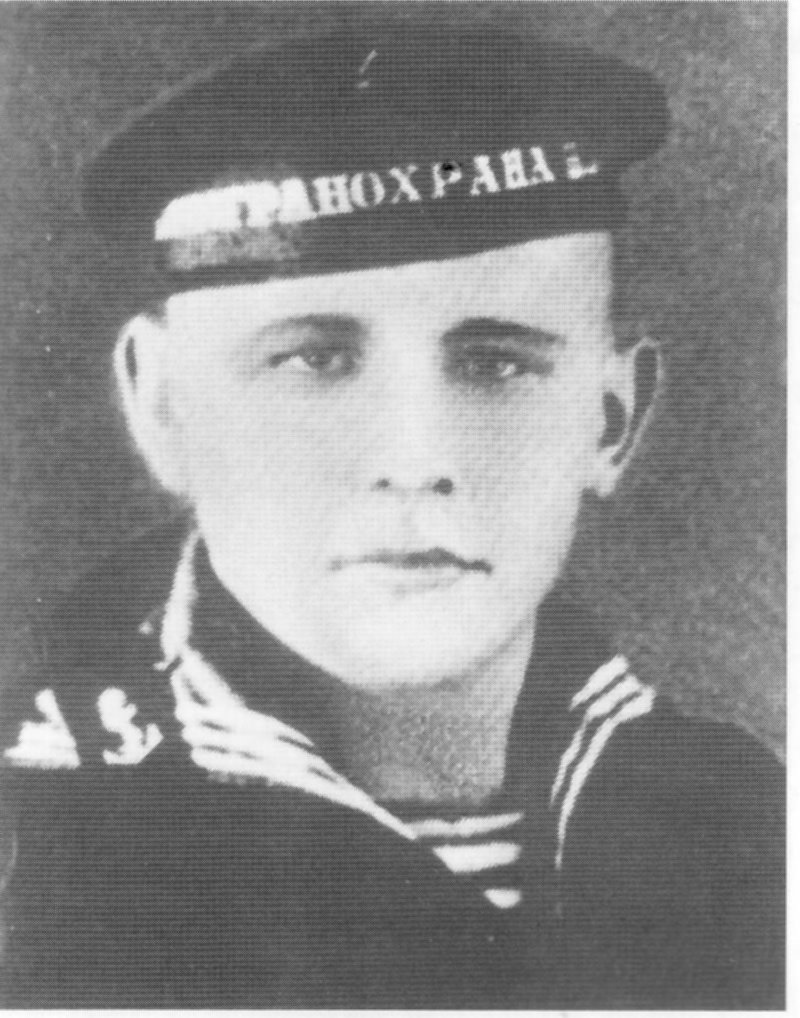
- Born: 8 May 1916; Taganrog, Russian Empire
- Died: 25 March 1942 (aged 25); Sevastopol, Soviet Union
- Military career
- Allegiance: Soviet Union
- Branch: Soviet Navy
- Service years: 1939–1942
- Rank: Старший матрос (senior sailor)
- Unit: Patrol boat СК-0183
- Conflicts: Battle for Sevastopol
- Awards: Hero of the Soviet Union

Ivan Karpovich Golubets (Russian: Ива́н Ка́рпович Голубе́ц; 8 May 1916 – 25 March 1942) was a Soviet sailor with the Black Sea Fleet. He was posthumously made a Hero of the Soviet Union.

== Biography ==
Ivan Golubets was born in the city of Taganrog on 8 May 1916 into the family of a Ukrainian worker. He worked at the iron and steel factory after 7 years in Taganrog's high school No. 2.

In 1937, Golubets enrolled into the Soviet Navy. In 1939, he graduated from the Coast-guard school in Balaklava, and served at the 2nd and in the 1st divisions of the Black Sea Fleet's coast-guard ships in the city of Novorossiysk. He participated in World War II beginning in June 1941, serving as steersman on the corvette (сторожевой корабль) SK-0183 (3rd division of guard-ships), making the brave feat in the spring of 1942 in Sevastopol.

On 25 March 1942 German artillery fired at the Streletskaya Bay, the engine department of another guard ship, SK-0121, was hit and burst into flames. Golubets took necessary measures for extinguishing the fire. After the second shell hit the Soviet ship, there was an explosion of the fuel tanks, which could lead to the explosion of anti-submarine bombs on board, threatening a chain explosion on other ships in the Bay. Golubets understood the situation and started rolling the anti-submarine depth bombs off the ship, until the last bomb exploded, but many other ships and people's lives were saved.

On 14 June 1942, Presidium of the Supreme Soviet issued a decree posthumously naming Golubets a Hero of the Soviet Union.

== Places and ships named after Golubets ==
- in 1948 one of the streets in Taganrog was named after Golubets;
- one of the streets in Anapa was named after Golubets;
- in Taganrog, a monument in memory of Golubets was placed in front of Chekhov Gymnasium, where he studied;
- a Ukrainian trawler was named after Golubets;
- in 2005, a minesweeper of the Russian Black Sea Fleet was named after Golubets;
- a Feodosiya-based motor ship was also named after Golubets.

== Sources ==
- Шмульян Г.Т. Голубец Иван Карпович // Энциклопедия Таганрога. — Таганрог: Антон, 1998. — С. 232. — ISBN 5-88040-017-4.
- И дольше века льётся сталь / Под ред. Н. И. Фартушного. — Ростов-на-Дону: Принт-Сервис, 2006. — 288 с.
- Два века Таганрогской гимназии. — Таганрог: БАННЭРплюс, 2007. — 288 с. — ISBN 978-5-98472-011-3.
