= Lev Philippovitch Wolkenstein =

- Лев Филиппович Волкенштейн
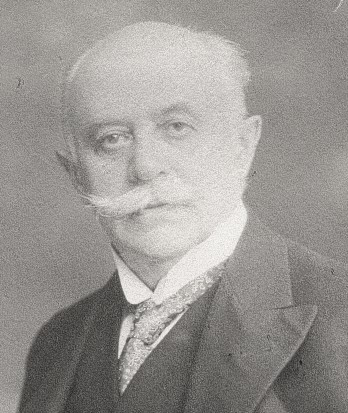
- Born: Исаак-Лейб Фишелевич Волкенштейн; 1858; Taganrog
- Died: May 20, 1935 (aged 76–77); Paris
- Citizenship: Russian Empire
- Education: Saint Petersburg State University
- Occupation: lawyer
- Spouse: Sofia Efremovna Wolkenstein
- Children: Alisa, Olga, Yuri/Georg

Lev Philippovitch Wolkenstein (Russian: Лев Фили́ппович Волкенште́йн, 1858—20.05.1935, Paris) was a Russian jurist, lawyer and cadet.

== Life ==
He was born as Isaak-Leib Fishelevich Wolkenstein (Russian: Исаак-Лейб Фишелевич Волкенштейн) in 1858, presumably in Taganrog. Wolkenstein was brother of Michael Philippovitch Wolkenstein, who was a Russian lawyer. Lev Wolkenstein studied at Taganrog Classical Male Gymnasium (Russian: Таганрогская классическая мужская гимназия) at the same time as Anton Chekhov. When Chekhov was in seventh grade and Wolkenstein was in undergraduate eighth grade, all of the students in Wolkenstein's class except him refused to write an essay prescribed for them. This caused conflict between Wolkenstein and his classmates. One of them called Wolkenstein a "zhyd", and Wolkenstein slapped him in the face. For this assault and battery, Wolkenstein was expelled from the gymnasium. After that, Chekhov induced classmates to write a collective statement that all of them would leave the gymnasium if Wolkenstein was not reinstated. That had an effect, and Wolkenstein was reinstated and later graduated from the gymnasium.

Then Wolkenstein studied at the faculty of law of Saint Petersburg State University. In 1888 he was a lawyer's assistant (Russian: помощник присяжного поверенного) and took part in a trial on a case of poisoning. Maximenko (Максименко) had been accused of poisoning her husband, but she was acquitted. A famous Russian lawyer Fedor Plevako and prison doctor Mark Krasso (Марк Крассо) also took part in that trial.

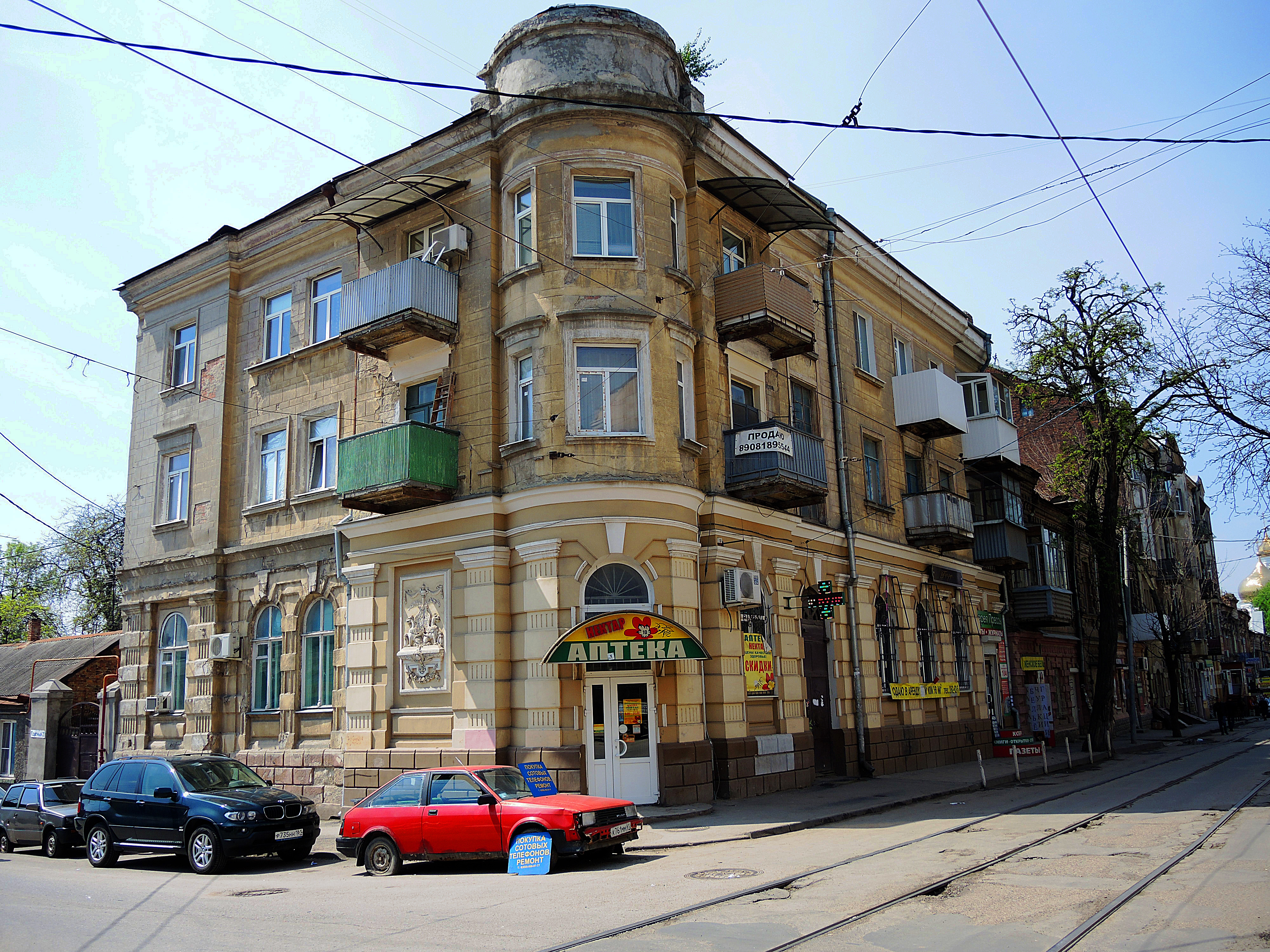
Revenue house of Lev Wolkenstein (2015)

In the 1890s, Wolkenstein became a lawyer of the Novocherkassk court board (Russian: Новочеркасская судебная палата) and juror lawyer. In 1890 he bought a house in Rostov-on-Don at the corner of Staro-pochtovaya street (now Stanislavskogo street) and Kazansky lane (now Gazetny lane), and made extensive repairs to it. From the mid 1890s Wolkenstein lived in this house with his wife Sofia Efremovna Wolkenstein (Russian: Софья Ефремовна Волкенштейн) (?—1940), his daughters (Alisa and Olga) and his young son Yuri/Georg Wolkenstein (1892—?), who later became a lawyer in Paris.

Chekhov visited Wolkenstein at his home, and may have talked with him about the staging of Chekhov's plays in the theatres of Rostov-on-Don. According to Chekhov, at 1896 Wolkenstein also had a dacha in Kislovodsk.

Wolkenstein was able to lease some of the rooms in his Rostov-on-Don house, which became a revenue house. The Revenue house of Wolkenstein building still exists today, and is considered a regional architectural monument.

Wolkenstein and Chekhov were both active in the theatrical world. The Asmolov Theatre founded by Vladimir Ivanovich Asmolov was the biggest and most famous theatre in Rostov-on-Don at that time. In 1910 Asmolov sold this theatre to Lev Wolkenstein and Iosif Moiseevich Fain (Russian: Иосиф Моисеевич Файн). Wolkenstein had been writing scripts for several theatrical performances, for example, the vaudeville Hussars and Doves (Russian: Гусары и голуби). At this time he was also working as a lawyer for the Priazovsky Kray newspaper.

Later Wolkenstein emigrated from Russia. He spent the last years of his life in Paris and wrote for Illustrated Russia (Russian: Иллюстрированная Россия) magazine. In 1934, he published his own memories of Anton Chekhov in the magazine.

On 20 May 1935, Lev Wolkenstein died in Paris. His widow Sofia Efremovna Wolkenstein lived several years more, and then on 4 January 1940 she died in Vulaines and was buried at Nouveau Cimetiere de Neuilly. Lev's son, George Wolkenstein, was the founder of the French branch of the family: Alexis Wolkenstein, his son; Pierre Wolkenstein and Marie-Sophie Wolkenstein, his grand children; and Paul, Louis, Héloïse and Simon Wolkenstein, his great grand children living in Paris.

== Gallery ==
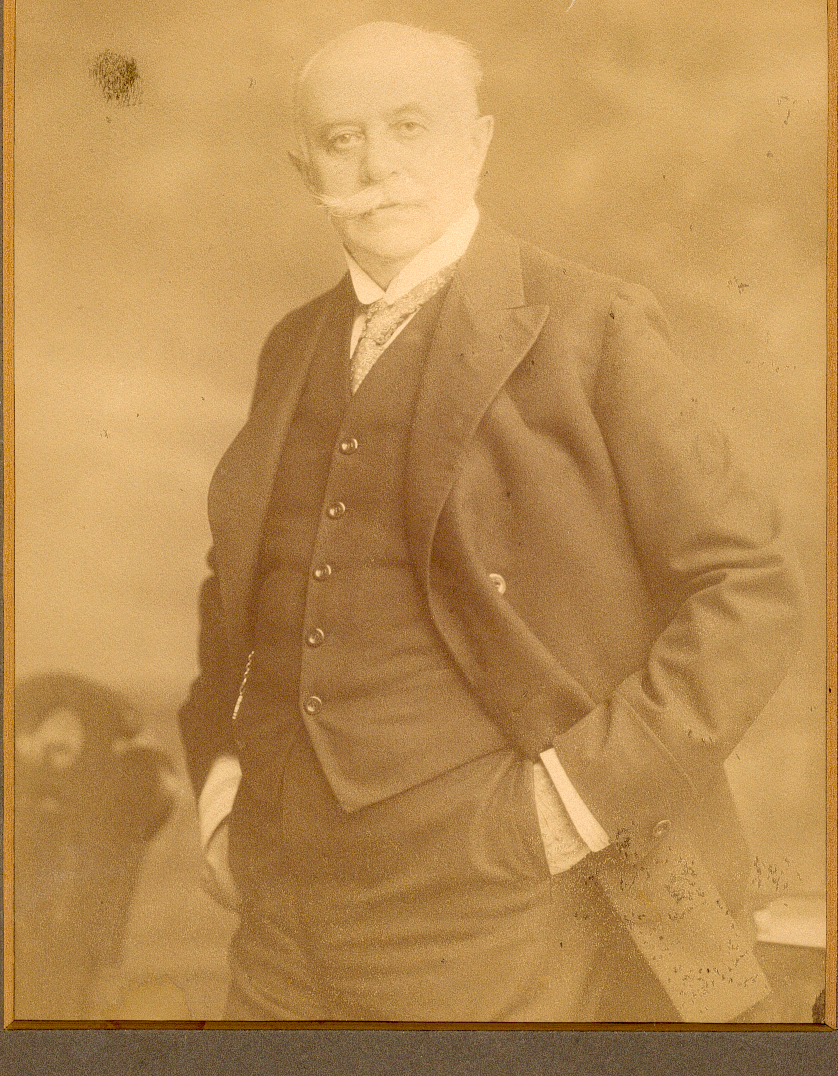
Lev Philippovitch Wolkenstein

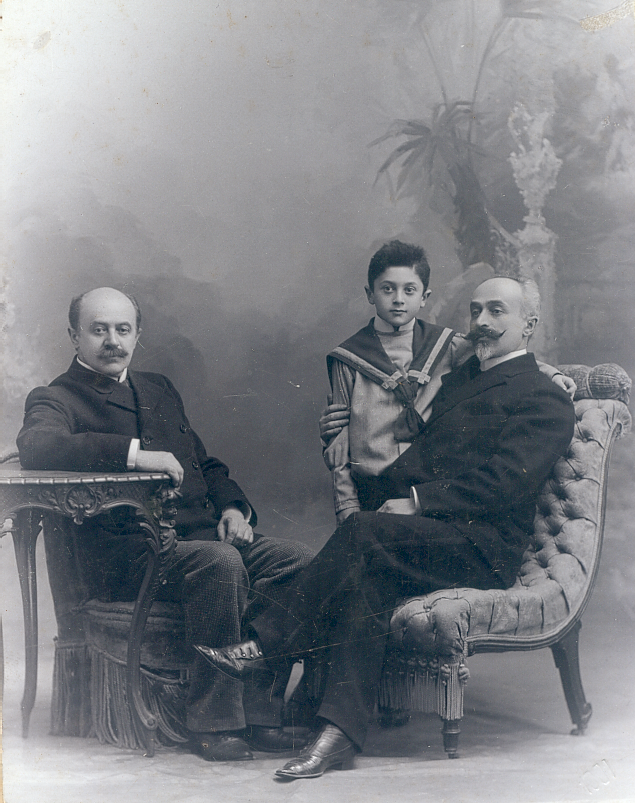
On the left: Lev Wolkenstein, on the right: Mikhail Wolkenstein and his nephew Yuri (Georg), the son of his brother Lev.

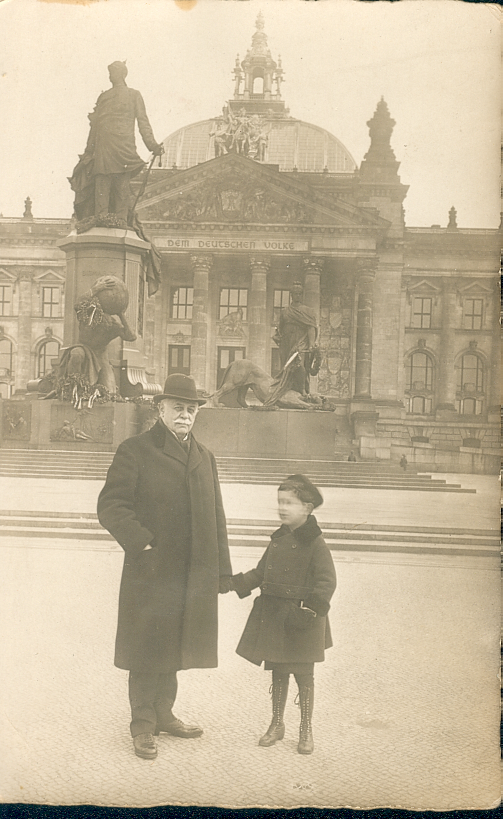
Lev Wolkenstein with son in Berlin

== Bibliography ==
- Варламова, Ирина (2010-01-28). "Вера, Чехов, любовь". Российская газета (in Russian) (5096).
- Волошинова, Вера (2010-01-22). "Чехов и Ростов-на-Дону" (PDF). Молот (in Russian) (7–8). Ростов-на-Дону. Archived from the original (PDF) on 2017-04-10.
- Волошинова, Вера (2012-06-08). "Ростов-на-Дону: дом Льва Волкенштейна". Молот (in Russian) (77–78). Ростов-на-Дону: 6.
- Волошинова, В. Ф.; Волошинова, Л. Ф. (2009). "Гимназический друг и театрал". Ант. Чехов и Ростов-на-Дону : литературно-краеведческое исследование ростовского круга А. П. Чехова (in Russian). Ростов-на-Дону: Странник. ISBN 978-5-902477-66-2.
- Габибова, О. В. (2015-10-15). "Чеховский Ростов". Копилка уроков (сайт) (in Russian).
- В. Н. Чуваков, ed. (1999). Незабытые могилы : российское зарубежье : некрологи 1917-1997 : в 6 т. (in Russian). Vol. 1: А-В. Москва: Пашков дом. p. 604. ISBN 5-7510-0169-9.
