= Vladimir Zakharov (composer) =

Soviet composer (1901–1956)

Vladimir Grigoryevich Zakharov (Russian: Владимир Григорьевич Захаров; October 18, 1901 – July 13, 1956), was a Soviet and Russian composer and choir conductor. He was born near Donetsk in the present-day Ukraine. From 1912 to 1921 he lived in the city of Taganrog, where he studied at the Boys Gymnasium and attended music classes by Valerian Molla at the Taganrog School for Music. He graduated from the Rostov Conservatory in 1927. His long-term connection with the Pyatnitsky Choir (since 1932) gave him many chances composing choral music. Most of his songs are in peasant way. Even sometime later, no one can tell whether one of his famous song was a composition or an arrangement of a folk piece.

In the 1920s, he and other composers formed the Russian Association of Proletarian Musicians (RAPM) and became an active member of this association.

Vladimir Zakharov was awarded the title of the People's Artist of the USSR in 1944, and received three Stalin Prizes in 1942, 1946 and 1952. He joined the Communist Party in 1944.

In 1948 he was appointed one of the Principal Secretaries of Union of Soviet Composers. He was an active figure in the persecution on "formalist" composers. Those who were denounced by him include Dmitri Shostakovich, Sergei Prokofiev, Aram Khachaturian, Nikolai Myaskovsky, and Vano Muradeli.
