= Matvey Blanter =

Soviet Russian composer (1903–1990)

Matvey Blanter Матвей Блантер
- Born: Matvey Isaakovich Blanter; 10 February 1903; Pochep, Chernigov Governorate, Russian Empire
- Died: 27 September 1990 (aged 87) Moscow, Russian SFSR, Soviet Union
- Occupation: Composer
- Years active: 1920–1990

Matvey Isaakovich Blanter (Russian: Матвей Исаакович Блантер; 10 February [O.S. 28 January] 1903 – 27 September 1990) was a Soviet composer, and one of the most prominent composers of popular songs and film music in the Soviet Union. Among many other works, he wrote the famous "Katyusha" (1938), performed to this day internationally. He was active as a composer until 1975, producing more than two thousand songs.

== Childhood and education ==
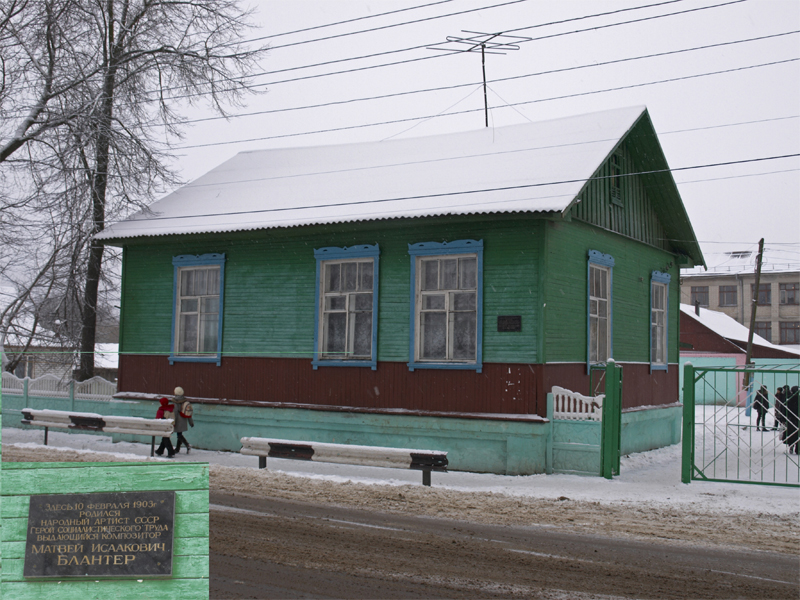
Birthplace of Matvey Blanter

Blanter, the son of a Jewish craftsman, was born in the town of Pochep, then in the Chernigov Governorate of the Russian Empire. He studied piano and violin at the Kursk Higher Music School. From 1917 to 1919, he continued his education in Moscow, studying violin and composition.

== Career ==
Blanter's first songs were composed in the 1920s. At the time, he wrote light dance and jazz music, including "John Gray" (1923), a foxtrot that became a major hit. In the 1930s, as Soviet culture grew more ideologically strict, Blanter shifted toward writing Soviet propaganda songs. He emerged as one of the creators of the Soviet "mass song".

Some of Blanter's 1930s songs were styled after the Red Army songs of the Russian Civil War (1918–1921) and mythologized the war's Bolshevik heroes. The most famous among these are "The Song of Shchors" (1935), telling the tale of Ukrainian Red Army commander Nikolai Shchors, and "Partisan Zheleznyak" (1936), which combines the energetic rhythms of a military marching song with elements of a mournful ballad as it describes Commander Zheleznyak's heroic death in battle (the song opens and closes with a stanza about Zheleznyak's lonely burial mound in the steppes).

Other notable Blanter songs from that period include "Youth" (1937), a cheerful marching song asserting that "right now, everyone is young in our young, beautiful country"; "Stalin Is Our Battle-Glory" (1937), a widely performed hymn to Joseph Stalin; and "The Football March" (1938), music from which is still performed at the start of every football match in Russia.

In 1938, Blanter began his long-lasting collaboration with the poet Mikhail Isakovsky. Their first song, undoubtedly the most famous of Blanter's works, was the world-renowned "Katyusha". In it, Blanter combined elements of the heroic, upbeat battle song and of a peasant song representing a woman's lamentation for an absent lover. Standing on a high riverbank, a young woman, Katyusha, sings of her beloved (compared to "a gray eagle of the steppes"), who is far away serving on the Soviet border. The theme of the song is that the soldier will protect the Motherland and its people while his girl will preserve their love. While the song is joyful and filled with the imagery of a fertile, blooming land, it also conveys the sense that the motherland is under threat. "Katyusha" gained fame during World War II as an inspiration to defend one's land from the enemy.

In 1937, Pravda published a request for thousands of Soviet girls to go to work in the far east of the county, to help construct military defences. Blanter was commissioned to write the highly-popular operetta On the Bank of the Amur River to celebrate the initiative: the premiere took place at Moscow Operetta Theatre in 1939, and the work was broadcast by Moscow Radio as well as taken up by operatic companies throughout the country.

Blanter accompanied the Red Army to Berlin in early 1945. He was commissioned by Stalin to compose a symphony about the capture of Berlin. However, when Vasily Chuikov was meeting with a German delegation led by Hans Krebs to negotiate their surrender following Hitler's suicide, Chuikov had several uniformed war correspondents pretend to be members of his general staff in order to appear more professional and intimidating at the negotiations. But Blanter was also meeting with Chuikov at the time the delegation arrived and he could not pass as a Red Army officer as he was wearing civilian clothes. Thus, Chuikov shoved him into a closet just before the delegate entered the room. While he remained there for most of the conference, he eventually lapsed into unconsciousness from a lack of air, collapsing out of the closet and into the room just as the delegates were preparing to leave, embarrassing Chuikov and astonishing the Germans.

Blanter wrote several other highly popular wartime songs. His 1945 song, "The Enemy Burned Down His Home", about a soldier who returns from the front to find his entire family dead, became controversial when the authorities deemed it too pessimistic and banned its performance; it was performed for the first time in 1961.

Blanter's postwar songs include "The Migratory Birds Are Flying" (1949), a patriotic Soviet song in which the narrator watches migratory birds fly away and asserts that he can think of no better place to be than the Motherland, and "Dark-Eyed Cossack Girl" (Russian: Черноглазая казачка), written especially for the bass-baritone Leonid Kharitonov.

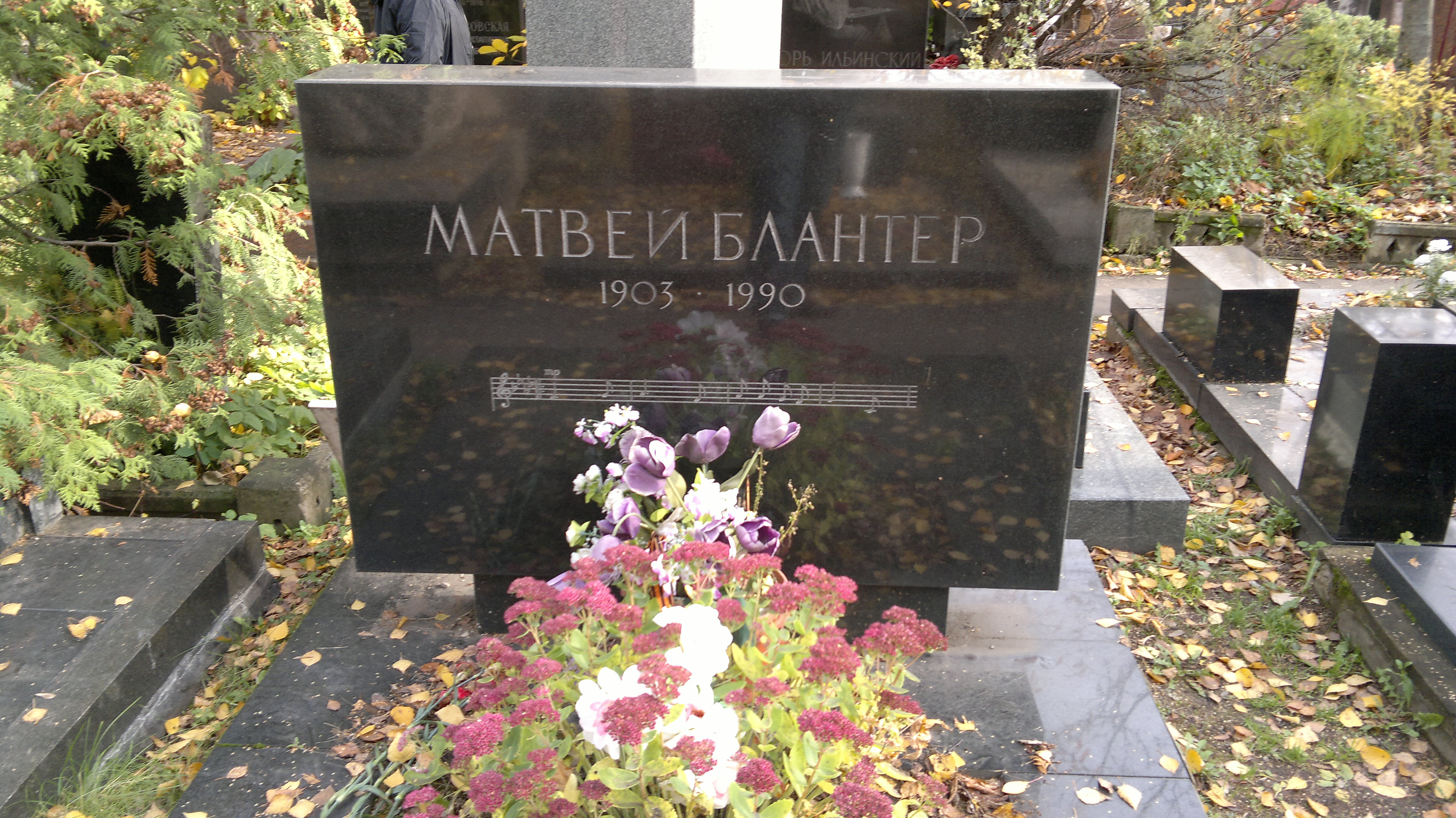
Blanter's grave at the Novodevichy Cemetery

In 1983, Blanter became a member of the Anti-Zionist Committee of the Soviet Public, an organization created by the Soviet Union as an anti-Zionist propaganda tool. He died in Moscow in 1990 and was buried at Novodevichy Cemetery, Moscow.

== Awards and honors ==
- Stalin Prize (1946) (for the songs "Under the Balkan Stars", "In a way, a path far", "My beloved", "In the forest, front-line")
- People's Artist of the RSFSR (1965)
- Order of the Badge of Honour (1967)
- People's Artist of the USSR (1975)
- Hero of Socialist Labour (1983)

== References in popular culture ==
Ayn Rand's 1936 novel We the Living, set in Petrograd between 1923 and 1925, has a passage devoted to the huge popularity of "John Gray."

In the 1966 novel The Last Battle, Cornelius Ryan records that Blanter accompanied the Red Army into Berlin during the last days of the war and the collapse of Nazi power.

In the 2004 film, Downfall, Blanter plays a small role and is portrayed by Boris Schwarzmann. In the film, he is stuffed into the closet of Vasily Chuikov's office, who is in a rush to meet the Nazi general, Hans Krebs.
