= Dmitry Girs =

Russian writer

Dmitry Konstantinovich Girs (Russian: Дми́трий Константи́нович Гирс; (1836, in Taganrog – 15 December [O.S. 3 December] 1886, in Saint Petersburg) was a Russian writer.

Girs was born in Taganrog, where his father was chief of quarantine. Girs's ancestors were of Swedish origin. His most notable relative was his cousin Nikolai Karlovich Girs, foreign minister from 1882–1894. In 1843, his family moved to Saint Petersburg, where he studied in a military school, graduated from the engineer college, and then served as a field engineer. In 1868 he had to leave the city as punishment for his speech at the funeral ceremony of Dmitri Pisarev.

Girs's first writings were published in 1862 in The Russian Messenger under the pen-name Konstantinov. In 1868 he published the beginning of his novel Staraia i novaia Rossia (The Old and New Russia) in Otechestvennye zapiski (Homeland Notes). Although the novel aroused great expectations, it was never finished. Other works by Girs are Na krayu propasti (On the edge of the abyss) in Delo (The deed), 1870; Kaliforniiskiy rudnik (The California mine) in Otechestvennye zapiski, 1872; Dnevnik notarialnogo pistsa (The diary of a notary scribe), Ibid., 1883; Avdotya-dvumuzhnitsa (Avdotya the bigamist) in Russkaya mysl' (Russian Thought), 1884.

In 1876 Girs worked in Serbia as a military reporter for Sankt-Peterburgskiye Vedomosti (The St. Petersburg Gazette) and in 1877 for Severnyi vestnik (The Northern Bulletin). In 1878-1880 Girs published his own newspaper, called Russkaya pravda (Russian Truth), in which he wrote feuilletons under the pen-name Dobro-Glagol. The paper was respected but never enjoyed great success; it incurred administrative penalties and was suspended from publishing many times.

Girs's works Zapiski voiennogo (Notes of a military man) and Kaliforniiskiy rudnik were published in a single volume (St. Petersburg, 1872).
