= Yury Okhochinsky =

- Born: Yury Vladimirovich Okhochinsky; April 20, 1958 (age 68); Boksitogorsk, Leningrad Oblast, RSFSR, Soviet Union
- Origin: Saint Petersburg, Russia
- Genres: Pop, Russian music,
- Occupation: Singer
- Instruments: vocals, piano
- Website: okhochinskiy.com

Yury Vladimirovich Okhochinsky (Russian: Юрий Владимирович Охочинский; born April 20, 1958, Boksitogorsk) is a Soviet and Russian singer, baritone. Builds on the repertoire of lyrical ballads and romantic songs.

== Biography ==
Yury Okhochinsky born April 20, 1958, in Boksitogorsk.

Graduate Russian State Institute of Performing Arts. After two years working in a rock theater ensemble Poyushchiye Gitary.

A singer's solo career began in 1983, the first success, We Have Not Separated, The leader of the St. Petersburg charts 1983–84. In 1985, according to a poll of the Leningrad press: Yuri Okhochinsky was the best young singer of the year. Winner of the song contest Pesnya Goda, the participant of numerous musical programs on the Soviet TV and radio. In 1993 he had his first recital in the Oktyabrskiy Big Concert Hall.

In 1994 Okhochinsky sung the opening and closing Goodwill Games in Petersburg.

By results of 1999 the singer Yuri Okhochinsky received the award in the field of culture People of Our City, as the best singer of the year in St. Petersburg.

He worked on the radio.
