= Alexandra Permyakova =

Russian artist

- Александра Андреевна Пермякова
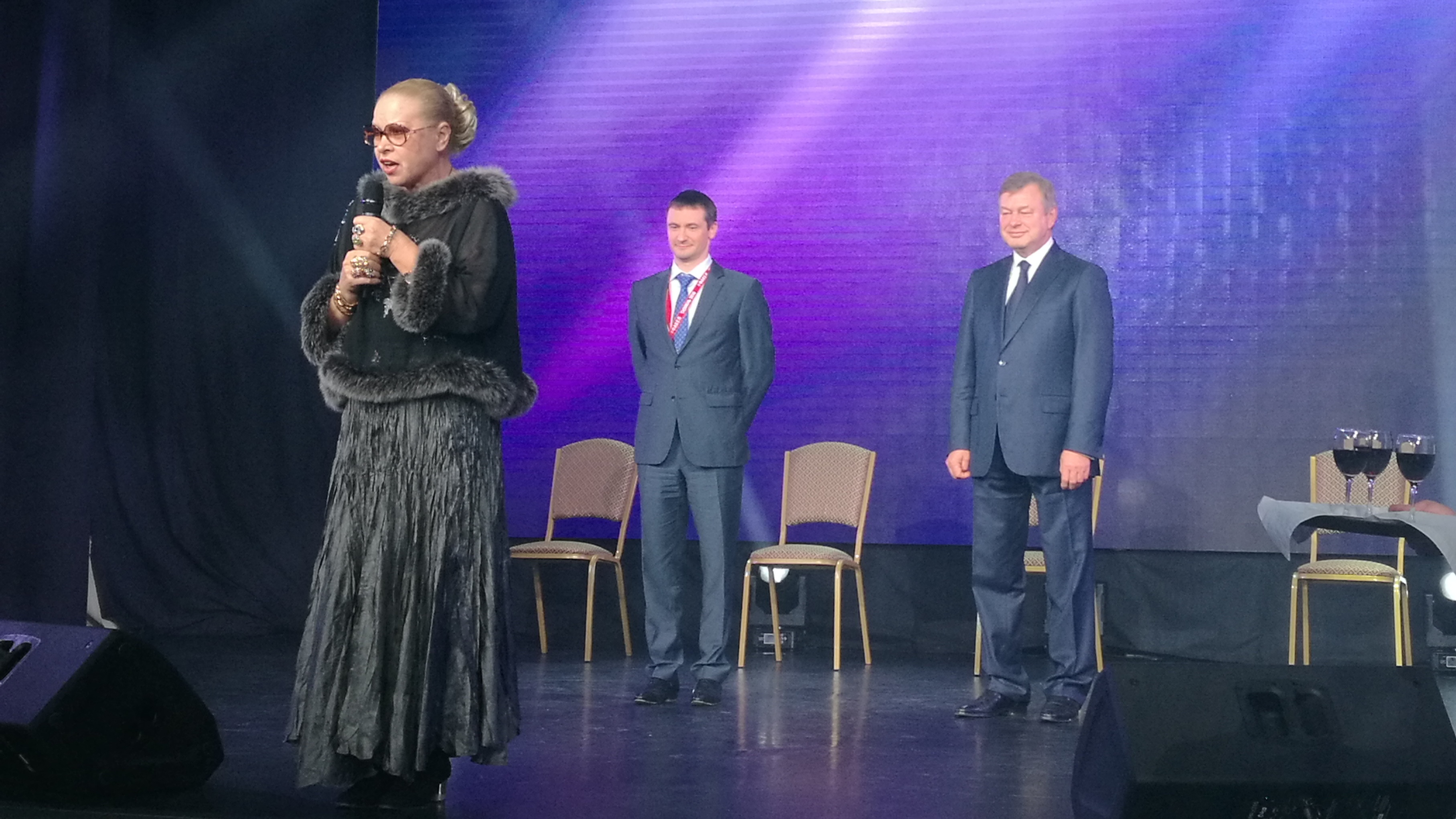
- Born: 17 October 1949 (age 76); Pervaya Piterka, Tambov Oblast, RSFSR
- Citizenship: Soviet, Russian
- Education: Russian Institute of Theatre Arts
- Occupation: Artist
- Known for: Artistic director of Pyatnitsky Choir
- Awards: State Prize of the Russian Federation, Order "For Merit to the Fatherland", Order of Honour, Medal "Veteran of Labour", People's Artist of Russia, Honored art worker of Russia Honored culture worker of Russia, Honored arts worker of Dagestan, Order of Holy Prince Daniel of Moscow, Order of Reverend Sergius of Radonezh

Alexandra Andreevna Permyakova (Russian: Александра Андреевна Пермякова; born 17 October 1949) is a Russian artist, since 1995 artistic director of the Pyatnitsky Choir.

== Biography ==
Alexandra Andreevna Permyakova was born on October 17, 1949, in the village of Pervaya Piterka, Tambov Oblast. She actively participated in amateur performances and at one of the song competitions, with her ringing voice (soprano), she attracted the attention of the soloist of the Pyatnitsky Choir. In this group in 1971, Alexandra Permyakova began her creative activity as an ordinary chorus girl, later becoming a soloist of the choir.

Subsequently, Permyakova graduated from the department of pop directors of the Russian Institute of Theatre Arts and in 1989 headed the Pyatnitsky Choir as director. From 1995 to this day she has been its artistic director.

In addition to her main activity, Permyakova is a stage director for various holidays, festivals, events and ceremonies. She carries out teaching activities: conducts master classes for managers, artists, creative groups and students of theater universities. She made a contribution to the development of cultural interaction and cooperation between the peoples of Russia, the CIS countries and far abroad.

In 2018, Alexandra Permyakova was Vladimir Putin’s confidant in the presidential election which was held in that year. On January 7, 2023, against the backdrop of Russia's invasion of Ukraine, it was added to Ukraine's sanctions list.

She was awarded the titles Honored Worker of Culture of Russia (1993), Merited Artist of the Russian Federation (1999), Honored Artist of the Republic of Mordovia, People's Artist of Russia (2007), Honored Artist of the Republic of Dagestan (2017). She is also Honorary professor of the Russian Institute of Theatre Arts. Knight of the Order "For Merit to the Fatherland", IV degree (2019) and laurent of the State Prize of the Russian Federation. From 2011 to 2018, he was a member of the Presidential Council for Culture and Art.
