= Novoye Vremya (newspaper) =

Defunct Russian newspaper (1868–1917)

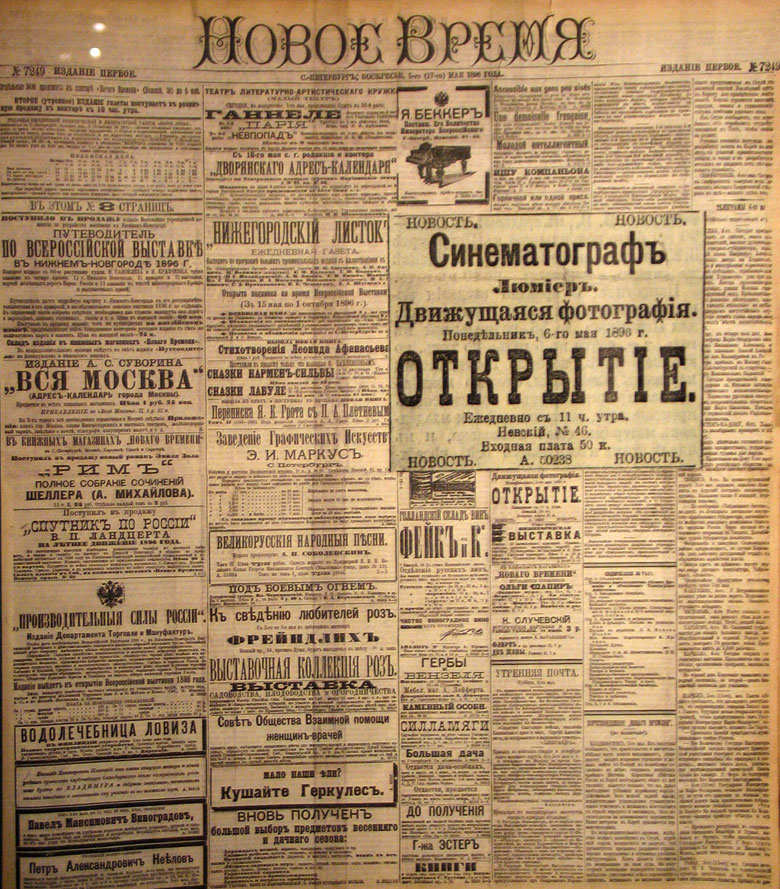
- Front page of a May 1896 issue
- Type: Daily newspaper
- Owner: Aleksey Suvorin
- Founded: 1868; 158 years ago
- Ceased publication: 1917
- Political alignment: Conservatism; Monarchism; Previously (1868-1876); Liberalism
- Language: Russian
- Headquarters: Saint Petersburg

Novoye Vremya (Russian: Новое время [ˈnovəjə ˈvrʲemʲə], lit. 'New Times') was a Russian newspaper published in St. Petersburg from 1868 to 1917. Until 1869, it was published five times a week. Then it was published every day until 1881, when there were both morning and evening editions. In 1891, a weekly illustrated supplement was added.

The newspaper began as a liberal publication and in 1872 published an editorial celebrating the appearance in Russian of the first volume of Karl Marx's Das Kapital, but after Aleksey Suvorin took it over, it acquired a reputation as a servile supporter of the government, in part because of the antisemitic and reactionary articles of Victor Burenin. "The motto of Suvorin's Novoye Vremya,' wrote influential Russian satirist Saltykov-Shchedrin, 'is to go inexorably forward, but through the anus." Nevertheless, it became one of Russia's most popular newspapers, with a circulation reaching 60,000 copies, and published important writers, most famously Anton Chekhov until he broke with Suvorin in the late 1890s; furthermore, Suvorin was "the first to raise the salaries in the newspaper world and to improve the working conditions of the journalists." It was also the first newspaper to mention The Protocols of the Elders of Zion, a notorious antisemitic hoax that claims that the Jews are conspiring to rule the world: journalist Mikhail Menshikov claimed in a column that he had read the booklet upon suggestion of "a venerable lady of the upper class" and mocked its authors and spreaders as "people with brain fever".

The paper was looked down on by the liberal intelligentsia of the early 20th century and despised by the Bolsheviks. The day after the October Revolution, 8 November [O.S. 26 October] 1917, Lenin shut it down.

The newspaper should not be confused with the current magazine of the same name, which was founded in 1943, or with the current Ukrainian newspaper of the same name.

== Publishers ==
- A. K. Krikor and N. N. Yumatov (1868–1872)
- F. N. Ustryalov (1872–1873)
- Osip Notovich (1873–1874)
- K. V. Trubnikov (1874–1876)
- Aleksey Suvorin (1876–1912)
- the A. S. Suvorin Company (1912–1917)
