= Boris Mokrousov =

Soviet composer (1909–1968)

- Born: Boris Andreyevich Mokrousov; 27 February 1909; Kanavino, Nizhny Novgorod, Russian Empire
- Died: 27 March 1968 (aged 59); Moscow, RSFSR, Soviet Union
- Occupation: Composer
- Notable work: March of the Defenders of Moscow; Lonely Accordion; The Elusive Avengers (1967)

Boris Andreyevich Mokrousov (Russian: Бори́с Андре́евич Мокроу́сов; 27 February 1909 – 27 March 1968) was a Soviet and Russian composer.

== Biography ==
He was born in Kanavino, Nizhny Novgorod.

He died in Moscow, and was buried in Novodevichy Cemetery.

== Filmography ==
- Bride with a Dowry (1953)
- Spring on Zarechnaya Street (1956)
- The Cook (1965)
- The Elusive Avengers (1967)

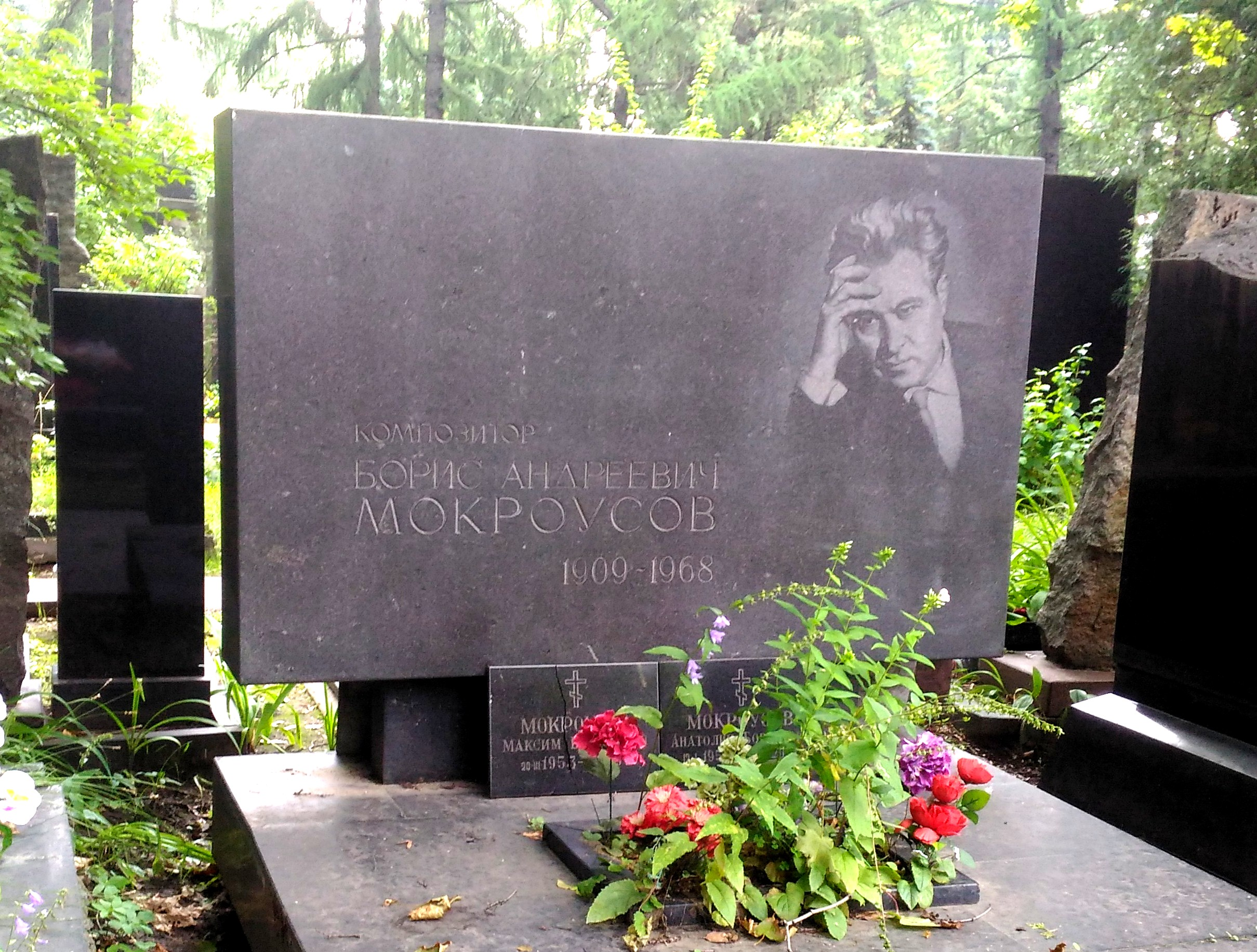

== Awards ==
- Medal "For Valiant Labour in the Great Patriotic War 1941–1945"
- Medal "In Commemoration of the 800th Anniversary of Moscow"
- Stalin Prize (1948)
