= Pyatnitsky Choir =

Russian musical group established in 1910

Pyatnitsky Russian Folk Chorus Государственный академический русский народный хор им. М. Е. Пятницкого
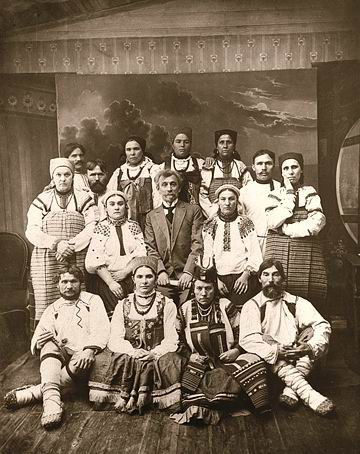

Background information
- Genre: folk tunes
- Years active: 1910 - present
- Members: Alexandra Permyakova
- Website: pyatnitsky.ru

The Pyatnitsky Russian Folk Chorus (Russian: Государственный академический русский народный хор им. М. Е. Пятницкого) is a Russian musical group which was established by Mitrofan Pyatnitsky in 1910 initially with 18 peasants from Voronezh, Ryazan and Smolensk gubernias. The peasant chorus held its first performance at the Small hall of the Moscow Nobility Club (later the October Hall of the House of the Unions) on March 2, 1911.

Pyatnitsky focused on traditional Russian song. The performers sang, enacted dance scenes and played folk instruments. One of the first renowned soloists in the chorus was Arina Kolobayeva. In its early years the chorus received high praise from Russian musicians Sergei Rachmaninov and Fyodor Chaliapin.

In 1918, the chorus transferred its base to Moscow. After hearing the chorus, Lenin personally noted the necessity of expanding the chorus's activities, having it perform in concert halls, factories and plants. In 1925, Mitrofan Pyatnitsky was awarded the title of Merited Artist of the Republic.

After Pyatnitsky's death, the company was named after him and its leadership was taken over by Pyotr Kazmin. In 1931, the chorus was joined by Vladimir Grigorievich Zakharov, who enhanced the chorus's repertoire with his songs. The ensemble was enlarged with a dance group and orchestra of Russian folk instruments in the 1930s, led by Vasily Khvatov. In 1962, Valentin Levashov became the company's art director.

The chorus maintains a folklore studio that houses an extensive collection of folklore materials and recordings. Today, the chorus boasts over 100 members and has received numerous state awards. Throughout its long history, it has performed in every part of the former Soviet Union and toured countries including Czechoslovakia, Poland, Bulgaria, Romania, Hungary, Austria, Finland, Canada, Palestine, Israel, Japan, Sweden, Mexico, Germany, the USA, Australia, New Zealand, South Africa, Norway, North Korea, and Luxembourg.

The group has often performed on stage with Alexander Rosenbaum.

== Sources ==
- Soviet Song and Dance Companies - Gosconcert, USSR, 1977.
